= Bussang Pass =

Pass in France's Vosges mountains

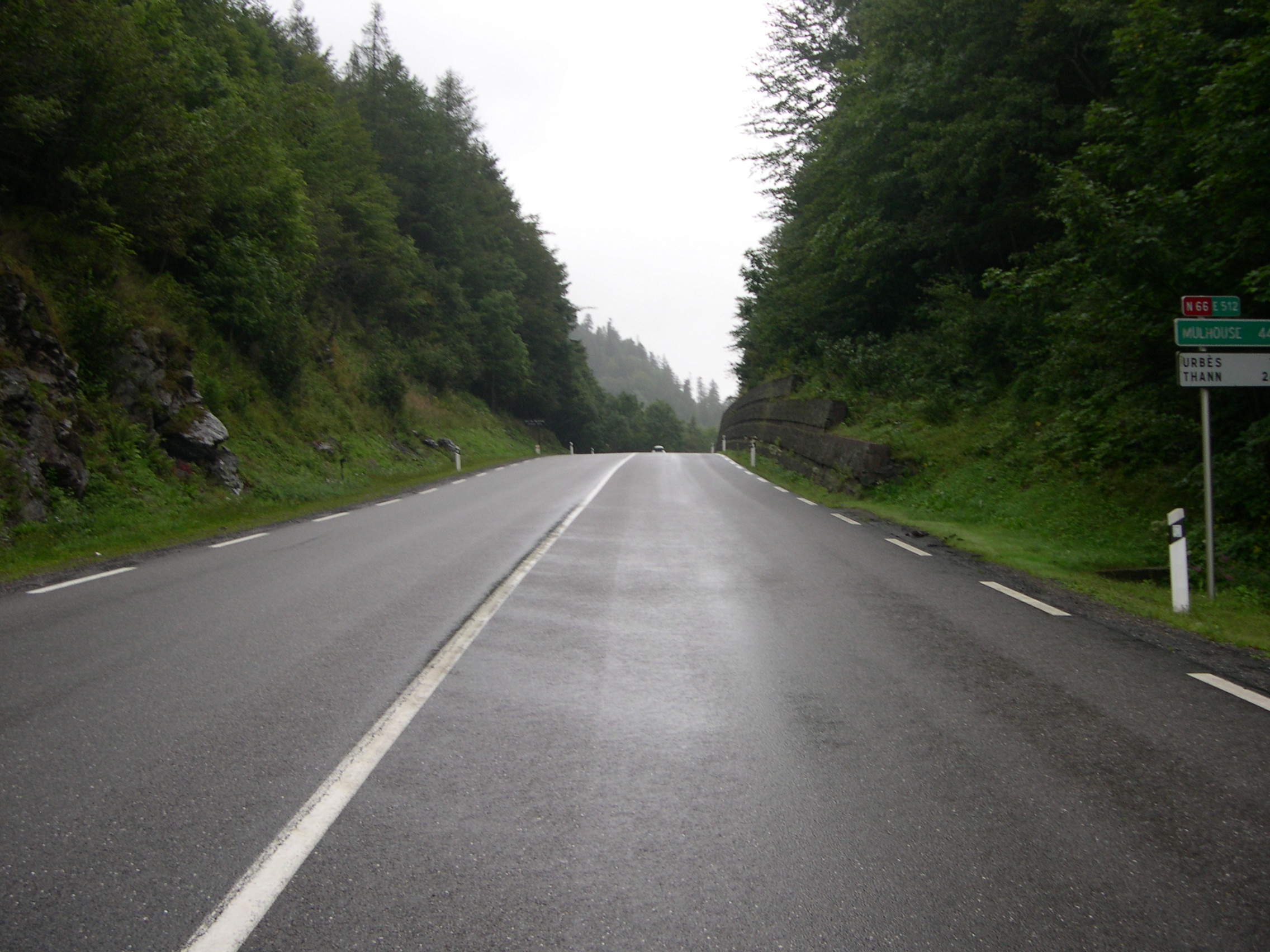
- View of the road crossing the pass.

- Location within France
- Elevation: 727 m (2,385 ft)

First Approach
- Length: 8 km (5.0 mi)
- Traversed by: Route nationale 66 (France)
- Avg gradient: 2.2 %
- Max gradient: 4.6 %
- Ascent from: Saint-Maurice-sur-Moselle

Second Approach
- Length: 6.5 km (4.0 mi)
- Traversed by: Route nationale 66 (France)
- Avg gradient: 4.2 %
- Max gradient: 6.8 %
- Ascent from: Urbès

Location
- Location: France
- Range: Vosges
- Coordinates: 47°53′22″N 6°53′51″E

The Col de Bussang (Bussang Pass) is one of the busiest passes in France's Vosges mountains. Located in the Grand Est region of France at an altitude of 727 m, it links Lorraine and Alsace via Route Nationale 66 (also European Route 512). The two communes on the Lorraine side of the pass are Bussang, and the Alsace side is Urbès. The ridge crossing at Bussang is one of the main historical passes that have crossed the Vosges since ancient times, alongside the Col du Bonhomme, the Col du Donon, and the Col de Saverne.

The importance of vehicular traffic over the Bussang pass has grown steadily since the last centuries of the Middle Ages, with the intensification of road and trade links between Flanders and Italy. The passage from the Vosges massif to the south is, therefore, part of a road network based on a so-called Lotharingian Europe, but by no means exclusive to the Flanders-Italy junction. To avoid climbing the passes of the southern Vosges, other trade routes took in the Alsatian plain or the Franche-Comté passes. The flourishing forestry and mining activities of the 15th to 17th centuries in the Upper Moselle Valley at the foot of the Ballon d'Alsace reinforced the local traffic around the Bussang pass, where raw material sites and processing factories were concentrated. The industrial and agropastoral activities of the Upper Moselle also encouraged the immigration of skilled workers from German-speaking countries on the Roman side of the pass, such as miners, marcaires from Switzerland, Alsace, and Germany, and coal miners from Sweden, the Tyrol and the Black Forest in the mountainous area between the Col du Bussang and the Col des Charbonniers.

Defourny's Trésor des Chartes de Lorraine does not speak in terms of cols but rather of “passages” or “pertuis” in the village of Vôge. (Note: Caution should be exercised when writing the word "Vosges" in the form "Vôge". Indeed, the Vôge is today a non-homogeneous cultural and geographical region whose territory does not correspond to the former bailiwick of Vosges, which was much larger. There were no typographical standards in the official writings of the Duchy of Lorraine: the current word "Vosges" is also found in the singular "Vosge". Thierry Alix, the intendant of the duchy in the 16th century, chose the plural spelling. For a contemporary reader, it is objectively easier to identify the word "Vosges" as a historical region by referring to the current department.) Situated at the crossroads of the Romanesque cultural sphere on the one hand and the Germanic world on the other, the Col de Bussang remains an ancestral frontier between various entities: sovereign states, temporal abbatial or canonical principalities, archdioceses, or linguistic areas. However, its vocation as a passageway has always outweighed its function as a natural frontier.

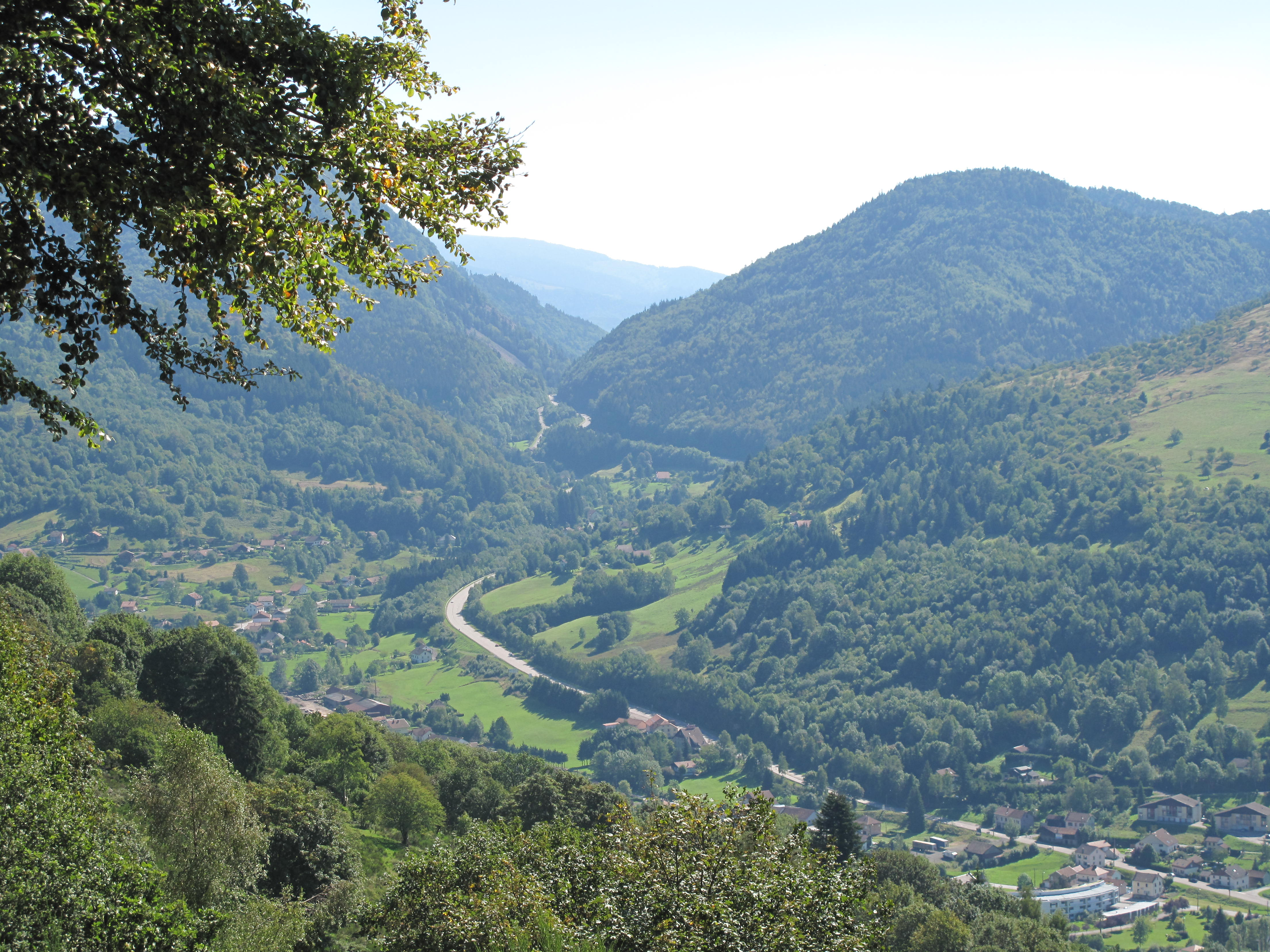
Bussang Pass, Lorraine side.

== Toponymy ==
The use of the term “Col de Bussang” is relatively recent. On either side of the Franco-German language boundary, we used to say or read:

- For the French-speaking part (including the Vosges dialect):
  - passage de Taye,
  - pertuis d'Estaye (Note: Létraye is an orthographic variant of the locality Lestraye, or Lettraye, located in the commune of Ramonchamp. The Roman road Bâle-Metz passed through this hamlet, where a toll station was established and later relinquished by Duke Ferry III of Lorraine in 1255 in favor of the canonesses of Remiremont. In Ferry III's act, the toll location near the pass was spelled "Estaie". See: Louis, Léon; Chevreux, Paul (1991). Département des Vosges [Vosges Department] (in French). Vol. 2. Paris: Res Universalis. p. 29. ISBN 2877606449.) (Perthus, Perthuix, Potieu),
  - col de l'Estaye,
  - pertuis de Taye or de la Taye,
  - côte du Taye;
- For the German-speaking part (including the Alsatian dialect):
  - Steige zur Linden (Steig zür Linde),
  - D'Steig, (Note: In Eduard Grucker, Die Vogesen, ed. Velhagen & Klasing, 1908, we read the following extract: “Over the deep cut of the Col de Bussang (720 m, formerly the path or pass to the Linden).”)
  - Pass zur Linden,
  - der Bussang-Sattel (or der Sattel).

The toponyms of the settlements below the pass on either side, Bussang or Urbès, appear visibly little or not at all in the first names of the pass. As is the case for other regions of the Vosges massif on the Alsatian side, the German-speaking part insists on the topographical characteristic: the term “Steige” designates a “hill” or “climb”. The same name is used for the Col de Saverne (German: Zaberner Steige), (Note: There are still two streets in the commune of Saverne that bear this name: “La Côte de Saverne” which is the extension of the D1006 from the town sign and “Rue de la côte” just before starting the climb of the pass – “Les rues de Saverne,” on google/maps (accessed May 31, 2014).) (Note: Segment No. 21 of the Atlas de Trudaine for the généralité de Metz, dated 1745 to 1780, is titled: "Map of the road from Metz to Strasbourg up to the bottom of Holderlock between Phaltzbourg and the slope of Saverne where the généralité of Metz ends." See: "Carte généralité de Metz accessible en ligne" [General map of Metz available online]. culture.gouv.fr (in French). 2014..) the Col de Steige at Offwiller between Moselle and Bas-Rhin. In fact, for German speakers, the name Steige has little to do with mountainous regions: in south and south-west German, it mainly refers to a steep road. (Note: The equivalent in central Germany is "Stich." The term Berg (mountain) or Höhe (height) can also be read in lowland landscapes.) Unlike a pass, it is not necessarily intended as a means of crossing a mountain into the neighboring valley. Steigen, for example, is common in the hilly or steeply sloping regions of south-central Germany, where they are used to cross from the valley floor into the surrounding higher terrain.

The term Sattel (German for saddle), on the other hand, clearly refers to the mountain pass's vocation as a “horse's saddle” structure formed in the mountains by the intersection of a ridge line and two talwegs on either side. The narrow indentation between the Tête des Allemands (1,014 m) and the Tête des Russiers (1,187 m) is visible from Lorraine. German-speaking denominations frequently add zur Linden: “from gold to lime trees”. In regional Lorraine French, passes are commonly referred to as “pertuis”, “plain” or “passage”. We spoke of the pertuis d'Estaye (Note: Pronounce it like the French word “taille” and not like the word “taie”.) or the Passage de la Taye. In the Vosges patois language of the Saint-Dié and Remiremont areas, the regional terms for “pertuis”, “potieu” or “pètu” were commonly used to designate a hole, a pass or a narrow passage in the mountain. As with “Steige”, the term “côte” (side) is often used in 19th-century writings. The first prefect of the Vosges, Henri-Zacharie Desgouttes, describes the Col de Bussang without mentioning the word “col” once: “The Moselle has its source in the arrondissement of Remiremont, at the foot of the Côte du Taye, whose highest point, where two hills meet, forms the boundary between the Vosges and Haut-Rhin departments. In contrast, the emphasis is on two hills that meet at the pass.

== Geography ==
=== Location ===
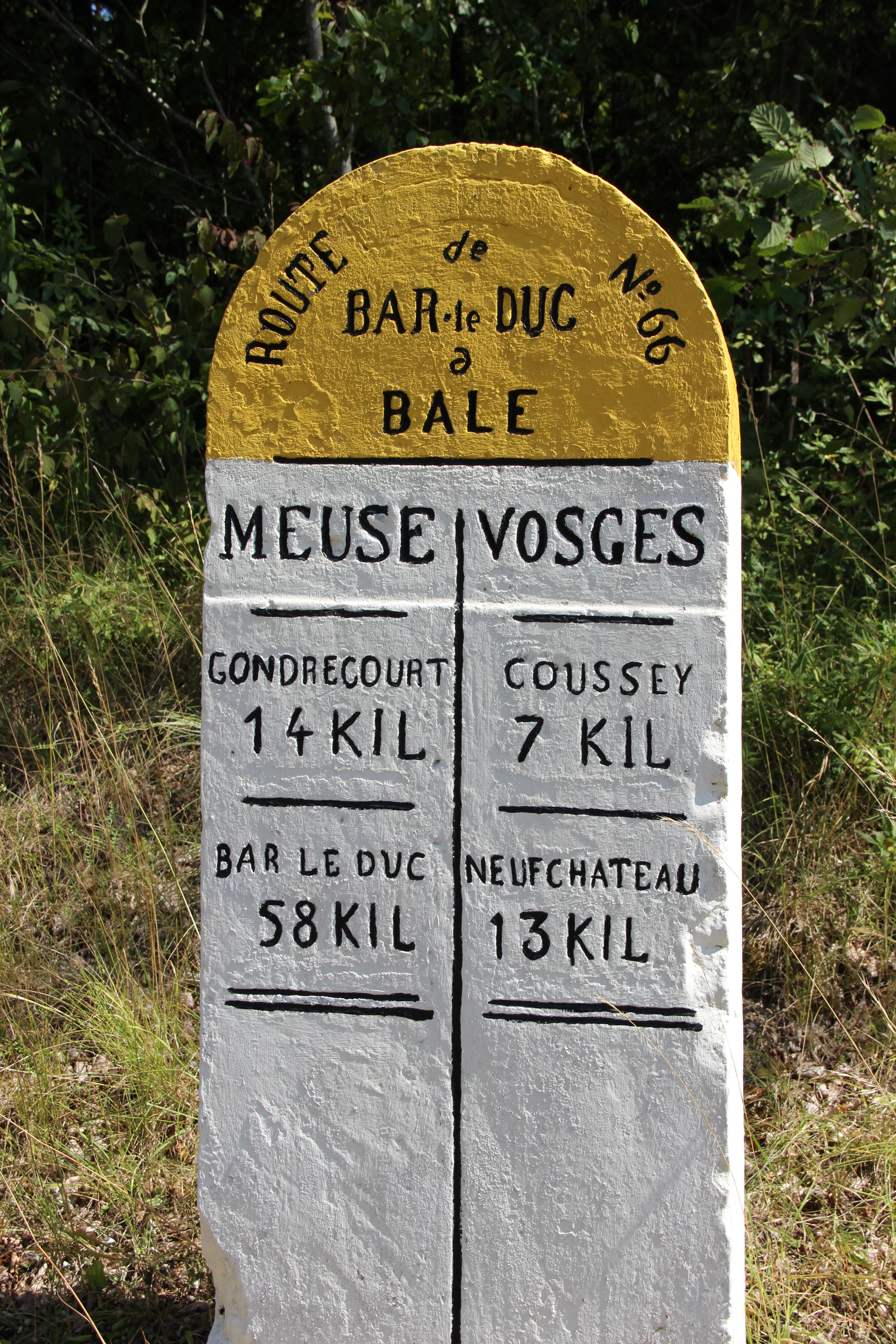
Former milestone of the RN 66 linking the Meuse to the Vosges.

The Bussang Pass is located in the Vosges mountains, on the western side in the commune of Bussang in the Vosges department, and on the eastern side in the commune of Urbès in the Haut-Rhin département, entirely within the Grand Est region. It leads into the upper Thur valley towards Thann.

It is dominated by Grand Drumont (1,200 m) to the north and tête des Neufs-Bois (1,228 m) to the south. It links the Moselle Valley (Trier, Luxembourg, Metz, Épinal) with the Rhine Valley and its main tributary, the Ill (Mulhouse, Basel).

On a more local level, once you've passed the commune of Saint-Maurice-sur-Moselle just before Bussang in the Ballons des Hautes-Vosges community of communes, there's no other route than to continue towards the Bussang Pass on the RN 66. At Saint-Maurice, you can take the RD465 to the Col du Ballon d'Alsace, heading for Belfort or Masevaux on the RD 466. The roads in this part of the Vosges massif run up against the ridges at the bottom of the wooded valley. Apart from the main road, there is only one forestry road open to traffic, providing access to the farmhouse inn at the foot of Drumont.

=== Road traffic ===
In 2016, average annual daily traffic on the Bussang-Fellering section, with the pass at its center, amounted to 5,500 vehicles on the Lorraine side and 3,600 vehicles on the Alsatian side at Urbès. The proportion of heavy goods vehicles is estimated at 21% on the Lorraine side and 17% on the Alsatian side. The number of vehicles per day on this section of the RN 66 has not changed significantly since 2010. In contrast, the number of vehicles on the Alsatian side of the pass has increased by 36% since 2008. All-vehicle road traffic between 2006 and 2008 recorded at the permanent station on the Bussang Pass shows: 4,118 in 2006, 4,099 in 2007, and 4,024 in 2008. The decline in HGV traffic on the Bussang Pass began in the early 2000s, with a 37.4% drop in the daily number of HGVs between 2004 and 2008 (from 1,336 to 962) Since the construction of new expressways such as the RN 57 or the A4 freeway at the Col de Saverne, the routes used by HGVs to link Lorraine and Alsace have changed significantly, passing either to the north or to the south and avoiding crossing the crests.

Average daily traffic on the RN 66 therefore falls as you approach or cross the pass (8,500 at Saint-Maurice-sur-Moselle, 5,500 before Bussang), then rises very rapidly on the Alsace section between Fellering and Thann (20,250 vehicles). The possibility of branching off onto the RD 465 at Saint-Maurice-sur-Moselle towards Belfort reduces average daily traffic by 35% on the section towards the Bussang Pass. Of all the passes crossing the Vosges, the Bussang Pass remains well-frequented given the general downward trend in crossings, with a variation of -1.8%, in line with the average for the entire Vosges mountains. At the Saverne toll plaza, the fall was 1.6% before 2010. The two passes with the biggest declines are the Bonhomme (-7.9%) and Sainte-Marie (-7.6%) passes, while on the RN 59 at the Lièpvre station, there was a 2% increase following the reopening of the Maurice-Lemaire tunnel.

=== Hydrography ===
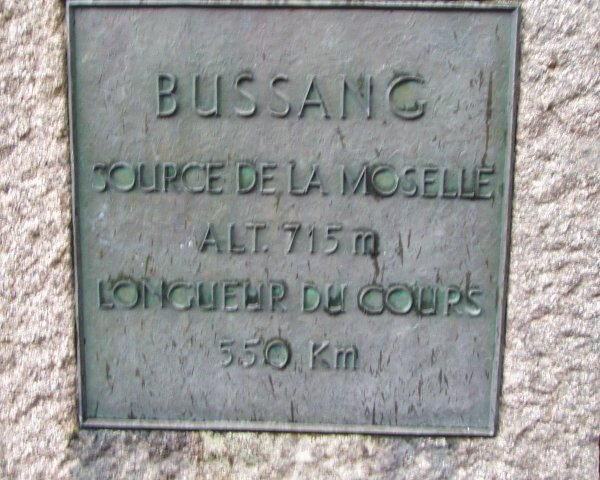
Plaque indicating the source of the Moselle.

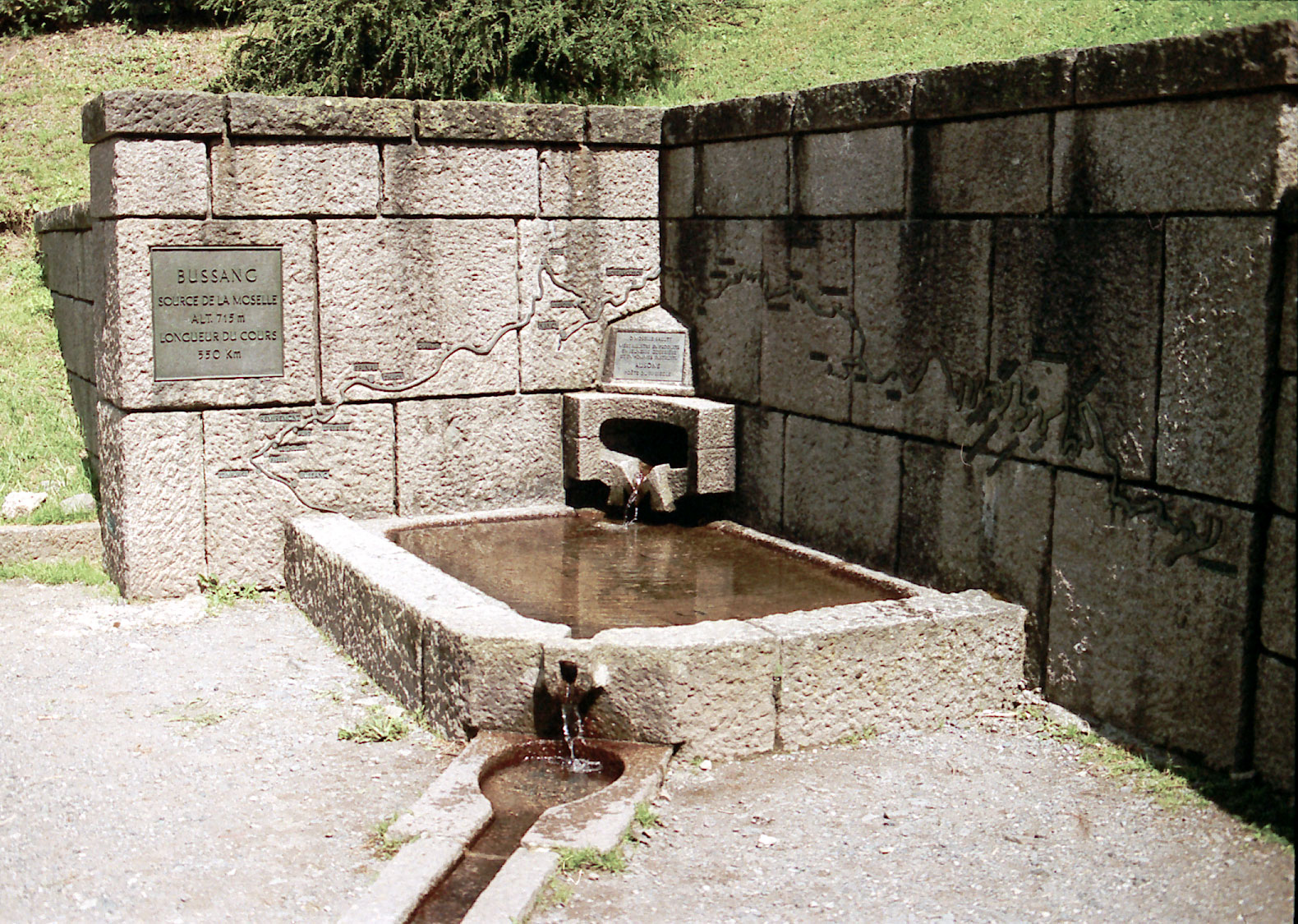
The source of the Moselle near the Bussang pass.

Just before the ascent to the pass, the Moselle forms a fork that can be seen on the sketch of the stubble fields below:

- to the northeast, the valley of the Ruisseau de la Hutte, separated from the pass by the Haut du Charat, 996 m;
- to the southeast, the valley of the Sèchenat stream, separated from the pass by the tête des Allemands, 1,014 m, and fed by the Devant drop;
- to the east in the center, the Moselle River, whose source is immediately fed by other springs named Fontaine des Bôculons (Note: Bôculon, beuquillon, means “lumberjack” in Vosges dialect.) and Fontaine Saint-Louis respectively at the foot of Drumont, 1,200 m.

Above the pass is Etang Jean at the foot of the Côte des Russiers.

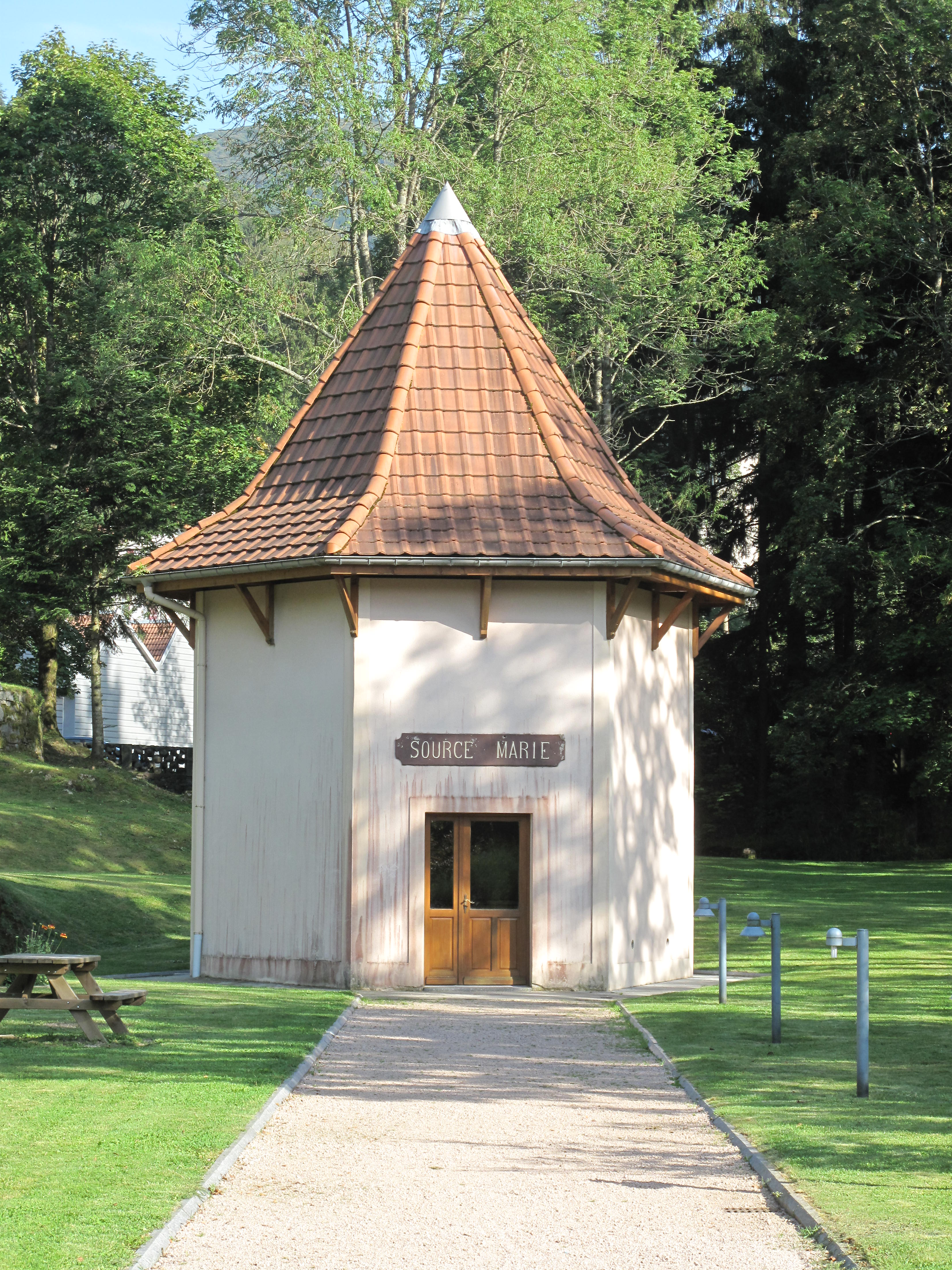
The Marie spring in the place called Taye on the way up the pass.

After Bussang, on the way to the pass and the Taye annex, the road and street names are quite evocative, reminding us that there was a great deal of thermal activity all around the pass: “avenue des sources” or “route des sources”. It was customary for the “bathers” of Plombières-les-Bains to go to the Ballon d'Alsace and the thermal waters of Bussang. The sources of ferruginous mineral water should not be confused with the source of the Moselle. The first prefect of the Vosges, Henri-Zacharie Desgouttes, explains in his “Tableau statistique des Vosges” that “the Moselle has its source in the arrondissement of Remiremont, at the foot of the Taye hill”. The springs were first tapped in 1705. A hotel was built, as well as a chapel, a promenade, and a bathhouse. All the buildings at the springs near the pass were burnt down in 1790, and it was decided not to rebuild them. From then on, the only activity was to sell bottled water.

The Bussang mineral waters (Note: In the statistical table of Desgouttes, page 57, we read the following extract: "Among the large number of mineral and thermal waters that beneficent nature has provided to the Vosges department, the best known and most accredited by their salutary effects, are those of Bains, Bussang, Contrexéville and Plombières.") that gush out around the pass are mentioned in a 19th-century testimonial as follows: “We arrived at Saint-Maurice in time to see the source of the Bussang waters, which emerge from the lawn into a delightful meadow, populated by beautiful black cows. It's a charming place, and Bussang fountain water is better than Champagne wine. From there, we went to see the source of the Moselle, which is a stone's throw from the other source; Moselle water has no medicinal virtues, but it becomes a great river.” According to Prefect Desgouttes, “the waters of Bussang are acidic and contain a lot of carbonic acid gas. They are renowned for their effectiveness in a large number of chronic illnesses, notably those of the stomach, liver, and uterus.”

=== Natural environment ===
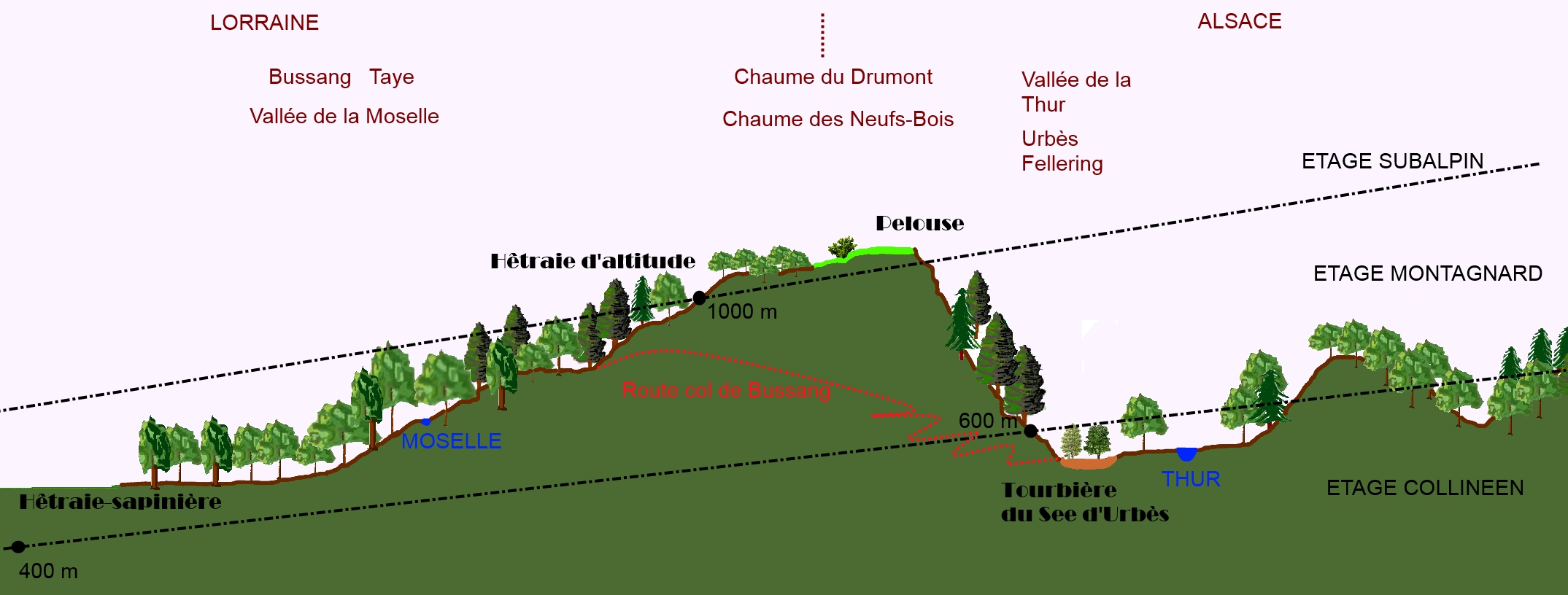
Vegetation levels of the southern Vosges at the Bussang pass.

The Saint-Maurice and Bussang mountains, where the pass is located, is a Natura 2000 type B site on the Lorraine coast, rated as good for the dominant forest habitat and excellent for the overall assessment of slope and scree forests.

Ecological information on the site sheet shows that 84% of the area is mixed forest in the Luzulo-Fagetum beech forest, no. 9110 of the French National Inventory of Natural Heritage's “Habitat-Fauna-Flora” Directive. This luzula beech forest is strongly associated with the white fir and Norway spruce typical of the mid-mountain regions of eastern France, found mainly in the Hercynian massifs of central Europe and the siliceous Northern Alps. It is complemented by fir-beech woodland with wood fescue and subalpine beech woodland in the parts of Alsace below the stubble.

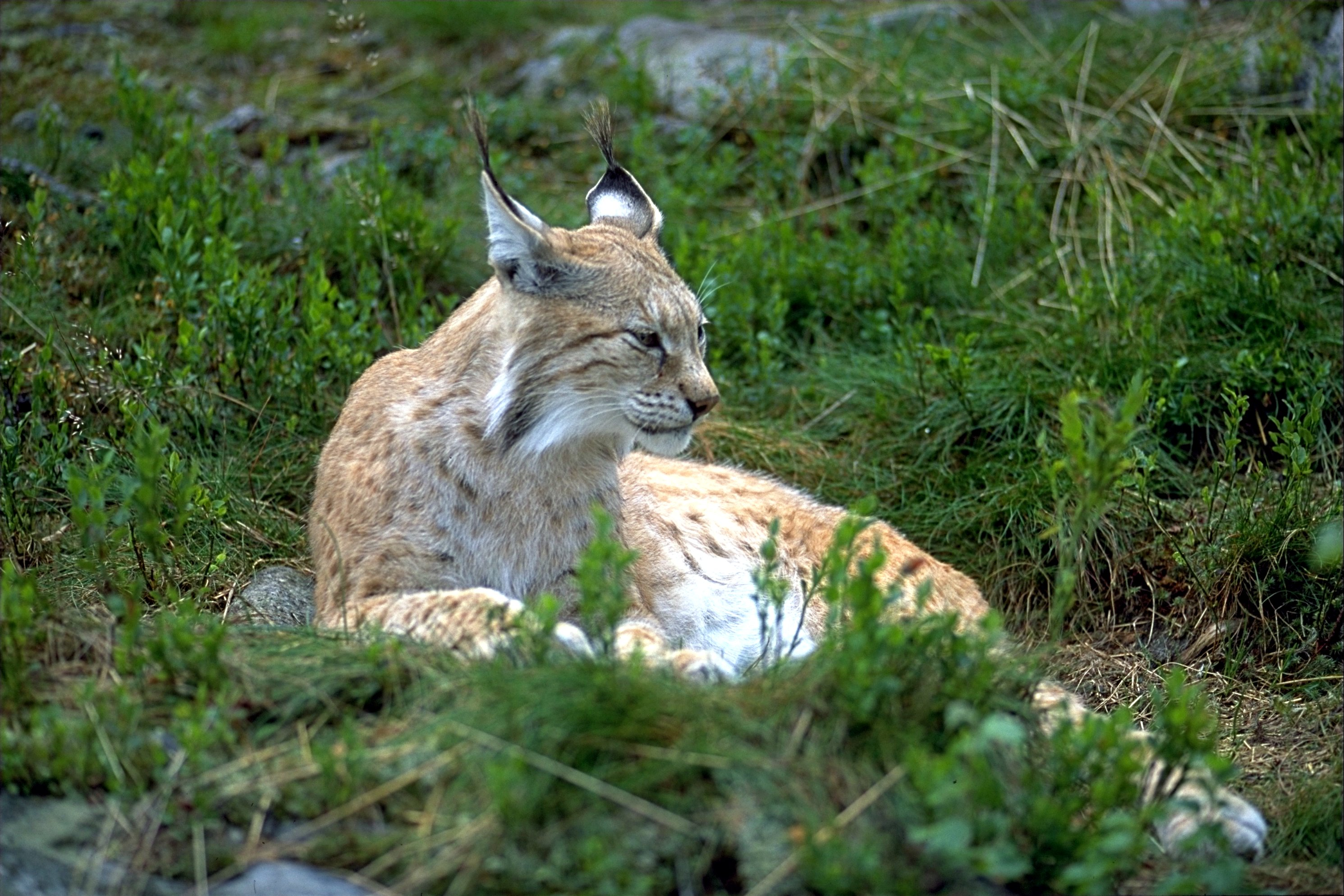
Presence of the lynx in the southern Vosges.

The additional Natura 2000 classification of Rouge-Gazon and Neufs-Bois took place in 2010 and covers the main ridge of the massif south of the Bussang Pass. The vegetation cover is of the same mountainous type as far as the alpine grasslands of the thatch. The only existing building in 1910 was a summer pasture farmhouse that also served as a farmhouse inn. Today, it has been enlarged and modernized to welcome skiers, most of whom are local.

On the Alsatian side, the Bussang Pass opens onto the Natura 2000 site designated “Vosges du Sud ”, also located in the overall habitat of the Luzulo-Fagetum beech forests, mostly beech-fir or high-altitude beech forests. The occasional lynx has been recorded here. The pass leads directly into the valley of glacial origin where Urbès lies, a trace of the last glaciations in the Vosges, particularly the Würm. The former glacial lake has been partially transformed into floating peat bogs and low marshes (mosaic with sedge meadows) with protected willow and alder swamps. The site is classified as Natura 2000 under the Habitats Directive and the Birds Directive.

The plant and animal species of Community interest in the area around the Bussang Pass, from Drumont to Rouge-Gazon, are identical to those found at other sites in the southern Vosges: bruchie des Vosges, Buxbaumia viridis, European bullhead, Marsh fritillary, Austropotamobius pallipes, Hazel grouse, Greater mouse-eared bat, Western capercaillie, Brook lamprey, lynx, Geoffroy's bat, Red-backed shrike, Bechstein's bat.

In addition, the entire Saint-Maurice-Bussang mountains and the Vosges du Sud on the Alsatian side are part of the Ballons des Vosges Regional Nature Park.

=== Geology ===
Geologically, the Bussang Pass belongs to the Oderen series of schists, greywacke, and arkoses dating back to the Lower Viséan, the penultimate Mississippian stage of the Carboniferous. Locally, this is known as the volcano-sedimentary complex of the Saint-Maurice-sur-Moselle forest. The whole area around the pass is of the sedimentary basement type, i.e. more or less ancient and eroded terrain made up of sedimentary rocks. From a lithological point of view, these are layers of metamorphic, sedimentary, and volcanic rocks: schist, greywacke, arkose, breccia, and keratophyre.

The Oderen series is bounded by the Drumont to the north, the tête des Allemands to the south, the Eichwald de Fellering to the east and the Broche à Bussang to the west. It, therefore, forms a narrow band between two larger geological areas: a large area of the volcanic complex with tuffs, lavas, and keratolytic breccias to the south of the pass, and the crystalline massif of calc-alkaline porphyrin granite with biotite and amphibole of the ridges characteristic of the Namurian to the north of the pass.

Islets of the Oderen-Malvaux series outcrop in the volcanic complex, characterized by diabases, opilites, and gabbros on the Neufs Bois and Rouge Gazon summits. Traces of quartz microsite to microgranite associated with ridge granite can also be seen in the predominant sedimentary basement around the Col de Bussang.

Drilling and coring carried out in 1968 at the Col de Bussang indicated the following layers according to depth:

- up to 1.75 m depth, slope scree with red sand and fragments of metamorphic rock;
- up to 2.60 m, highly crumbled and brittle metamorphic rocks;
- up to 4.10 m, highly fragmented and brittle schistose metamorphic rocks;
- up to 10.95 m, highly fractured schistous metamorphic rocks with decompressed parts;
- up to 12 m, more compact metamorphic rock.

=== Climate ===
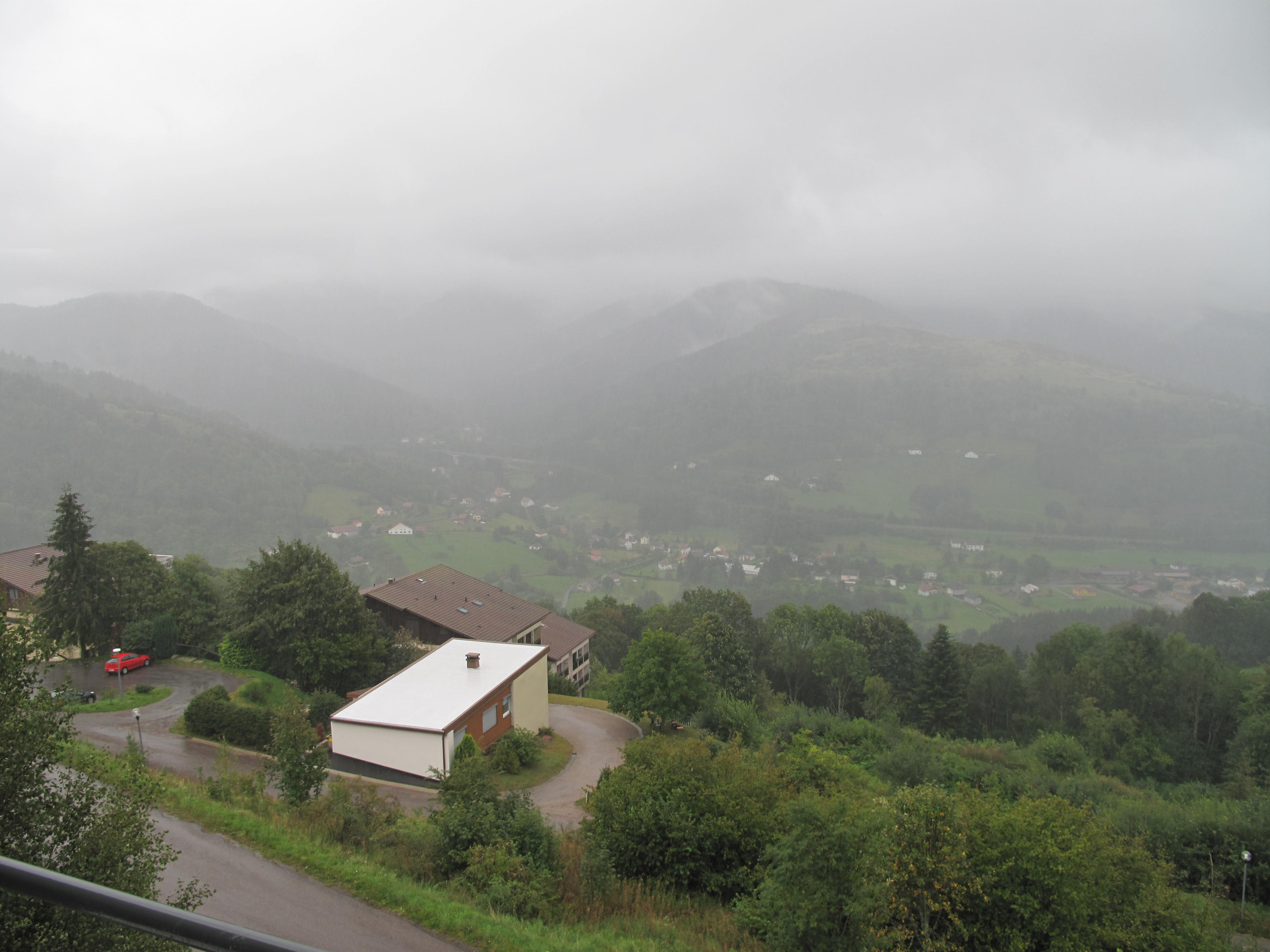
View of the Bussang pass drowned in clouds.

The mountainous part of the Vosges department has cold winters and heavy summers with thunderstorms. The climate is semi-continental, with a dual influence marked by the north–south orientation of the massif, which exposes it mainly to south-westerly winds and the effect of altitude. The closer you get to the Ballon d'Alsace, the higher the rainfall. As the Bussang Pass is located at this angle at the extreme southeast of the Vosges department, annual rainfall varies between 1,700 and 2,000 mm. Rainfall is highest on the two summits on either side of the pass. The average temperature at Bussang Center (599 m high) is 8.1 °C. It drops by around 0.73 °C at the pass, then continues to fall in hundred-meter increments, as in other mountain ranges. The average annual altitudinal gradient for the Vosges is 0.52 °C/hm on the adret and 0.68 °C/hm on the maximum. July is the hottest month, with an average temperature of 16.9 °C at the bottom of the pass. January is the coldest, with −0.6 °C at the bottom of the pass. However, as the Vosges mountain climate is irregular in terms of both frost days and rainfall totals, rainfall can exceed 2,000 mm, even at the bottom of the valley, depending on the year.

The average duration of snow cover at the Bussang Pass, as in the Vosges mountains in general, is 65 days a year. This rises to 85 days towards the first summits below 1,000 m and doubles to 130 days above 1,100 m altitude. In recent decades, however, snow cover has been lower than the general average. Snow cover no longer stays on the ground as long as it did in the first part of the 20th century. Numerous thaws melt the snow. Nearby ski resorts such as Rouge Gazon and Bussang-Larcenaire cannot survive without snow cannons. The Larcenaire resort uses 52 cannons capable of snowmaking 80% of the ski area.

The average wind speed is around 60 km/h. Gusts only affect the stubble and summits, reinforcing the frost effect in winter and drying out in summer. Fog and high fog affect the ridge in spring and summer but are more confined to the valley floor in winter and autumn. This results in less sunshine, with an average of 1,500 hours per year.

The perception of climate at the pass level depends not only on the degree of progress made in road and transport technology but also on the climatic changes that the Vosges mountains have undergone over the centuries. Thanks to technological progress, improved traffic conditions, and snowmaking services, the low-altitude Bussang Pass no longer represents a major obstacle for travelers. In contrast, Arthur Rimbaud's letter to Genoa, dated November 17, 1878, takes us back only a century and a half, to the time when the author wanted to cross the Bussang Pass in winter. He wanted to reach Italy by the shortest route in the 19th century from Chuffilly-Roche in the Ardennes. He took the train to Remiremont, then a stagecoach to Wesserling station in Alsace, bound for Mulhouse. Because the snow cover at the pass was too deep, he was forced to spend the night at the auberge-relais and cross the pass on foot:

On the straight line from the Ardennes to Switzerland, wanting to reach the German connection at Wesserling from Remiremont, I had to cross the Vosges; first by stagecoach, then on foot, as no stagecoach could travel in more than fifty centimeters of snow on average and in a reported storm.

— Arthur Rimbaud

== History ==
=== Gallo-Roman period ===
The Latin name of the stage at the foot of the Bussang Pass was Wixenterius; it later became Visentine for a few centuries, referring to Saint-Maurice-sur-Moselle and its annex Bussang. It lies on the secondary Roman road from Trier and Metz to Augusta Raurica, now in Switzerland near Basel. Roman roads often took over and improved existing Gallic routes, as in the case of the junction between the Leucans and the Sequans or Lingons via the upper Moselle.

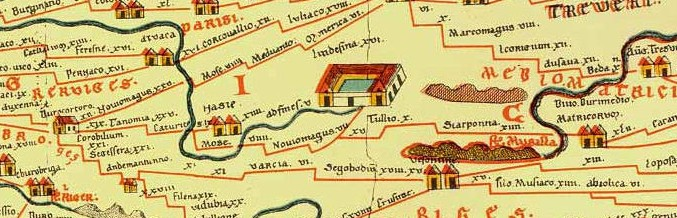
The two viae publicae skirting the Vosges in the Peutinger Table.

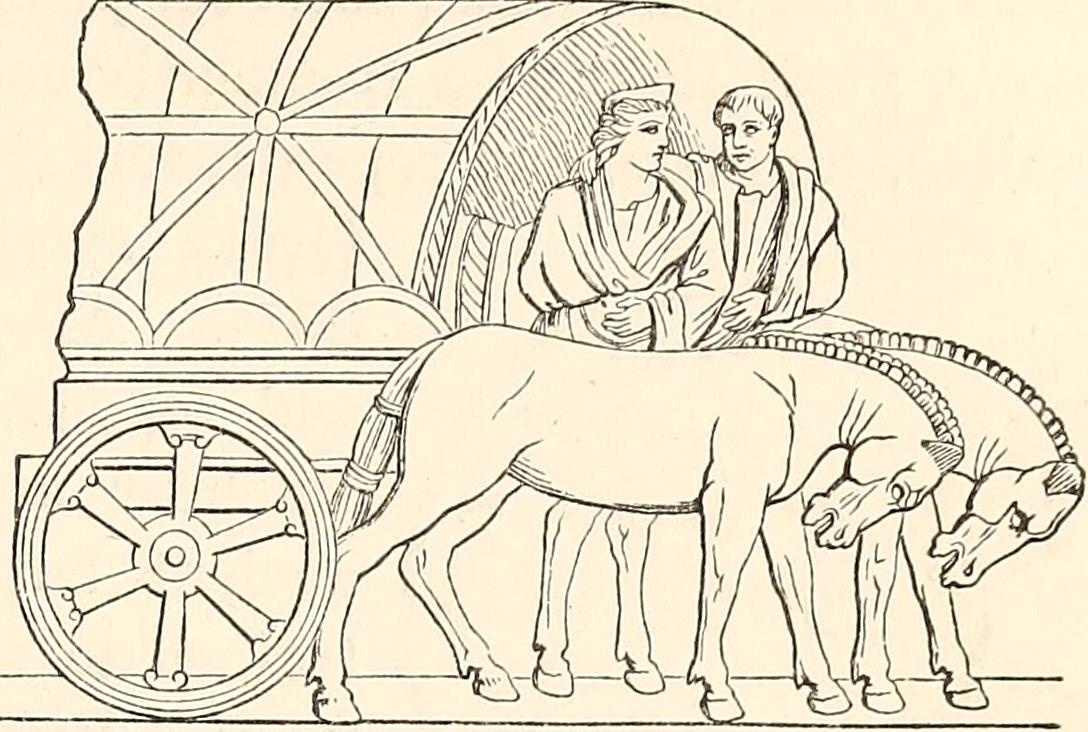
The Gallo-Roman essetum type car.

This is a via vicinalis, or secondary road, which at Illzach, in Latin Uruncis, branches off from the via publica, the main Roman road Argentoratum-Vesontio (Strasbourg - Besançon), to enter the Thur valley and cross the Vosges at the Col de Bussang. The Moselle route continues towards Létraye, Vecoux, and Remiremont and then leaves the Vosges to join another via publica: Lugdunum-Augusta Treverorum (Lyon - Trier) via the Lingones capital, Andemantunnum (Langres). The Peutinger table indicates the two major axes, but not the secondary route. It is, however, described in Antonin's itinerary. The secondary roads were often built by the legions with the help of the local inhabitants. At regular intervals, there were rest stops every 15 km, known as mutations, to change mounts and have a snack, and every 40 km, mansionis; these were run by a manceps or praepositus mansionis for five years. In busy areas, such as the Reims-Metz-Strasbourg Roman road, Vicus or rural settlements grew up around these mansionis. Originally, they were built for the cursus publicus, the equivalent of the official postal service. But they were soon extended by several buildings, as they served as stopping-off points or lodgings for itinerant travelers and merchants. People traveled from one mansio to another. They were often U-shaped, with stables, carriage spaces, dormitories, and refectories. Occasionally, there were also thermal baths. Not so in Bussang.

At the bottom or top of the steeper slopes, the stopover lodge had additional draught animals to help the teams up or down. The Col de Saverne at Usspann is a good illustration of the difficulty of descending a Vosges hill. People were transported on the essedum, already used by the Gauls, but also on the rheda, which had the advantage of being narrower and better suited to narrow paths such as those on the natural valley bottoms of mountain ranges or petorrita. However, compared with Route Royale 66, the old Roman vicinal road from Fresse-sur-Moselle took the slope of the Lait hillside to avoid what was then a very marshy valley floor. The same road was still in use in the 17th century, although the Dukes of Lorraine asked for it to be rebuilt in 1615 and again in 1630. Goods were mainly transported using the various plaustrum variants.

=== Medieval trade routes ===
Medieval trade routes in the southern part of the Vosges mountains, i.e., those along the upper Moselle valley, were those leaving Lorraine at the Bussang Pass towards Alsace, at the Col des Croix and at the Col du Mont de Fourche towards Franche-Comté.

The Col de Taye route follows the ancient Roman road from Metz to Basel (Divodurum - Augusta Basiliensis), perpetuating the tradition of the Bussang Pass transit valley.

==== Taye Pass and Estaye tonnage ====
The spiritual and temporal holdings of the Remiremont chapter in the early Middle Ages were extensive in the southern Vosges mountains, encompassing the valleys of the Vologne, Moselotte, and Haute Moselle rivers, as well as the ridges to the east and south. The revenues of the canonesses were derived from tolls, high pasture, and tonlieux rights, among other sources. As avouésof the chapter, the dukes of Lorraine gradually took over the outlying lands of the noble ladies, building castles such as those at Bruyères and Arches, which were to become the seats of the two mountain provosts of the Lorraine duchy. It was Duke Frederick III who usurped the tonlieu at Bruyères in 1255 and at the Etaye at the Bussang strait in 1264. This stranglehold on the tonnage (Note: In Lorraine, "tonnage" referred to a type of tax that was collected in certain locations. A charter issued by the Archbishop of Trier in 1255, found in chapter 29 of the cartulary of Remiremont, mentions it as follows: "praesata Katherina et sui apud Bruïeras et apud Estaie tonagium imposuerant (Catherine and her companions had imposed a tonage at Bruïeras and at Estaie) [...]". See: Jurisprudence: dédiée et présentée à Monseigneur Hue de Miromesnil, Garde des Sceaux de France [Jurisprudence: dedicated and presented to Monseigneur Hue de Miromesnil, Keeper of the Seals of France] (in French). Vol. 8. Panckoucke. 1789. p. 49.) of l'Estaye (Bussang) and the thonnieu (Note: Another charter, given by Frederick, Duke of Lorraine, in 1295, reported in the same cartulary, chap. 34, calls it thonneu: “dou thonneu de Brueires, cognoissons nous, que nous ne avons droit en panre, ne ou faire panre.”) of Bruyères was no accident, but the result of a territorial strategy on the part of the dukes: in the Middle Ages, these were the main routes for crossing from Lorraine to Alsace via:

- the Moselle Valley: Épinal, Remiremont, Ban de Longchamp, Ban de Ramonchamp and the Bussang Pass;
- The Vologne valley, its tributary the Neuné, the Meurthe valley: Lunéville, Bruyères, Corcieux, Col du Plafond (620 m), Fraize and Col du Bonhomme (978 m).

Another secondary trade and economic route in the Haute-Moselle valley is to the Col des Croix (679 m to Franche-Comté), where the vassals for the left bank of the Moselle, the Lords of Faucogney, established a toll and built Château Lambert, now the commune of Haut-du-Them-Château-Lambert. As with Bussang, the Lorraine part belonged to the extensive Ramonchamp ban, where the Thillot mines were located. The two roads leading to the two passes, Bussang and Les Croix respectively, are known in the archives and popular language on the Lorraine and Comtois sides as Les Vaulx.

The Dukes of Lorraine and the Canons of Remiremont owned another tollgate at the junction of the road from the south and that from the Bussang Pass to the east, known as the Pertuis de l'Estaye, which was the most important trading station with Alsace, known as the Pertuis de L'Etraye (now Létraye). The revenues from the Taye toll justified the establishment of an ennobling office. Before the decline of the trade route, at the height of the Thirty Years' War, the Duke of Lorraine entrusted Jacques Mourel, known as Valroff, with the task of controlling the toll. He arrived in Bussang around 1638 to take over the Taye toll, which had been installed on the Lorraine ducal border since 1255. According to the sources, Jacques Valroff was a page to the Duke of Lorraine, in charge of the Taye toll and lord of Deneuvre. Until mining began in 1560, with the arrival of German, Danish, and Swedish miners, foresters, and charcoal burners, Bussang was an outlier, or even more so, a succession of inns and taverns below the slope that had to be climbed to cross the Vosges. It was a stopping-off point for reinforcement horses before heading for the pass. Thermalisation did not yet exist, and logging to meet industrial demand grew steadily until the 18th century.

Merchants and transporters rarely traveled alone; generally, they organized themselves and moved in “convoys” of traders, either with a cart or on foot carrying a backpack. Additionally, there were pilgrims, travelers, and itinerant workers moving from one construction site to another. Sometimes, they gathered into “nations,” forming communities based on shared language or culture. The “German” merchants included Alsatian and other German-speaking traders. They would cross the Bussang Pass, a gateway to the French-speaking world, at least as far as Metz, a hub of movement in Lorraine due to its location at the crossroads of north–south and east–west routes. During the Middle Ages, transport carts inherited from the Gallo-Roman era were still in use: the two-wheeled cart (plaustrum minus) or the four-wheeled cart (plaustrum majus), drawn by oxen or horses. These carts had limited flexibility and mobility, often requiring an extra horse to climb steep slopes, referred to as “côtes,” a term used more commonly in the past than “col.”

Logistical support from locals persisted until the 18th century, as city archives mention innkeepers and tavern owners, some of whom employed horses solely to guide carts to the Bussang Pass. Carriers also handled errands for individuals and communities. A carriage called “the accelerated” also managed postal services. Furthermore, innkeepers needed to own spacious premises to accommodate people and animals, store vehicles, and shelter horses and oxen.

The goods transported along this Moselle route were largely similar to those circulating on the Rhine axis from Lower Rhineland to Basel, as well as on routes crossing Champagne toward Langres and Switzerland or along the Neckar River. However, specific products varied depending on economic trends or artisanal activities prominent at different points in Lorraine's history. Key transported goods included:

- Wine, with Metz and Cologne handling most of the traffic.
- Glass, such as flat glass, white or colored glass made in the “Lorraine style,” and later, crystalline or “Venetian glass” after a local glassmaker's thirteen-year stay in Murano. These were produced in glassworks around Darney and Fontenoy-le-Château. Pierre Thierry from Fontenoy, for instance, rose professionally to become a broker for major international firms, managing transport between Italy and regions extending from England to Northern Italy via Flanders.
- Wool or textiles, with Flanders remaining a key center of the textile industry, maintained constant relations with Italy as a gateway to the East. Meanwhile, the Moselle served as a link to the Rhine for those bypassing the main route slightly south of the Vosges mountains through the Burgundy Gate.
- Wood is used in royal foundries and manufacturing facilities on both sides of the mountain ridge (Masevaux, Oberbruck, Saint-Maurice-sur-Moselle).
- Salt is transported via the Bussang Pass to Mulhouse and Basel, connecting Lorraine to Switzerland. Lorraine salt was also sold in Upper Alsace (then part of Further Austria), southwestern Germany, and the Swiss border region around the Bishopric of Basel. The “salt rolling” through the Bussang Pass continued until the French Revolution, likely being the last regularly transported product before industrialization and the advent of textiles in the valley. Archives describe the “great salt trade” from Thann to Delle at the Swiss border, noting the Bussang Pass route as so narrow on the ascent (called “die Steige” by the Alsatians) that two carts could not pass each other. Descending carts had to use designated pullouts to allow ascending carts to pass.

==== Progressive Decline of the Trade Route ====
Duchy of Lorraine at the time of its annexation to France in the 18th century.

The Thirty Years’ War (1618–1648), the Ten Years’ War (1634–1644), and the Dutch War (1672–1678) ended regular international trade along the Bussang Pass route between Alsace and Franche-Comté. The decline stemmed from multiple reasons, primarily geopolitical and economic. After these wars, the Vosges passes became territorial borders: Bussang Pass linked to Alsace, which became French (Note: In reality, we must avoid designating Alsace as a homogeneous whole as we know it in the 21st century. In the Treaty of Westphalia, Louis XIV annexed the Décapole, the Sundgau and the vicariate of the Three Bishoprics of Metz, Toul and Verdun.) in 1648 under the Treaty of Westphalia, while Croix Pass connected to Franche-Comté, which joined France in 1678 under the Treaty of Nijmegen. Bussang and the High Vosges remained part of ducal Lorraine until 1766, as shown in historical maps.

Beyond these dates, decades of disorder, pillaging, and war severely disrupted the region, as evidenced by archival documents covering the Vosges mountains, heavily impacted by the Thirty Years’ War. Another economic factor contributing to the decline of the Lorraine-Alsace-Switzerland route was the disruption of traditional trade networks along the Lotharingian axis due to annexed regions adopting French legislation, particularly concerning taxes and tariffs. For instance, Louis XIV introduced the salt tax (gabelle) in Lorraine during its occupation in 1633. Even after Lorraine's annexation, customs duties on goods passing from Lorraine into France persisted, stifling trade opportunities southeast of the Vosges.

A letter from Emperor Rudolf II to Eberhardt, Lord of Ribeaupierre, confirms the abandonment of the ancient Alsace route via the Bussang Pass. The emperor announced his intent to establish a toll office in Sainte-Marie, noting that goods once traveling through Bergheim, Thann, and Belfort—where tolls were collected—were now passing through the Lièpvre Valley toll-free. The route to Thann followed the Moselle Valley via the Bussang Pass and its Taye toll. Thann's fate (Note: Excerpt from Christine Heider's article: "Founded at the end of the 13th century by the Counts of Ferrette, then under the domination of the Habsburgs, the city of Thann had an ambiguous status, because it was both a seigniorial city and the capital of a seigniory. As a seigniorial city, it was placed under the control of the Habsburgs, but benefited from significant autonomy, like certain imperial cities. A prosperous city, the seat of a treasury since 1486, it could be considered the true economic capital of Austrian Upper Alsace. It also exercised an authority over the villages within its jurisdiction that made it almost the equivalent of a territorial lord. […] The linguistic border also passed through the very interior of the seigniory of Thann. The bailiwick in fact included five 'welch' villages. Knowledge of the French language was quite widespread in Thann. Bilingualism was an essential asset for all administrators wishing to exercise positions of responsibility. On the religious level, Thann established itself in the 17th century as one of the main bastions of the Catholic Counter-Reformation in Upper Alsace.) hinged on its geographical position at the entrance to the Thur Valley, controlling access to the Bussang Pass and serving as a transit point between the Empire and the Kingdom of France.

An excerpt from the local historian Louis Jouve's work on Bussang vividly conveys nostalgia for the old Taye Pass route: "Its location at the foot of the Vosges Mountains, far from major cities, made Bussang an ideal stopover on the route from Metz to Basel. Carriers and travelers of all kinds made mandatory halts here between Thann and Remiremont, as the distance was far too great for a single day’s journey given the poor state of roads, nearly impassable in the early 18th century for large transports or troops. Money circulated more abundantly, and relations with the outside world became more active and frequent once the roads crossing the Vosges were rectified and improved. Ah! The carriers with their enormous transport carts, the mail coaches, and the 'accelerated,' the old folks say—what movement, what animation, what commercial activity Bussang once saw! You young ones cannot imagine it!"

=== Troop Movements, Garrisons, and Conflicts ===
==== Burgundian War (1474–1477) ====
===== 1473: The Passage of Charles the Bold with Philip the Good's Remains =====
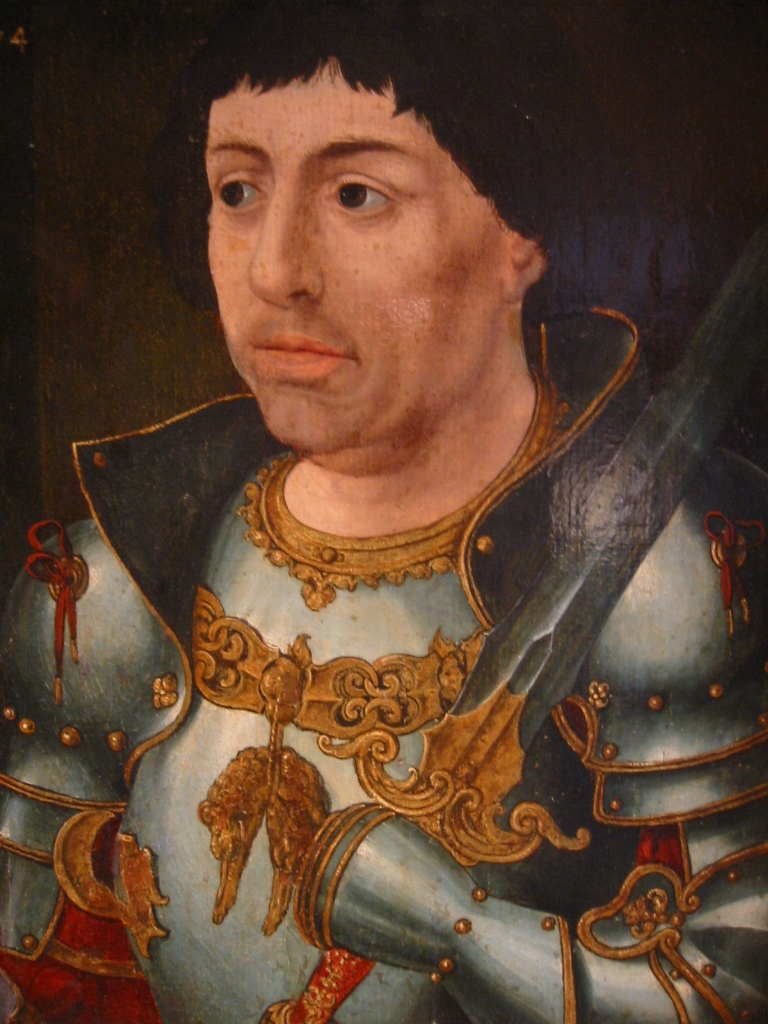
Charles the Bold, Duke of Burgundy, wishing to invade Lorraine in the 15th century.

Before the occupation of Lorraine during the Burgundian War in 1475, there was already a precedent. In Wars of the Past and Lessons of Today, a patriotically tinged account highlights the border role of the Bussang Pass as follows:

"In September 1473, he [Charles the Bold] appeared in Nancy, under the slightly moved gaze of the very young René II, duke since the day before, escorting the body of his father, Philip the Good, from Bruges to the sepulchral chapel in Dijon. His arrival in Nancy was from the north, via the traditional route of the Bouxières Bridge, and his departure was to the south through the land of the Neufchâtel family, then through Charmes, Épinal, Remiremont, the Estaye Pass, a defile near Bussang where stood the last castle of Lorraine’s borders, which would later be guarded by the first fortress of the high Moselle defensive curtain at Ballon de Servance. Thus, the ducal coffin passed through Charmes, very close to Domrémy, and Philip the Good ended his last journey in our country—a man who, after once seizing Good Lorraine in Compiègne, had sold it to the English. And it was here, moreover, in this very duchy, that within just two years, his dynasty would permanently collapse.”

===== The Moselle Route =====
The same Memoirs note that the Burgundians were well-acquainted with the Moselle route. Nobles from Burgundy, including the lords of Neufchâtel, had seized key sites within the Duchy of Lorraine, such as the formidable fortress of Châtel: "Already, a Neufchâtel occupies the episcopal seat of Toul, and a Marguerite of Neufchâtel sits on the abbatial throne of Remiremont: from end to end, the long Moselle road is open, the fracture ready to split Lorraine in two: the Master [Charles the Bold] may enter." This war concluded with the death of the Duke of Burgundy at the Battle of Nancy on January 5, 1477.

==== Thirty Years’ War and the Ten Years’ War ====
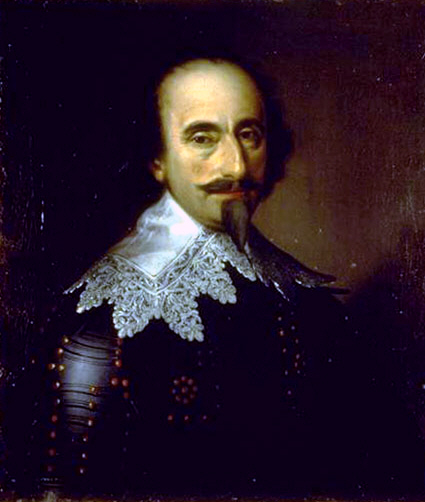
Henri II de Rohan, oil by Samuel Hofmann, three years before his Valtellina campaign which led him to cross the Bussang pass in difficult conditions.

===== Closure of the Pass in 1630 =====
The Duke of Lorraine, pursuing a policy of neutrality during the Thirty Years’ War, realized that France, under the geopolitical calculations of Cardinal Richelieu and King Louis XIII, would take advantage of the chaos in Central Europe to expand its borders eastward. Nevertheless, the first French occupation of Lorraine occurred only in 1633. Anticipating such moves, Lorraine's authorities closed the Bussang Pass to block enemy troops from traversing the High Vosges. Devastating raids were carried out in neighboring Alsatian valleys to discourage incursions into the poorly fortified Lorraine.

Another reason for closing the Bussang Pass lay in public health concerns: the plague had been reported in 1630 in Thann, the gateway to the Thur Valley on the Alsatian side.

===== January 1635: The Valtellina Campaign =====
The upper Moselle Valley once again served as a transit route between Lorraine and Italy. Charles IV of Lorraine allied with the Imperial forces, had set up winter quarters in Vieux-Brisach. After the defeat at Nördlingen, France, aligned with the Protestant camp, increasingly joined the conflict to sever Imperial communication with Italy and prevent Spanish troops from joining Catholic forces across the Alps. To achieve this, Louis XIII reconciled with his former enemy, Henri II, Duke of Rohan, a skilled and respected commander. Rohan took command of the Valtellina corps within the Army of Italy, led by the Duke of Harcourt. He was tasked with capturing Belfort and Brisach, still in Imperial hands, and then occupying the Valtellina to secure all mountain passes leading from Switzerland to Italy or Tyrol via the Upper Inn Valley. The Valtellina expedition was to remain secret to prevent Spanish or Lorraine spies from thwarting the plan.

Lieutenant General Henri de Rohan joined his troops in Rambervillers, annexed by France in 1552 and surrounded by ducal Lorraine lands, on January 6, 1635. He departed with ten regiments (Note: 1. Champagne Regiment; 2. Montausier Regiment; 3. Canisy Regiment, 4. La Meilleraye-la-Porte Regiment, 5. Biès Regiment, 6. Dannevaux Regiment; 7. La Poisse-Saint-Offrange Regiment; 8. Cerny Regiment (regiment raised by the Count of Cerny in March 1636 and disbanded on June 22, 1639): Susane, Louis (1877). Histoire de l'infanterie française [History of the French Infantry] (in French). Vol. 5. Dumaine. p. 261.; 9. Serres Regiment (regiment raised on March 20, 1635 by Jean de Béon, Count of Serres, disbanded in 1638 Susane (1877, p. 261); 10. Vendy Regiment.) under the command of François Thibault. Seven regiments (about 4,000 men) and six cavalry squadrons (about 400 horses) (Note: Albrici writes: “In 1635, at the end of March, he suddenly occupied the borders of the country near Chiavenna and Bormio, in the lower Engadine, near Landquart and at Luziensteig. At the same time he had personally led a French corps of 4,000 infantry and 300 cavalry from Alsace into the Grisons.”) reached the Valtellina. Along the way, Rohan also integrated Landé's troops, two Swiss regiments, and seven Grison regiments. However, units were lost due to severe weather in the Vosges, sieges of cities like Belfort, and other challenges. Some troops were left behind to secure conquered territories. Richelieu pressed Rohan to move quickly toward Italy, (Note: On January 27, 1635, the ministers immediately sent the supervisor of the Bullion finances with mulets loaded with silver and everything needed for Rohan's mission in the Valteline.) advising against delays, even for Belfort or Brisach.

Rohan lamented in his correspondence the "robberies and killings by locals" in the border regions, (Note: These are excursions by pro-Lorraine civilians and soldiers who have taken refuge on the Franche-Comté side of the Vosges ridge in the bailiwick of Amont-et-Effreney.) illnesses, and poor conditions between the plains and the Bussang Pass. On January 16, 1635, he wrote from Épinal that he had to slow his pace to avoid losing his infantry to the snow. By January 21, he reached Remiremont, writing: "Had I left six days earlier, I would have lost half our infantry." From there, he advanced along the Moselle Valley, closing and controlling routes into Franche-Comté with four regiments and two companies under Baron de Montausier's command. He continued with the rest of his troops under “constant rains” and faced snow when crossing the Bussang Pass with artillery (nine cannons, 37 munitions carts) and infantry.

The Vosges crossing proved grueling. Writing from the Dannemarie camp on February 10, 1635, Rohan stated: "I fear losing many soldiers. There’s no remedy; all difficulties must be overcome." A letter dated February 8 from Roppe and another from Dannemarie two days later highlight the arduous journey of less than 25 km, which took days. His troops took about ten days to reach Saint Gall, four days to Coire, and twelve more to arrive in the Valtellina. (Note: The route with the staging camps of the army of Henry II of Rohan passed through: Rambervillers, Épinal, Remiremont, Bussang pass, Roppe, Dannemarie, Basel, Liestal, Oltingen, Brugg, Regensbruck, Winterthur, Elgg, Rickenbach, Saint-Gall, Altstätten, Sax, Bad Ragaz, Chur, Chiavenna, Morbegno. It is in fact a very old route which passed either by the Splügen pass or by the Septimer or the San Bernardino.) His headquarters in the Italian Alps was established in Morbegno and moved to Tirano in June 1635.

===== November 1638 =====
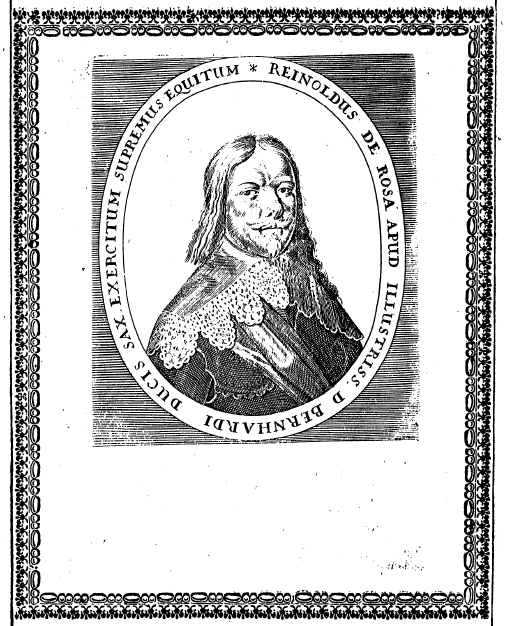
Reinhold von Rosen in the service of the Protestant armies.

Duke Charles IV leaves Franche-Comté, where he had sought refuge following the French occupation of his duchy, with approximately 4,000 men, aiming to rescue Breisach (modern-day Vieux-Brisach) from Protestant forces. Passing through Épinal and Remiremont, he continues via the Bussang Pass to reach the Thur Valley. However, he fails to reach Breisach as Weimarian troops, particularly their cavalry, halt him at Thann. Many Lorraine nobles are captured, and about 600 Lorrainers join Bernard of Saxe-Weimar's service. On November 18, 1638, Lorrainers hold Te Deum services in many parishes, thanking God for sparing their sovereign.

===== 1639 =====
Bernard of Saxe-Weimar sends von Rosen and Kanowski to seize Thann, ordering Rosen to prevent the Lorrainers from approaching. Rosen crosses the Vosges, defeating a regiment of Charles IV at Saint-Dié, before advancing to Épinal, even though the city was under the control of Du Hallier, Governor of Lorraine. Rosen then returns to Thann via the Alsace route.

==== Dutch War ====
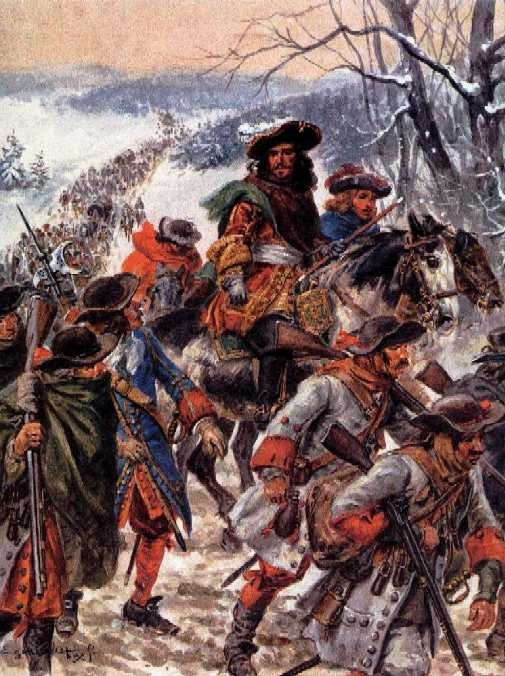
Crossing the Vosges via Turenne in winter.

During the Dutch War, Turenne spends three days in December 1674 resting his troops in Rambervillers. He proceeds through Padoux and Éloyes towards Épinal and Remiremont. The lords of Allamont and Majastre, who had recently liberated the first and second cities for the Duke of Lorraine, retreat hastily, doubting they could withstand Turenne's forces. Marshal de Créquy joins Turenne in Épinal to pursue the Lorrainers towards Upper Alsace via the Moselle Valley and the Bussang Pass. The pursuit ends with Turenne's victory at the Battle of Turckheim on January 5, 1675. By leading his troops unexpectedly over several Vosges passes in the harsh winter, Turenne secures an initial victory that allows him to take Strasbourg.

Some sources claim Turenne himself crossed the Bussang Pass, (Note: In the work of Louis Spach Dominique Dietrich, ammeistre of Strasbourg, 1857, p. 15, Turenne passes through the Bussang pass.) while others insist he traveled through Franche-Comté via Faucogney. (Note: This is the case, for example, of a school book that clearly speaks of a deception of Turenne's passage through the west. In Albert Malet, Histoire moderne (1498-1715), written in accordance with the official programs of May 31, 1902, Classes de seconde A B C D. Hachette, 1918, p. 628.) He likely coordinated multiple detachments through various passes into the Alsatian plain. The Mémoires de la Société d'archéologie lorraine et du Musée lorrain notes: “Saint-Dié saw the passage of Count Bourlémont, who occupied the Sainte-Marie Pass with 400 men. Finally, Chevalier d'Hocquincourt advanced into the Thur Valley from the Upper Moselle and the Bussang Pass.” The Chevalier, Georges de Monchy, Marquis d'Hocquincourt, was a lieutenant-general of the king's armies in 1655 and knighted in 1688. Supporting this, the 1887 Bulletin de la Société philomatique vosgienne states Turenne departed “from Belfort while his light troops took the direct route via the Bussang Pass and the Thann Valley.” (Note: This quote from an article in a German geography journal adopts the same thesis: “[...] successfully defended the Vosges passes against the troops of Louis XIV in 1674, until Marshal Turenne managed to go on the offensive via Belfort.” See: Hettner, Alfred; Schmitthenner, Heinrich; Kolb, Albert; Teubner, G.B. (1900). Geographische Zeitschrift [Geographical Journal] (in German). Vol. 6. p. 491.) Similarly, the Société belfortaine d'émulation reads: “It is an error: one of Turenne’s lieutenants crossed the Bussang Pass and Saint-Amarin Valley. As for the illustrious general, after taking Remiremont, he passed through Rupt, Faucogney, and Mélisey, where he stayed for two days.” (Note: The date indicates that he would have passed five months later by the Bussang pass: Waick, A. (2013). "Au Col de Bussang. Maison dans laquelle coucha Turenne le 16 juin 1675" [At the Col de Bussang. House in which Turenne slept on June 16, 1675]. vosgescpa.fr (in French).)

==== Old Monarchy and Revolutionary Era ====
In 1749, the companies Le Deuil de l’Hôtel des Invalides and La Cour au Chantre were assigned to Bussang. The second Swiss regiment, which later became the 76th Infantry Regiment in 1791, was part of the Grandvillars regiment under the 2nd Corps led by Count Woldemar de Lowendal. Having served recently during the War of the Austrian Succession (1744–1747), the regiment awaited reassignment. That year, stationed across several northeastern towns, the regiment came under Chevalier Jean-Alexandre de Balthazard's command as colonel on June 15, 1749.

On March 13, 1755, the town of Remiremont protested a 100-livre fine to the Chancellor of Lorraine for failing to maintain the road between Remiremont and Bussang. On August 3, 1790, orders were issued to provide lodging, food, and escorts for the Marquises of Lambert and Nesle, traveling to Alsace via Remiremont and the Bussang Pass.

==== France's Invasion by the Coalition in 1814 ====
On January 4, Schwarzenberg, supreme commander of the allied armies, planned operations for January 6, 7, and 8 during the French Campaign. Four army groups were formed: the 6th Corps under Wittgenstein and the 5th Corps under Field Marshal Wrede formed the "Alsace Army Group." The "Vosges Army Group" consisted of a detachment led by Prince Tcherbatow and the 4th Corps, bolstered by an Austrian heavy battery and Archduke Ferdinand's Austrian Hussar Regiment.

The Bavarian Corps was tasked with seizing Sélestat, supporting the Württembergers at Neuf-Brisach on January 6, 1814, and linking up with Wittgenstein. Schwarzenberg assigned Wittgenstein the mission of occupying Lower Alsace and advancing towards Lorraine via Haguenau, Saverne, and Phalsbourg. The Vosges Army Group targeted Épinal. On January 6, Baron Friedrich Wilhelm von Bülow was ordered to reach Sainte-Croix, then cross the Vosges via the Bussang Pass to follow the Moselle Valley to Remiremont, arriving in Épinal on January 9.

Schwarzenberg directed the 4th Corps to avoid the Bonhomme Pass despite its proximity, instead taking a 40-km detour via Thann and the Bussang Pass (Note: This detour is commented as follows in the work of M.V. Leggiere: “This direction lengthened the march by almost twenty-five miles and would force the troops to trudge through the most inhospitable region of the Vosges.”) to Remiremont and Épinal. To support the Bavarian Corps and link it with the Austrian Corps, the Bohemian Army's headquarters ordered the Württembergers to cross the Vosges, reach Remiremont in the Upper Moselle Valley, and proceed to Plombières-les-Bains and Langres. Don Cossacks, commanded by Platow, were attached to aid this mission. The troops crossed the Vosges sequentially via the Bussang Pass, referred to in German as Büssing Pass.

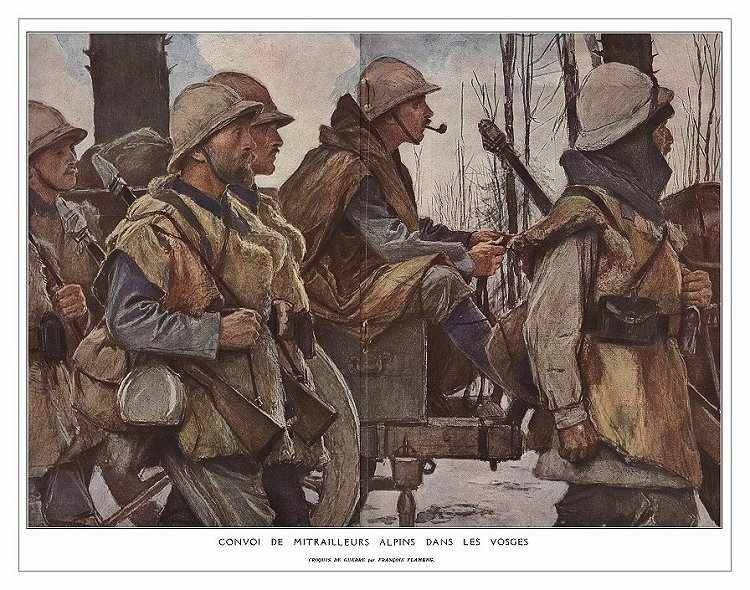
Alpine hunters in the winter landscape of the Vosges, by François Flameng.

==== First World War ====
- 6th Battalion of Alpine Hunters (BCA)

Soldier Jean Forty writes in his journal that the 6th BCA was withdrawn from Artois to be sent to Alsace:

On January 25, 1915, the battalion left Le Thillot, passed through Bussang, crossed the former border at 4 p.m. at the Bussang Pass, and went to billet in Felleringen, in the Thur Valley. On the 26th, it reached Saint-Amarin, which remained until February 11, carrying out defense works in the region.

- 22nd Battalion of Alpine Hunters (BCA)

Victorin Lassiaz, a corporal in the 22nd BCA, 1st Company, recounts departing for war on August 9 from Bourg-Saint-Maurice and arriving in Bussang on the 11th at 6 a.m. He then ascended to the Drumont Chalet for advanced posts, enjoying a "magnificent view of Mulhouse and the Rhine from the orientation table." On the 12th, he descended to the Bussang Tunnel and slept in the forest. On the 13th, the 1st section climbed to the Neuf-les-Bois Chalet to secure a small outpost. He left the Bussang Pass on August 14 with the 12th Battalion of Alpine Hunters, reaching Thann in the evening.

- 41st Infantry Division

Between August 4 and 10, 1914, the 41st Infantry Division was stationed between the Schlucht Pass and the Bussang Pass. It was heavily involved in the Vosges conflicts early in the war.

- 359th Infantry Regiment

The regiment resumed its journey by train from Toul on December 16, 1914, heading to Alsace. Arriving in Bussang the same day, it crossed the Bussang Pass during the night of December 16–17 and billeted in Urbès, arriving around 2 a.m.

==== Second World War ====
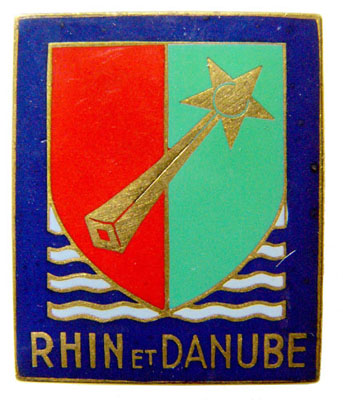
Badge of the 1st Army, Rhine and Danube.

In the autumn of 1944, Allied forces that had landed in Normandy and Provence faced German armies regrouping in the Vosges.

Notes from Captain Petit of the 4th/7th Regiment of African Hunters (RCA), part of the 1st French Army, reveal that on November 26, 1944, the 7th RCA platoons were deployed between Le Thillot and the Bussang Pass for operations targeting the Vosges passes to penetrate Alsace. As German troops retreated to the Bussang Pass, artillery fire on the pass began early in the evening once most of the soldiers had reached Bussang and were stationed near the train station, where the 4th Squadron's command post was located. By November 29, the pass and Drumont Mountain were under French control, except for the tunnel, which remained resistant. On December 1, the engineering corps had to clear a path for the troops waiting below at Bussang, as the tunnel had been destroyed. The following day, the troops crossed the pass using the bypass created by the engineers, who had worked around the blocked tunnel.

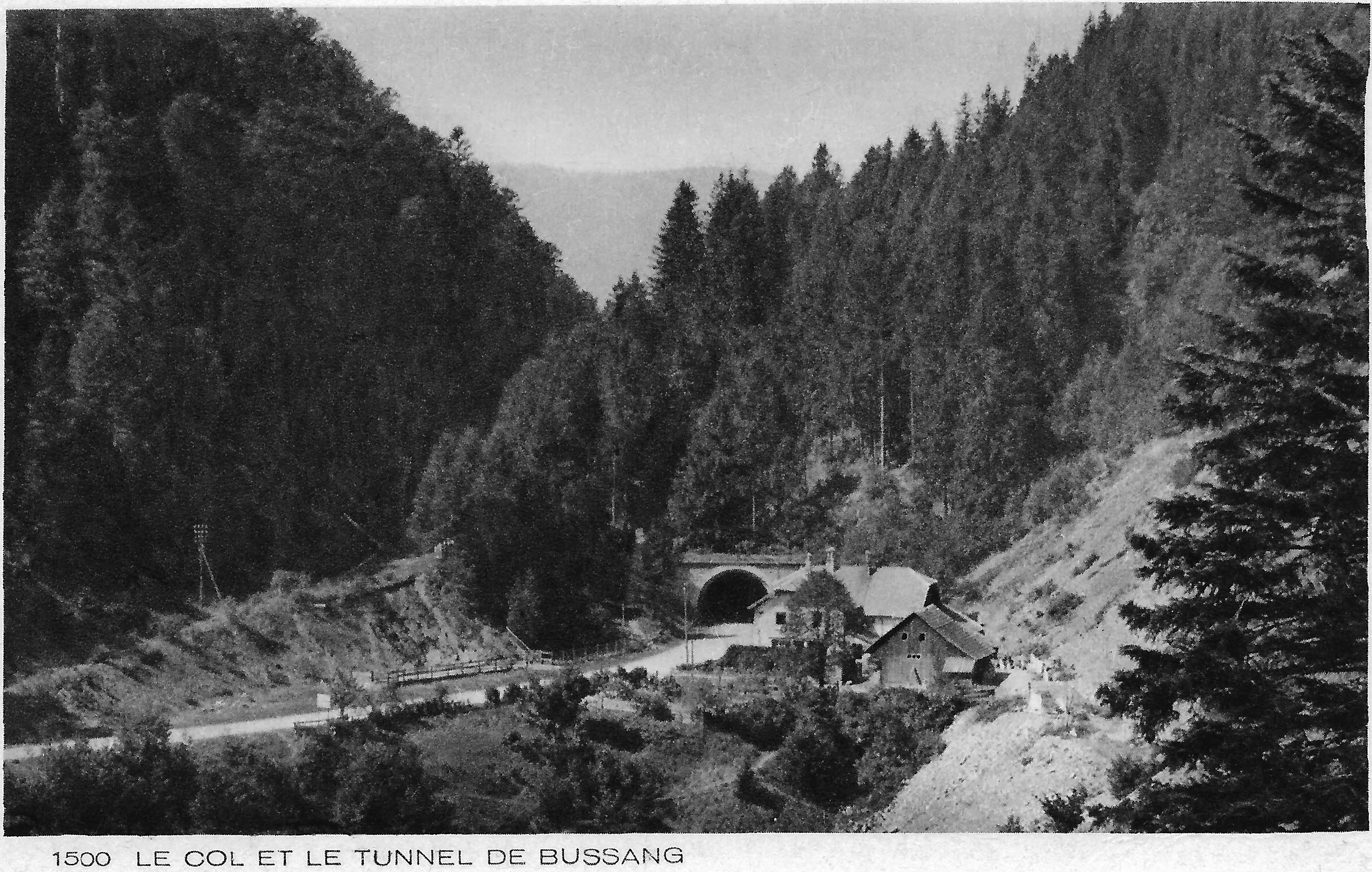
The Bussang tunnel.

German occupation forces defended the Bussang Pass for an extended period and attempted to retake it. The 19th Army, Army Group G, 198th Infantry Division, was still stationed on the Lorraine side in September 1944. The retreat toward the Alsatian flank of the Vosges crest continued relentlessly. Until October 14, 1944, the 64th Army Corps and the 198th Infantry Division, under General major Otto Schiel (September 1944 to January 1945), occupied the sector. After November 1, 1944, the 198th fought alongside the 4th Luftwaffe Field Corps. During clashes with the French 7th RCA troops, the 708th Volksgrenadier Division, commanded by General major Wilhelm Bleckwenn, (Note: This division was composed of the following troops: Grenadier-Regiment 728, Grenadier-Regiment 748, Grenadier-Regiment 760, Feldersatz-Bataillon 1708, Divisions-Füsilier-Bataillon 708, Artillerie-Regiment 658, Pionier-Bataillon 708, Infanterie-Divisions-Nachrichten-Abteilung 708, Divisions-Versorgungs-Regiment 708.) and the 716th Infantry Division, (Note: At the beginning of 1945, it was composed of the following troops: Grenadier-Regiment 706, Grenadier-Regiment 726, Grenadier-Regiment 736, Divisions-Füsilier-Kompanie 716, Artillerie-Regiment 716, Pionier-Bataillon 716, Divisionseinheiten 716.) led by General major Ernst von Bauer, represented the 64th Army Corps and the 19th Army.

=== Border Pass ===
For two millennia, the Bussang Pass has served as a linguistic, cultural, political, and diocesan boundary, as well as a demarcation line for grazing lands and pastures.

==== Linguistic Frontier ====
===== Boundary between Germanic and Romance languages =====
Limits of the Romano-Alemannic languages.

Unlike the passes in the northern and central parts of the Vosges massif, which rarely mark the linguistic boundary between the Romance and Germanic language families—at most delineating variants within the same language subfamilies—the southern passes, such as the Bussang Pass, often coincide with the linguistic frontier between Germania and Romania. This is because the language boundary does not precisely follow the Vosges' ridgeline in the north. Sometimes, Germanic languages extend westward (Northern Vosges, Sarrebourg region), while in other instances, Lorraine dialects cross eastward over the ridges, as is the case with Welche, for example.

The Bussang Pass separates southern Alemannic dialects, as observed at survey point no. 175 in Storckensohn, from the Vosgian dialects of the southern Vosges studied by Oscar Bloch in his linguistic atlas of the region.

Bussang Patois, Romance Side:

"Di ton péssa, on fyé byen mœ ké métnan. Li gen ni guégni mi tan d’ergen: lè fomme, on li p’yé di sou par jour, é on n’léz i bévé pwon d’bwèsson; léz homme guégni déj-œt è vin sou, pou lè bwon sèyêre, è on léz i bèyè in wérre dé vin é médi."

transl. In the past, things were done much better than now. People didn’t earn much money: women were paid ten sous a day and weren’t given any drinks; men earned 18 to 20 sous, for good sawmill workers, and were given a glass of wine at noon.

Southern Alemannic Dialect:

"‘Nèier Siasser’ (oder eifàch ‚Nèier‘) ìsch a Spezialität wo ma ìm Spotjohr trìnkt. 's ìsch Triwelmoscht, vu dr letschta Erbschta, wo fàngt à jara. Dr Nèier Siasser 'risst,' dàs heißt: dr Sàft ìsch triab, sprudlig un enthàlt a betsi Àlkohol. A Bsunderheit vum Nèier Siasser ìsch àss d Flascha nìt züe sìn: ma losst ìmmer a Lächla ìm Kapsala, àss dr Gàs vu dr Jarung üssa kàt geh. Tràditionell, trìnkt ma Nèier ìm Oktower, àm an eifach Owaassa, mìt Brot, Spack, Kaas, Nussa."

transl. The "new wine" (or simply "new") is a specialty consumed in autumn. It is a grape must from the latest harvest, just beginning to ferment. The "new wine" develops a yeasty flavor, meaning the juice is cloudy, fizzy, and contains a little alcohol. One particular feature of new wine is that the bottle is not sealed: a small opening is left in the cap to allow the fermentation gas to escape. Traditionally, new wine is drunk in October, at a simple evening meal, with bread, bacon, cheese, and nuts. (Note: Free translation.)

==== Testimony of Michel de Montaigne ====
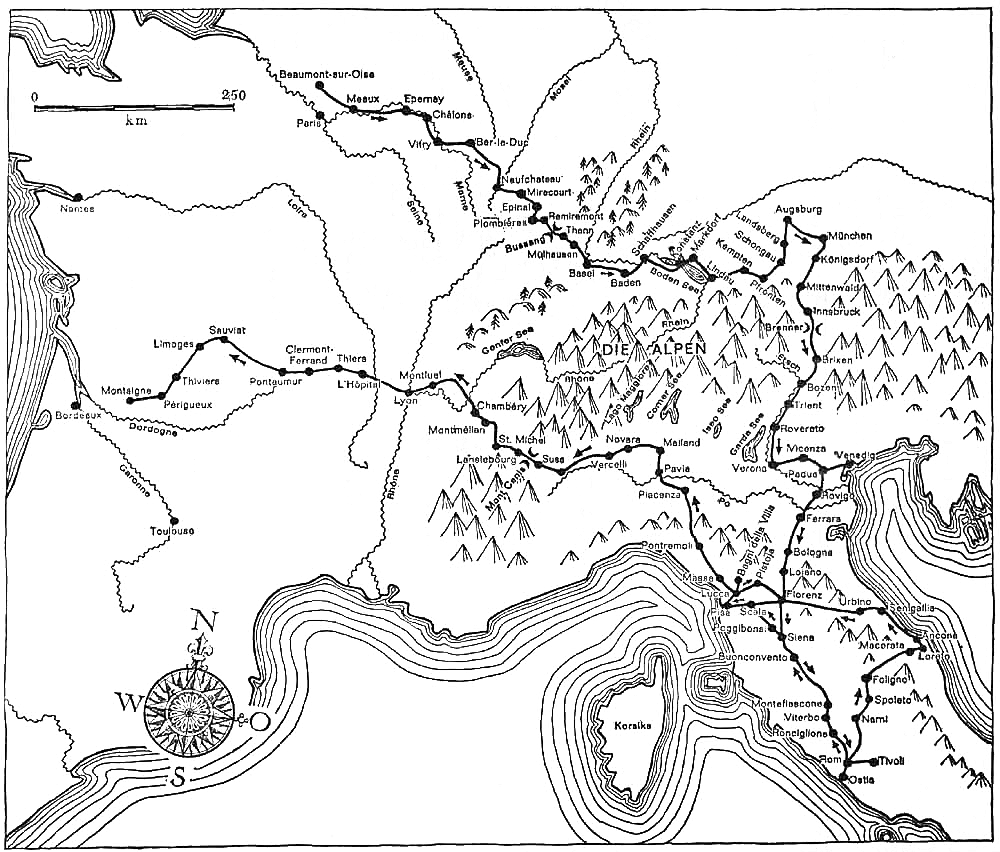
Bussang on the route of Montaigne's journey.

Montaigne stayed in Plombières, "situated on the borders of Lorraine and Germany", from September 16 to September 27, 1580, before continuing to Bussang. He describes his passage through the Bussang Pass in his travel journal as follows:

"From there, we followed for a long time a very beautiful and pleasant valley, running along the Moselle River, and came to dine at Bussang, four leagues away. A small wretched village, the last in the French-speaking region, where Messrs. d'Estissac and de Montaigne, dressed in canvas smocks lent to them, went to see silver mines owned there by the Duke of Lorraine, about two thousand steps into the heart of a mountain. After dinner, we traveled through the mountains, where we were shown, among other things, on inaccessible rocks, the eyries where hawks are caught, costing there only three testons of the local currency, as well as the source of the Moselle. We then came to sup at Thann, (Note: Today Thann in Haut-Rhin, a lock at the exit of the Thur valley.) four leagues away."

The term "Bussang Pass" was not in use during the Middle Ages or the 16th century, so Montaigne could not write it. However, he refers to the gap in the mountain, the inaccessible rocks, and the source of the Moselle, which are located at the current site of the pass, 3 km from the village of Bussang, past the hamlet of Taye.

==== At the Borders of Germany ====
Situated at the intersection of two families of vernacular languages, this region also separates two literary and administrative languages, French and German. This distinction predates both the annexation of Alsace-Lorraine as the Reichsland Elsaß-Lothringen in 1871 and the forcible incorporation of Alsace into the Third Reich in 1940. The terms "allemand" and "Allemaigne" were commonly used in Lorraine's regional French to designate anything non-French Romanic. Thus, the neighboring Alsace, reached by crossing the Vosges passes, was considered German land. The German-speaking Moselle largely corresponds to the former "bailliage d'Allemagne" within the Duchy of Lorraine.

Landmarks such as the "Tête des Allemands" (1,014 m) and the "Col des Allemands" (915 m) above the Bussang Pass to the south underscore the cultural border between the German-speaking and French-speaking worlds, long before the German Empire’s creation in 1871. In the local Vosges dialects of the upper Moselle, Alsace is called "Ollemaine" or "Almê", while the Romanesque Vosgians refer to themselves as "Lôrés" (and later "Lorrains"). Merchants and travelers crossing the Bussang Pass are easily distinguished by their language. Among these, it is logical to count a majority of inhabitants from both sides of the massif—the Thur Valley and the Moselle Valley.

In the 15th and 16th centuries, toll controllers on the Lorraine side reported convoys of German merchants passing every eight days between Colmar and Saint-Nicolas-de-Port. A winemaker from Thann, part of "Germany", claimed to have crossed the Bussang Pass over a hundred times in the late 15th century. These interactions persisted, especially during the 19th century when Alsatians populated the Bussang area, particularly in its worker towns. Bussang had fewer than 200 inhabitants in the 16th century, fewer than 500 in the 17th century, and 1,000 by 1789. The influx of German-speaking populations in the 19th century continued the tradition of cultural contact in this buffer zone along the Vosges ridge.

The Bussang Pass, like nearly the entire Vosges ridge, is not an impermeable border—neither for the movement of people nor for the intermingling of languages. Some place names are bilingual or multilingual if dialectal versions are included. Alsatian words have entered the local patois beyond the Moselle Valley. The most emblematic term may be "marcaire", the Romanic pronunciation of "Malker" (the milker). The marcaireries, with their summer pastures, symbolize the high grazing lands of the Vosges summits, heavily influenced by Swiss-Alemannic culture.

==== Territorial or Political Borders ====
The complex succession of sovereignties on either side of the Bussang Pass over the centuries justifies the summary table provided below. This table does not include periods when both sides of the pass were directly attached to the same political entity.

Variations in legitimacy on either side of the pass throughout history (periods of identical legitimacy are not shown).
The Western Region (Bussang)	Flag /Coat of Arms	is part of:	The Eastern Region (Urbès)	Flag /Coat of Arms	is part of:	From	To
City of the Leuci		Gallia Belgica	City of the Sequani		Gallia Lugdunensis	2nd millennium BC	61
Gallia Belgica, City of the Leuci		Roman Empire	Gallia Lugdunensis, Lands of the Suebi		Roman Empire	61	84
Belgica Prima		Roman Empire	Germania Superior		Roman Empire	84	476
Austrasia		Frankish Kingdoms	Alemannia		Kingdom of the Alamannia	550	845
Lotharingia			Prince-Bishopric of Murbach		Duchy of Swabia	925	1268
Duchy of Lorraine			Prince-Bishopric of Murbach		Duchy of Swabia	973	1274
Duchy of Lorraine		Holy Roman Empire	Landgraviate of Upper Alsace	Haute-Alsace	Holy Roman Empire	1274	1324
Duchy of Lorraine		Holy Roman Empire	Further Austria		Holy Roman Empire	1324	1648
Duchy of Lorraine		Holy Roman Empire	France	Île-de-France	Kingdom of France	1648	1681
Franche-Comté		Kingdom of France	Upper Alsace	Haute-Alsace	Kingdom of France	1681	1704
Duchy of Lorraine		Holy Roman Empire	France	Île-de-France	Kingdom of France	1704	1766
France			German Empire			1871	1918
France			Nazi Germany	NSDAP		1940	1945

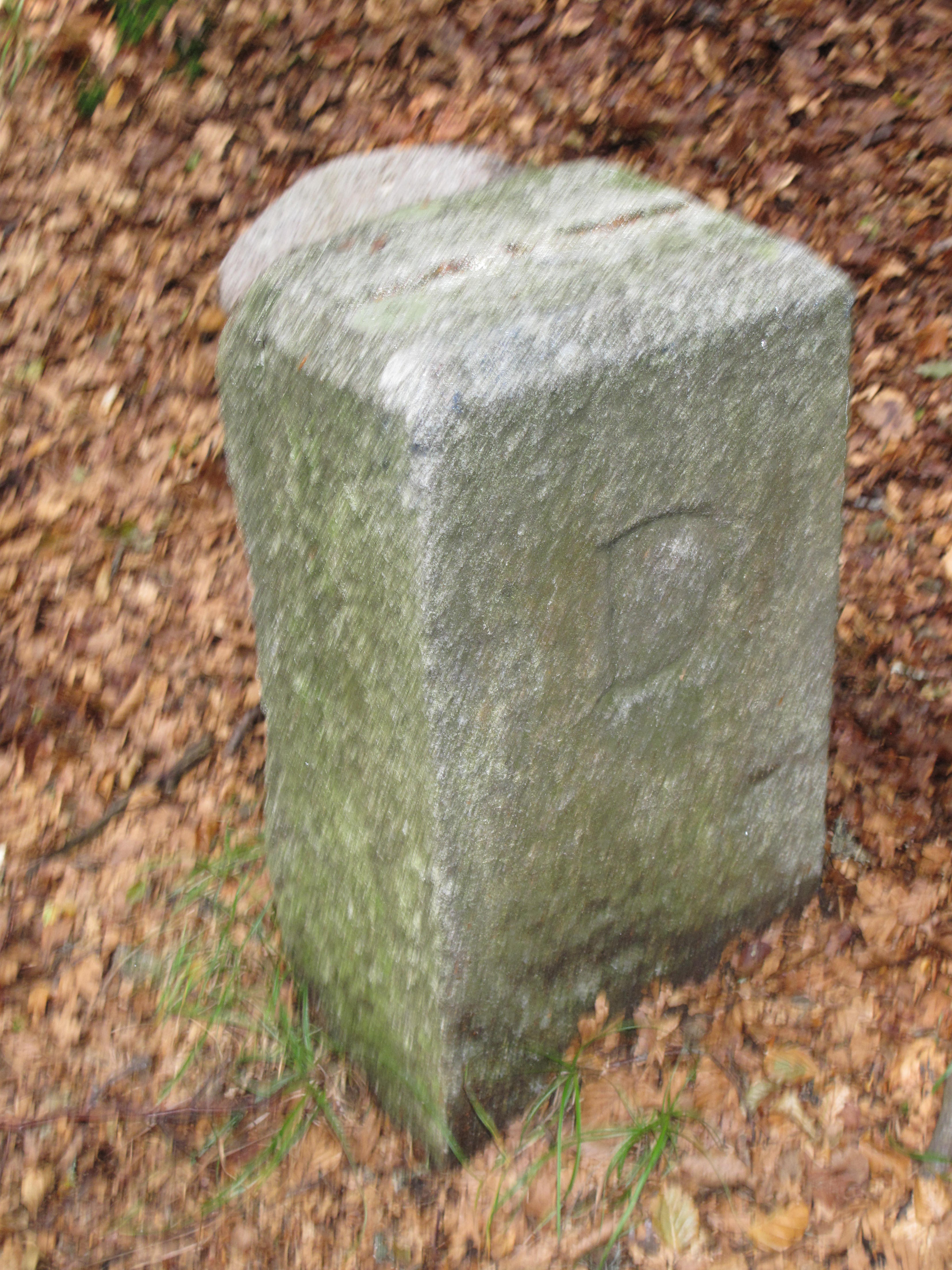
Border marker France – German Empire near the Bussang pass.

In Celtic and Gallo-Roman times, the Vosges Massif served as a territorial boundary, though often a permeable one. Rivers were the main landmarks. The Bussang Pass separated the peoples of Moselle lands from those of the Upper Rhine. The first Germanic peoples, the Suebi, settled in exchange for their assistance to the Sequani Celts against their enemies, the Aedui. To the north of the Alsatian plain were the Triboci. Thus, the early stages of Germanization on the eastern slopes of the Vosges began in antiquity. During the Merovingian era, Alsace quickly separated from Frankish Austrasia and became part of the Kingdom of Alamannia.

The Bussang Pass temporarily lost its status as a border when Middle Francia and then Lotharingia were created, as Alsace was part of this vast kingdom. However, shortly before the partition of the Duchy of Lotharingia into Lower Lorraine and Upper Lorraine in the 10th century, Alsace came under the Duchy of Swabia under Burchard II in 917, thus once again entering the Germanic sphere.

Lotharingia in the 10th century.

By the 10th century, the real neighboring state beyond the Bussang Pass was the Abbey Principality of Murbach, led by a prince-abbot with both spiritual and temporal authority and a seat in the Imperial Diet as a personal representative. Its territory expanded over centuries from its founding in 728 by missionary bishop Saint Fermin, the evangelizer (Note: Saint Firmin also created the Alsatian abbeys of Wissembourg, Marmoutier and Herbitzheim.) of the Alemannic-Swabian region of the Eastern Frankish Kingdom. The Abbot of Murbach held precedence after the primate of Fulda among all imperial abbots. The Murbach scriptorium became one of the centers for the development of Old High German in the Alemannic sphere, alongside Saint Gall and Reichenau.

As a clergyman prohibited from shedding blood, the Abbot of Murbach was represented by a vogt (advocate) responsible for defense and military matters. These were often local lords such as the Counts of Ferrette or the Lords of Bollwiller. With the creation of the Landgraviate of Upper Alsace, which held authority over the Abbey Principality of Murbach despite its near-total autonomy, the Bussang Pass became an entry point into Sundgau and later Further Austria under Habsburg rule. Thus, Austria, through the Archduke, reached the southern Vosges passes.

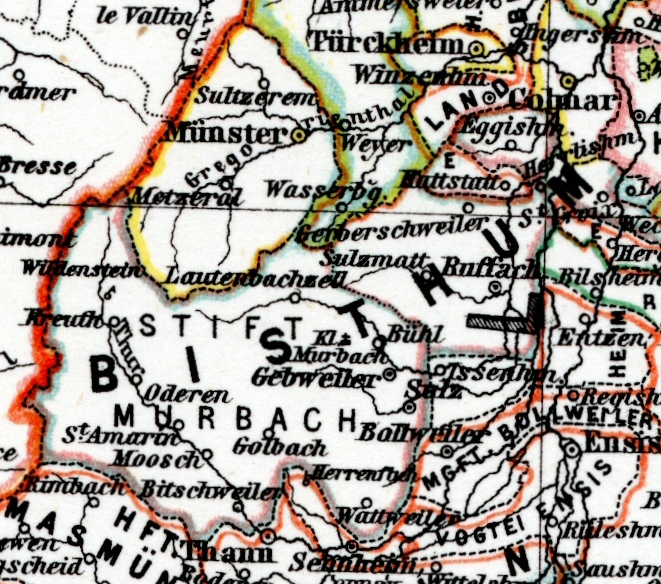
Territory of the abbey principality of Murbach.

Just a few kilometers away, the Bussang Pass might have been a mere crossing point between the lands of the Insigne Chapter of Remiremont on one side and the ridgelands under the Duke of Lorraine on the other. The villages of Oderen, Kruth, and part of Fellering belonged to the canonesses of Remiremont. In 973, Charlemagne granted the Chapter of Murbach much of his holdings in Fellering. The Oderen Pass, slightly north of the Bussang Pass, logically served as a route to the upper Thur Valley. In 1537, the Prince-Abbot of Murbach Abbey became the feudal lord of the entire upper Thur Valley after acquiring lands not previously donated by Charlemagne. For around seven centuries, the Bussang Pass remained the frontier between the Duchy of Lorraine and Upper Alsace. When the Abbey Principality of Murbach and Upper Alsace, under Habsburg authority, was annexed by France in 1648, the Bussang Pass marked the border between an independent Lorraine duchy and an increasingly powerful French kingdom.

Part of the lands under surséance, the upper Moselle Valley also experienced a period under the jurisdiction of Franche-Comté and thus the Kingdom of France for 23 years before being returned to the Duke of Lorraine by the Treaty of Besançon on August 25, 1704. Consequently, the Bussang Pass ceased to be a national border, becoming a regional one between Alsace and Franche-Comté. A decree dated July 16, 1681, proclaimed “the Reunion of the Vaux de Longchamps and Ramonchamps to the sovereignty and county of Burgundy,” despite protests from the mayors of annexed communes. The pass was located in the ban of Ramonchamp at the time. The issue of the lands under surséance ended with the retrocession of the bans of Ramonchamp and Longchamp to the Duchy of Lorraine in 1704. Even after Lorraine's annexation to France half a century later, the upper Moselle remained part of Lorraine.

This status as a territorial boundary disappeared in 1766 when ducal Lorraine was annexed to France. A century later, the pass became a state border between France and the newly created German Empire in 1871. In 1918, it no longer divided two states but merely two departments. During World War II, the Third Reich not only occupied Alsace-Lorraine but reintegrated it into the Reich. Since the end of World War II, the Bussang Pass has ceased to be a border between the two states.

===== Diocesan Boundaries =====
Spiritually, the Bussang Pass also served for centuries as a boundary between two ancient and vast dioceses, distinct from the imperial episcopal principalities: Toul, under the ecclesiastical province or archdiocese of Trier, and Basel. Beyond the pass into Alsace, travelers entered the deanery or rural chapter of Mazopolitanum in the Diocese of Basel, centered in Masevaux. It was only during the French Revolution, specifically in 1790, that the Diocese of Basel's French territories in Alsace were incorporated into the new constitutional Diocese of Haut-Rhin. On the Lorraine side, the ecclesiastical Pouillé of Toul from 1402 detailed the origins and divisions of “one of the largest dioceses of ancient Gaul,” with six archdeaconries encompassing 680 parishes. The Toul boundary at the Bussang Pass aligned with the frontier of the ancient Leuci territory (Civitas Leuquorum) under the Trier metropolis. This explains why Bussang, 265 km from Trier but only 65 km from Basel, belonged to Toul. Until the Ancien Régime, the Bishop of Toul retained the honorary title of Leuchorum episcopus.

The archdeaconries emerged around the middle of the 10th century, and the region of Bussang, formerly an annex of Saint-Maurice-sur-Moselle, was part of the Vosges archdeaconry and the deanery of Remiremont, which the Pouillé describes briefly as follows:

"The Deanery of Remiremont extends into the Vosges Mountains and is separated by these Mountains from Alsace to the East. To the South, it borders the Diocese of Besançon, and to the West and North, it is bounded by the Deanery of Épinal. The Moselle River divides it in two, from its source in Bussans, within the parish of Saint Maurice, to below Arches, which is the last parish of this Deanery toward Épinal."

The first modifications came with Pope Pius VI’s bull Ad univeram agri on November 19, 1777, which established the Dioceses of Nancy-Toul and Saint-Dié, both dependent on the ecclesiastical province of Besançon from 1823 onward. Strasbourg’s Diocese, elevated to an archdiocese by John Paul II in 1988, also fell under Besançon. The Treaty of Campo Formio in 1797 ended the Franco-Austrian War, bringing Trier and the Rhine’s left bank under French administration during the Napoleonic period. The 1823 restructuring severed the historical ties between Lorraine dioceses and Trier after over 1,100 years. The diocesan territories retained a cross-border character, each stemming from a former episcopal principality led by a prince-bishop of the Holy Roman Empire. Toul belonged to the Three Bishoprics, while Basel split between the Swiss Confederation and an episcopal see extending to the Belfort Gap. The Vosges' eastern slope fell under a Swiss episcopal territory, while the western façade encompassed dioceses under the German Trier archdiocese. Both ancient episcopal seats were thus located in German-speaking lands.

Diocese on the Lorraine Side	Coat of Arms	Diocese on the Alsace Side	Coat of Arms	From	To
Diocese of Toul		Diocese of Basel		4th century	1777
Diocese of Saint-Dié		Diocese of Basel		1777	1790
Diocese of Saint-Dié		Diocese of Upper Rhine		1790	1801
Diocese of Nancy-Toul		Diocese of Strasbourg		1801	1823
Diocese of Saint-Dié		Diocese of Strasbourg		1823	ongoing

==== Boundaries of Woodland Slopes and Pastures ====
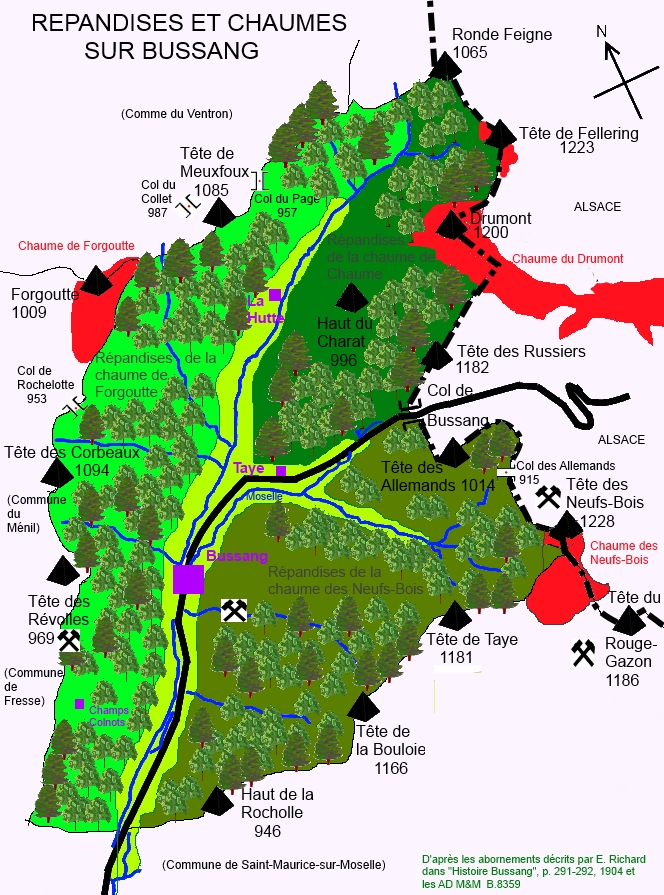
Sketch representing the summer pasture areas of Bussang.

The residents of Bussang had grazing rights on the woodland slopes of the high pastures. The term woodland slopes refers to the wooded hillsides below the high-altitude pastures used by dairy farmers (marcaires). These slopes were considered part of the pastures, supplying firewood for cheese production and repairs to chalets. The 1712 boundary description outlines the limits as follows:

- The slopes behind the Hutte, from Taye to the pass, formed the woodland slopes of Drumont, 1,200 meters.
- The slopes behind Taye, from Lamerey to the pass, were the woodland slopes of Neuf-Bois, 1,228 meters.
- The Champs-Colnots to the area behind the Hutte belonged to the woodland slopes of Forgoutte, 1,008 meters.

=== Developments ===
==== History of the Roadway ====
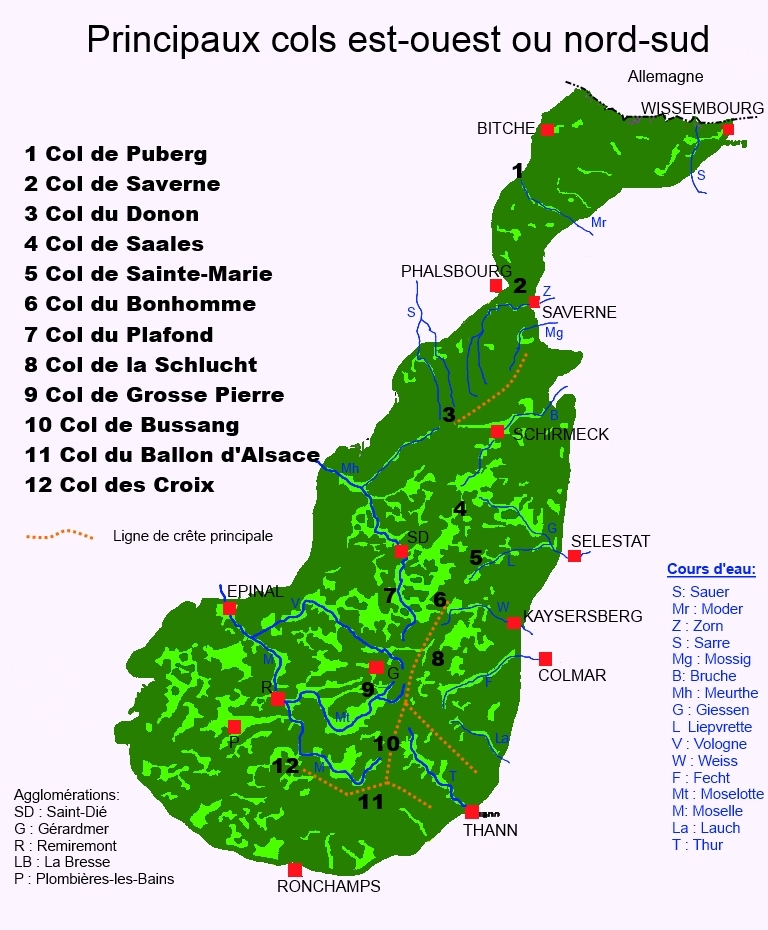
Location map of the main passes in the Vosges.

The Bussang Pass is located on Route Nationale 66 (RN 66), previously Route Royale 66 and formerly Route Impériale 84. The old Roman road route remained in use until the 17th century. The current road, established in 1724–1725, follows the valley floor after marshy areas bypassed by the Roman road were drained. Twenty years later, construction began on a new road from Saint-Maurice-sur-Moselle to Giromagny, passing through what would become the Col du Ballon d'Alsace. This project, completed over 18 years, opened up the upper Moselle valley and improved transit to Alsace via Thann or Belfort. In 1753, authorities decided to build this new road over the Ballon d'Alsace to facilitate the transport of heavy goods. Floating timber down the Moselle was insufficiently profitable, even with minor river improvements, particularly for marine timber destined for Normandy's shipyards.

The intendant repeatedly reminded timber exporters from Ramonchamp that dragging logs along the roadway was forbidden as it caused significant damage. Before the diversion to Giromagny after Saint-Maurice-sur-Moselle, timber transit to Alsace could only occur via the Col de Bussang. This operation boosted cross-border trade between Lorraine and Upper Alsace, as timber was felled on the Lorraine side and processed in Masevaux, Oberbruck, or Blanc Murger (Bellefontaine).

Originally, the royal and national road connected Bar-le-Duc in Meuse (Lorraine) to Basel (Switzerland), corresponding to the Ancien Régime's commercial route. However, the national road's path does not always align with the Roman route. The Meuse section was downgraded to departmental road 966 in the 1970s (or partially to today's Route Nationale 135) from Bar-le-Duc to Ligny-en-Barrois. The Vosges segment of RN 66 to Épinal was reclassified as departmental road 166, with sections in Haut-Rhin also reclassified as departmental roads. Currently, RN 66 links Remiremont to Mulhouse and corresponds to European Route 512.

To facilitate crossing the pass, particularly for heavy artillery, a tunnel was built in 1848 under the direction of Jean-Baptiste Huot, an engineer for public works and future mayor of Épinal (1874–1881). The tunnel's total length was 251 meters, with 60% on the Lorraine side. After the annexation of Alsace-Lorraine in 1870, a customs office was established at the tunnel's entrance, and a first-aid post was added by the Touring Club before World War I. Many old postcards depict both sides of the tunnel with customs officers. On these postcards, one can easily recognize the old road tracing the pass, which, on the Lorraine side, bypassed the tunnel and ascended slightly higher. The tunnel was dynamited in 1944 and was never rebuilt.

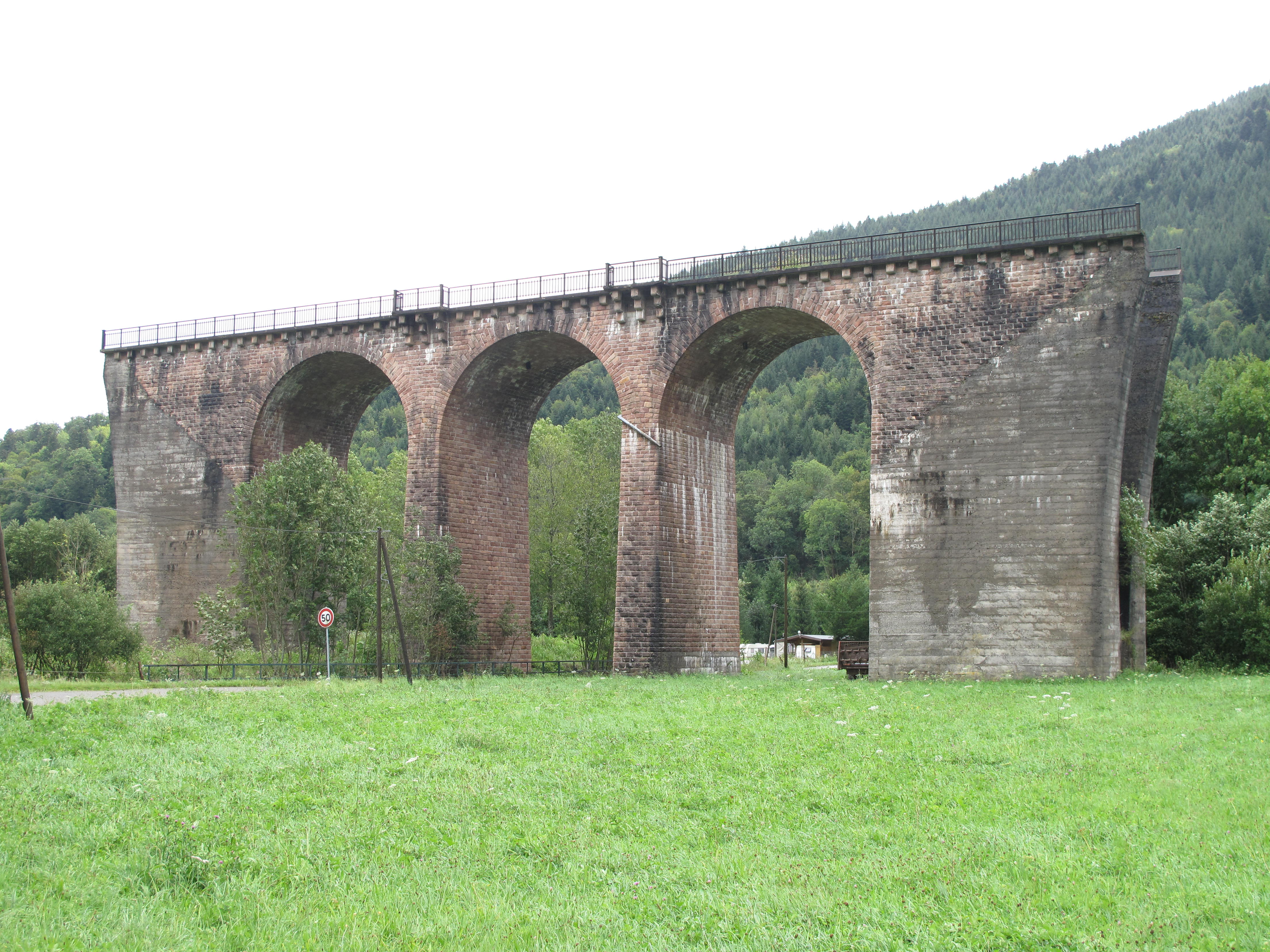
Unfinished railway bridge in Urbès for the Bussang-Urbès line.

==== Rail Tunnel Project ====
Compared to the higher-altitude Swiss Alps, the Vosges mountains have historically been bypassed. Only one long rail tunnel, Sainte-Marie-aux-Mines (6,950 meters), later converted for road use, crosses the massif. It opened to vehicles in 1976 after initially serving rail traffic. The Col de Sainte-Marie was another passage between Lorraine and Alsace, accessible via the Meurthe Valley and often the Col du Bonhomme. (Note: As a reminder, the major ancestral passages coming from the west towards Alsace were the Col de Saverne, the Col du Donon, the Col du Bonhomme and the Col de Bussang. Secondary passes rather connected on a local scale two slopes in frequent relation: Col de Sainte-Marie, Col de Bramont, Col d'Oderen, Col de Saales, Col du Calvaire, Col du Ballon d'Alsace, Col des Charbonniers.)

The historic Moselle route, with the Col de Bussang as its sole natural obstacle before reaching Basel, Switzerland, could have included a rail tunnel connecting the Benelux countries to Italy. A new 13.7-kilometer line was proposed from Bussang station to Fellering station. The Urbès–Saint-Maurice-sur-Moselle tunnel, known as the Bussang Tunnel, would have spanned 8,287 meters, making it the longest underground structure in France in the mid-20th century.

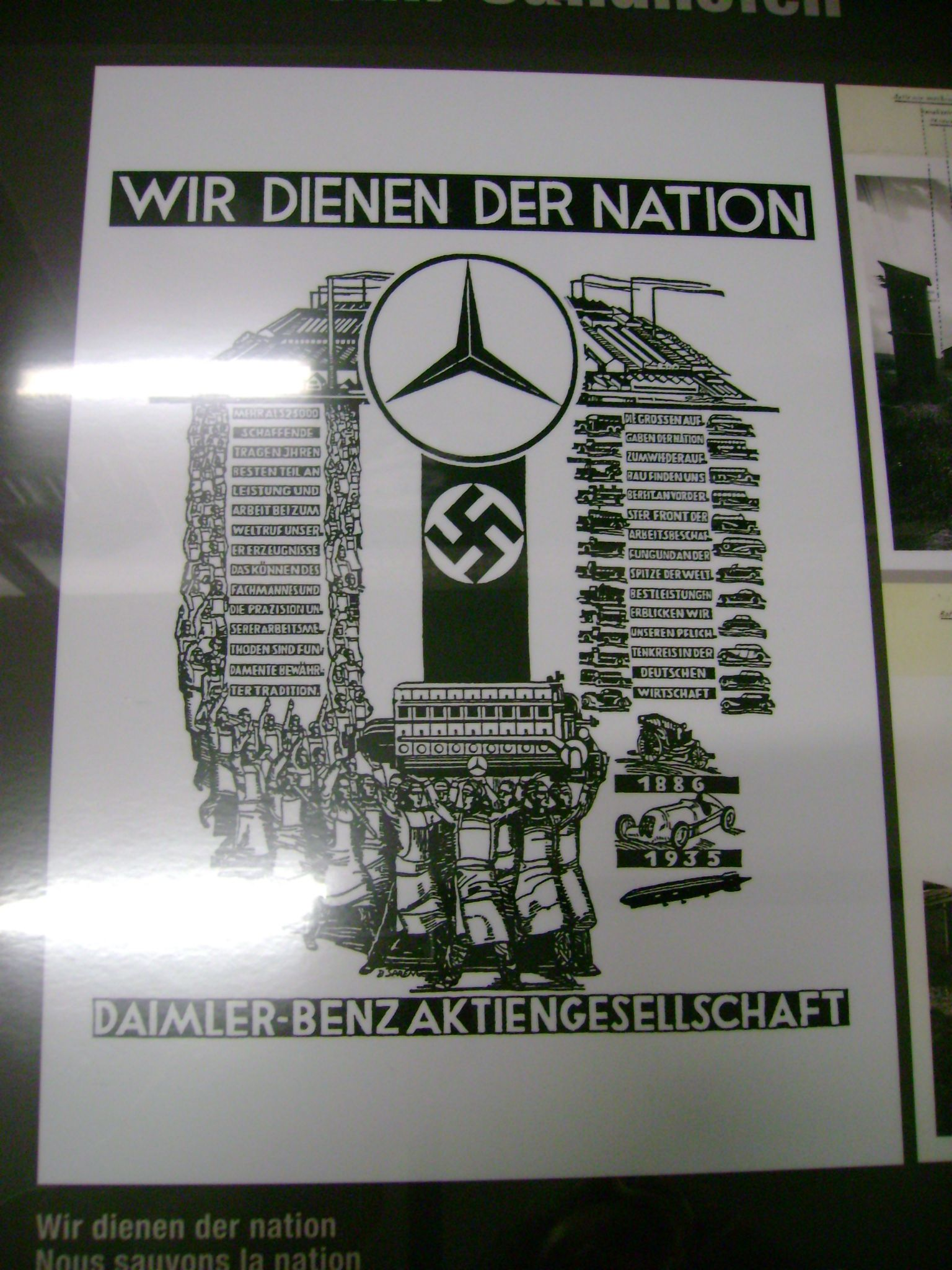
War effort: Daimler-Benz and deportation.

Approved on July 11, 1870, construction was canceled due to the Franco-Prussian War and Alsace's annexation by the German Empire. Excavation began in 1932, but costs rapidly escalated amid worsening economic and political conditions, leading to the drilling company's bankruptcy in 1935. Most engineering structures on the Alsace side were completed, and nearly four kilometers of the tunnel were excavated, about half of its planned length on the Alsace side. The Vosges side lagged, a delay that ultimately proved advantageous.

Local frustration grew as the project's revival dragged on. World War II halted construction again. In 1943, the Alsace-side tunnel section was repurposed as a labor camp, and annexed to the Natzweiler-Struthof concentration camp, to produce aircraft engine components for Daimler-Benz. The deportees, primarily Jews, came from Dachau or Struthof camps and were mostly Russian and Polish, with some Germans and Luxembourgers.

Today, there are numerous routes, via a great number of passes (one example being the Donon Pass), available for crossing between Lorraine and Alsace by road.

== Sporting Activities ==
=== Hiking ===
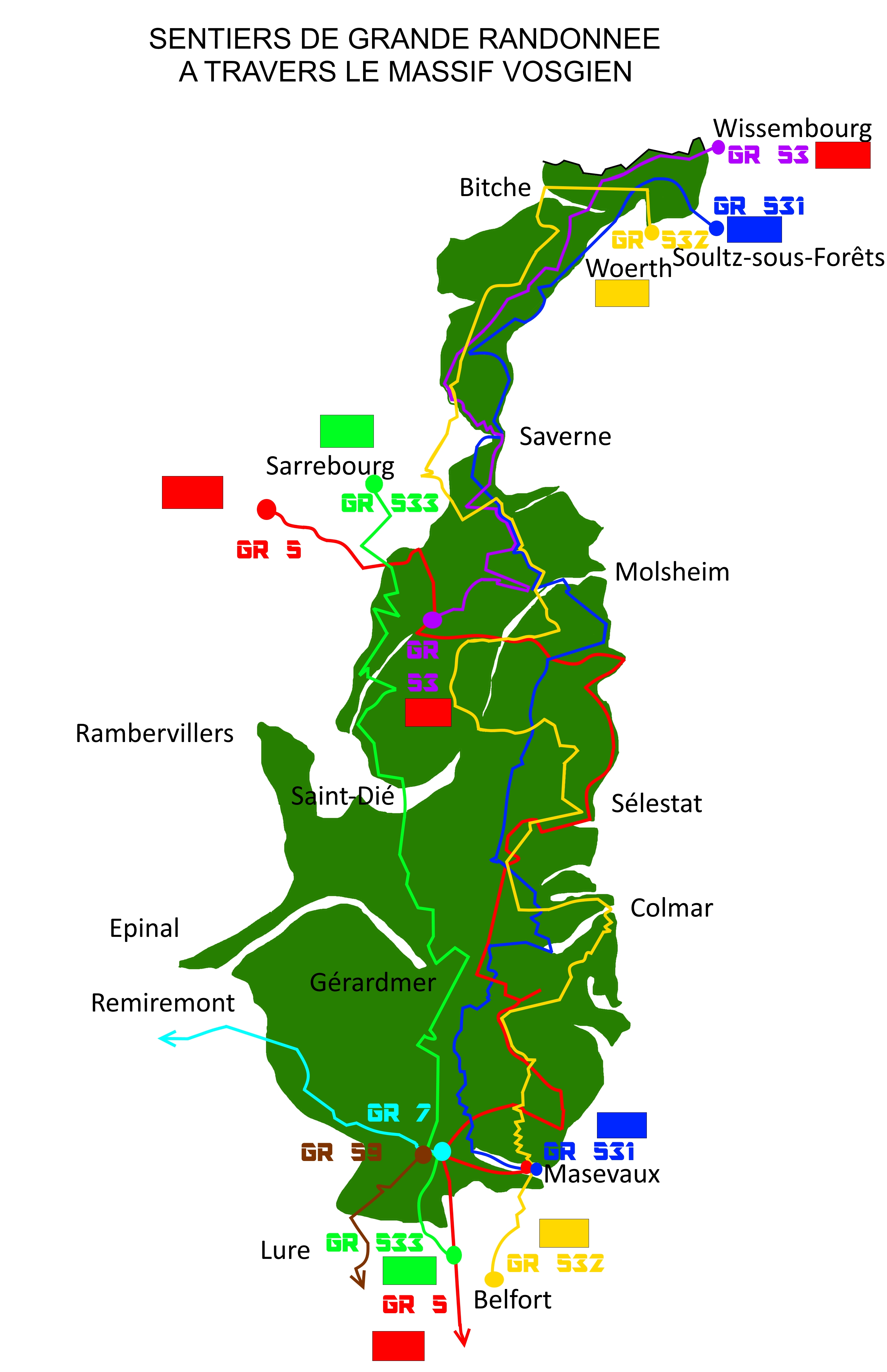
Sections of the long hikes in the Vosges including the GR 531 via the Bussang pass.

The Bussang Pass is not among the tourist passes of the Vosges mountains. Located in the Ballons des Vosges Regional Natural Park, it is nonetheless included in the park's tourist brochures and in all projects to enhance the southern area of the Vosges Massif. Due to its relatively confined position between two summits, the pass primarily serves as a west-to-east road traffic corridor. Consequently, hiking trails are predominantly oriented along a north–south axis, between the Oderen Pass and the Perches Pass, i.e., between the Drumont Massif and the Tête des Perches. (Note: The IGN TOP 25 CV hiking map which corresponds to this sector is no. 3619OT Bussang-La Bresse.) As a result, the Bussang Pass functions more as a waypoint between better-equipped sites. However, the parking area below the Moselle source allows for shorter circuits compared to the direct route of the long-distance hiking trail passing straight through it.

Situated along a ridge line, the Bussang Pass lies on the route of the GR 531 long-distance hiking trail, marked by the Vosges Club (CV) with a blue rectangle. The GR 531 section near Bussang passes through the following sites:

- Drumont farm-inn (1,200 m);
- Bussang Pass (727 m);
- Saint-Hubert chalet (CV);
- Tête du Rouge Gazon farm-inn (1,086 m);
- Perches Pass (1,071 m).

At the Perches Pass, it intersects with the GR 5 trail, which connects the North Sea to the Mediterranean, identified by the Vosges Club's red rectangle marker. From the pass, it's only an 8 km trek to reach this junction of two long-distance trails. Two alternative GR 531 trails also pass through the Bussang Pass: the southern section heading toward Tête du Rouge Gazon via the Col des Allemands and another southern route looping through Séchenat, the Sotré Kiosk, and Tête de Bouloie (1,166 m), marked with a yellow disc.

Additionally, the Moselle Valley can be linked to the Charbonniers Valley by a trail crossing the Taye Heights, marked with a red rectangle. From the Bussang Pass, one can also hike to Urbès via a trail marked with a yellow rectangle, passing by the pass quarry and the Gustiberg grazing area (1,005 m). Hiking along long-distance trails requires shelters, lodges, and refuges at regular intervals to plan stages based on the daily distance covered. This is particularly true when nearby towns remain relatively distant for hikers wishing to stick to their trails.

Beyond the seven shelters near the pass, (Note: Shelters of Saint-Hubert, Crêtes, Conche, Evraux, Petite Montagne, Plain de Repos Lodge, Pont Martin Lodge.) organizations such as the Vosges Club, the Nature Friends Tourism Union, and the regional park provide refuges or lodges, such as the Tête des Perches Refuge, Séchenat Refuge, Gazon Vert Refuge, and Haut Mahrel Refuge on the Alsace side of the pass. Hikers can also find dormitories in the farmlands of nearby summits: Drumont, Gustiberg, and Rouge Gazon. The closest campsite to the pass is located on the Alsace side, in Urbès. (Note: Camping Benelux Basel is located at the foot of the pass next to a paraglider landing area.)

Observation of the hiking circuits reveals a focus on exploring an untamed natural environment, as well as the flora and fauna of the mid-mountain region, including some subalpine species. Since the GR 531 follows the summit ridge line, hikers in this area primarily discover the grassy plateaus or meadows of the Vosges Massif, where pastoral summer activities are still visible, albeit now nearly relics following the necessary transformation of alpine farms into tourist farm inns. (Note: The summer lawns that have been abandoned or are still in use are the Neufs-Bois lawn, the Fellering lawn, the Petit Gazon, the Gazon Vert, the Rouge Gazon, the Drumont and the Gustiberg.) The lack of over-tourism fosters a tranquil hiking experience.

=== Cycling ===
According to the French Cycling Federation’s mountain biking section, the Bussang Pass is part of two circuits in the Hautes-Vosges VTT-FFC area, which includes Bussang, Saint-Maurice-sur-Moselle, and Ventron:

- Circuit No. 8, named “Tour de la Hutte,” is 21.5 km long with a 335 m elevation gain. It starts at the Étang des Sources below the pass on the Lorraine side.
- Circuit No. 9, called “La Bouloie – Séchenat,” covers 17 km with a 350 m elevation gain, starting at the local tourism office.

Various cycling tourism websites, both associative and private, include the Bussang Pass in their route suggestions, with different starting points of varying distances. For example, starting from Le Thillot, the circuit is 13.5 km with a 246 m elevation gain, averaging a 1.82% incline with a peak of 4.6%. On the Alsace side, starting from Urbès, the climb is steeper, covering 6.5 km with a 276 m elevation gain and an average incline of 4.2%. However, for road cycling, the only option is to cross the pass from west to east; this limits opportunities unless one uses the numerous asphalted forest roads in the area.

==== Tour de France 2005 ====
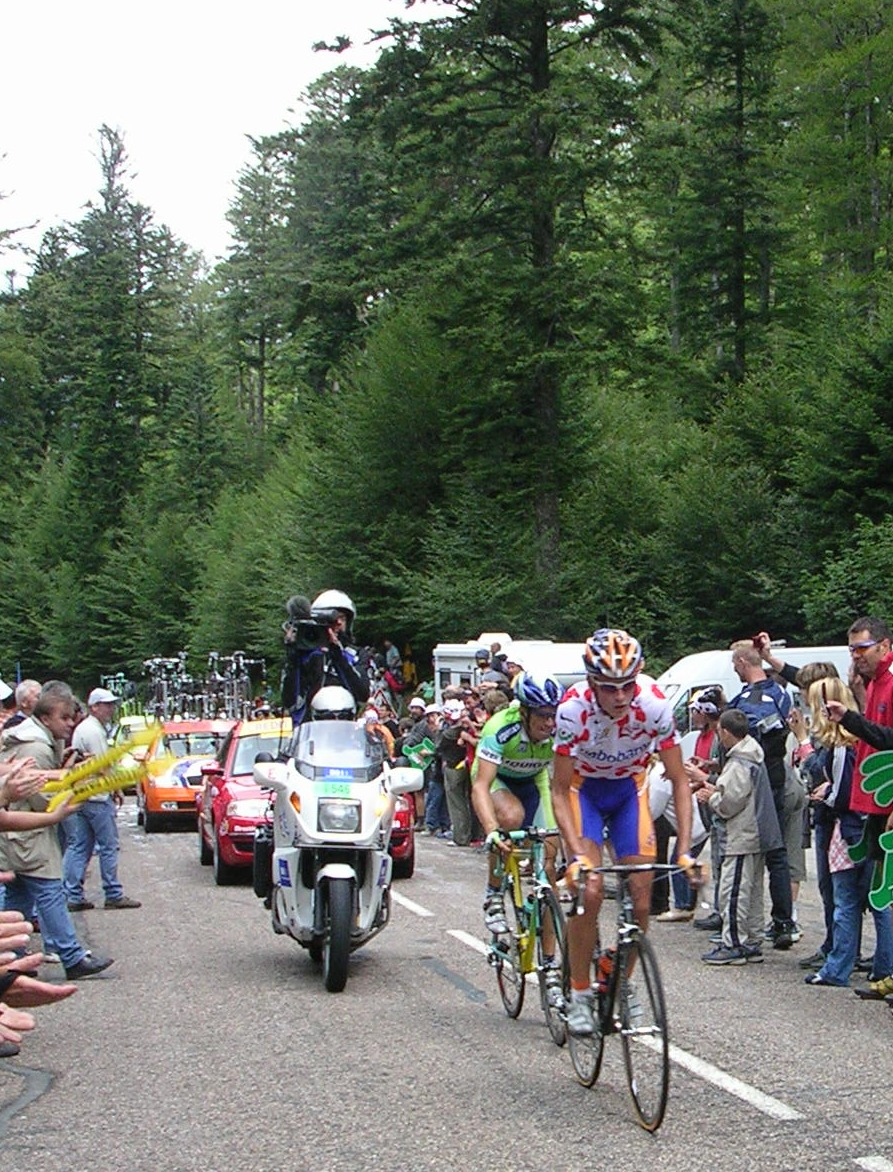
Michael Rasmussen leads Dario Cioni during stage 9 of the 2005 Tour de France.

The Bussang Pass appeared only once on the Tour de France route. It was categorized as a 3rd-category climb during the 9th stage of the 2005 Tour, connecting Gérardmer to Mulhouse. Michael Rasmussen crossed the pass first, ahead of Dario Cioni and Christophe Moreau, solidifying his polka dot jersey as the best climber.

==== Motorcycling ====
The Bussang Pass is also included in various motorcycle circuits and treks in Alsace and the Vosges Massif. The former pass hotel, whose activity had been declining, was purchased and converted into the “Moto-Hotel du Col de Bussang” by a Dutch couple in the 1990s. It specializes in accommodating European motorcyclists from spring to autumn, offering secure storage for bikes and adapted rooms.

The proposed circuits extend beyond the mountainous massif with its winding roads, which are popular with motorcyclists. Riders typically cross the Vosges Massif at two different passes, combining secondary forest roads on the Lorraine side with the plains and vineyards of Alsace's Wine Route on the eastern side. Visitors mainly come from Benelux and neighboring German-speaking countries, Germany and Switzerland. Specialized Dutch- and German-language magazines often feature circuits with evocative titles such as “Vosges Passes,” “From the Black Forest to the Vosges,” or “Alsace Vineyards and Vosges Massif.” The concept revolves around discovering contrasting landscapes offering cultural and topographical diversity.

=== Paragliding and Aeromodelling ===
The paragliding and hang-gliding sites directly accessible from the Bussang Pass via a forest or local road are Gustiberg on the Alsace side (Note: Description sheet from the official FFVL website, “Gustiberg Site”, no. 68D002A: “Access: from Urbès towards Bussang, 100 m before the Bussang pass turn right towards the quarry then forest path to the paragliding parking lot, 15 min on foot passing in front of the farm inn, turn right in front of the farm then follow the small path straight ahead. Description: dangerous in winds of more than 20 km/h from the east, north-east and south-west.”) and Drumont on the Lorraine side. (Note: Description sheet from the official FFVL website, “Site Petit Drumont,” no. 68D004A: “Description: very steep easy takeoff. Rollers under the Gustiberg ridge in south-easterly winds. Landing prohibited in the valley that opens to the east of the takeoff, despite the beautiful cows there. Venturi at the bottom of the Urbès valley towards the Bussang pass. Presence of a site for aeromodelers between the Delta site and the paraglider site.”)

The pass's aerodynamic and topographic configuration creates significant aerial constraints due to occasionally unfavorable east or northeast winds and the Venturi effect over the pass toward Urbès. At the Drumont site, the aeromodelling launch area is situated between the take-off zones for paragliders and hang-gliders. This proximity requires increased vigilance during peak activity periods.

The Bussang Pass is located within the Electronic Warfare Polygon (PGE), a military exercise zone used by the French Army and NATO. Free flight activities in this area are therefore subject to strict regulations regarding flight levels. (Note: In the Electronic Warfare Polygon, the flight level is set at 3,425 m or FL 115 during weekends and holidays. During military maneuvers and exercises on weekdays from Monday to Friday until 4 p.m., it passes 1,890 m or 2,450 m.)

== See also ==
=== External links ===
- "Carte des sites naturels, réserves et parcs régionaux de Lorraine" [Map of natural sites, reserves and regional parks in Lorraine]. carmen.developpement-durable.gouv.fr (in French).

== Bibliography ==
=== Linguistic aspects ===
- Bischoff, Georges; Huck, Dominique; Blanchet, Philippe (2006). "Minorations, Minorisations, Minorités" [Minorations, Minorizations, Minorities]. Une minorité virtuelle. Être Welsche en Alsace dans les coulisses du Siècle d'Or (1477-1618) [A virtual minority. Being Welsche in Alsace behind the scenes of the Golden Age (1477-1618)] (in French). Vol. 10. Cahiers de Sociolinguistique. pp. 87–105. doi:10.3917/csl.0501.0087.
- Bloch, Oscar (1915). Lexique français-patois des Vosges méridionales [French-patois lexicon of the southern Vosges] (in French). Paris: éd. H. Champion.
- Bloch, Oscar (1917a). Les parlers des Vosges méridionales [The dialects of the southern Vosges] (in French). Paris: éd. H. Champion.
- Bloch, Oscar (1917b). Atlas linguistique des Vosges méridionales [Linguistic Atlas of the Southern Vosges] (in French). Paris: éd. H. Champion.
- Haubrichs, Wolfgang (2007). "L'espace physique, l'histoire, la langue. L'élaboration des zones de contact et des frontières linguistiques entre Romania et Germania, entre la Suisse et le Luxembourg" [Physical space, history, language. The development of contact zones and linguistic borders between Romania and Germania, between Switzerland and Luxembourg]. Publications de la Sorbonne (in French). 37. Paris: 167–191.
- Hudlett, Albert (2001). Synopsis géolinguistique, Continuum des parlers alémaniques et franciques d'Alsace et de Moselle germanophone [Geolinguistic synopsis, Continuum of Alemannic and Frankish dialects of Alsace and German-speaking Moselle] (in French). Strasbourg: Hirlé. p. 271. ISBN 2-910048-90-X.
- König, Werner (1978). dtv-Atlas zur deutschen Sprache: Tafeln und Texte mit Mundartkarten [dtv-Atlas of the German Language: Tables and Texts with Dialect Cards] (in German). Munich: Deutscher Taschenbuchverlag. p. 248. ISBN 3-423-03025-9.

=== History ===
- Benoît, François (1711). Pouillié ecclésiastique et civil du diocèse de Toul [Ecclesiastical and civil Pouillié of the diocese of Toul] (in French). Vol. 2. Toul: Louis & Étienne Rolin. p. 404.
- Choppin, Henri (1875). Campagne de Turenne en Alsace, 1674-1675: D'après des documents inédits [Turenne's campaign in Alsace, 1674-1675: According to unpublished documents] (in French). Paris: J. Dumaine.
- Desgouttes, Henri-Zacharie (1894). Tableau statistique du département des Vosges [Statistical table of the Vosges department] (in French). Paris: Le Clere, Heinrichs, Treuttel et Wurtz.
- du Fresnel, Henri Victor Dollin (1804). Un régiment à travers l'histoire, le 76e, ex-1er léger [A regiment throughout history, the 76th, ex-1st light] (in French). Paris: Flammarion. pp. 327–328.
- Fournier, Alban (1994). Les Vosges du Donon au Ballon d'Alsace [The Vosges from Donon to the Ballon d’Alsace] (in French). Preface by Albert Ronsin. Raon-l’Etape: Louis Geisler. p. 539. ISBN 978-2902912131.
- Garnier, Emmanuel (2004). Terre de conquêtes: La forêt vosgienne sous l'Ancien Régime [Land of conquests: The Vosges forest under the Ancien Régime] (in French). Paris: Fayard. p. 620. ISBN 2-213-61783-X.
- Fray, Jean-Luc (2006). Villes et bourgs de Lorraine: réseaux urbains et centralité au Moyen Âge [Towns and villages of Lorraine: urban networks and centrality in the Middle Ages] (in French). Clermont-Ferrand: Presses Universitaires Blaise Pascal. p. 551. ISBN 2845162383.
- Georgel, Marc (1966). Les noms de lieux-dits de l'arrondissement de Remiremont (Vosges): Étude de caractérisation toponymique [Place names in the district of Remiremont (Vosges): Toponymic characterization study] (in French). Saint-Dié: Loos. p. 399.
- Germonville, Jean-Paul; Riboux, Martine; Jeanpierre, Brigitte (1995). Vallée de la Haute-Moselle et Ballon d'Alsace, autour du Thillot, entre le col de Bussang, Gérardmer et Remiremont [Upper Moselle Valley and Ballon d'Alsace, around Thillot, between the Bussang pass, Gérardmer and Remiremont] (in French). Metz: Casterman Serpenoise. p. 80. ISBN 2-203-61504-4.
- Heider, Christine (2004). Entre France et Allemagne: Thann, une ville de Haute-Alsace sous la domination des Habsbourg (1324-1648) [Between France and Germany: Thann, a town in Upper Alsace under the domination of the Habsburgs (1324-1648)] (in French). Strasbourg: BNU. p. 382. ISBN 978-0375726262.
- Jouve, Louis (1888). Bussang (in French). Vol. 1. Épinal: Imprimerie Vve H. Mougin. p. 123.
- Kinder, Hermann; Hilgemann, Werner (1979). DTV-Atlas zur deutschen Geschichte, Karten und chronologischer Abriss: Von den Anfängen bis zur französischen Revolution [DTV Atlas of German History, Maps and Chronological Outline: From the Beginnings to the French Revolution] (in German). Vol. 1. Munich: Deutscher Taschenbuchverlag GmbH. p. 287. ISBN 3-423-03001-1.
- Kinder, Hermann; Hilgemann, Werner (1980). DTV-Atlas zur deutschen Geschichte, Karten und chronologischer Abriss: Von der Französischen Revolution bis zur Gegenwart [DTV Atlas of German History, Maps and Chronological Outline: From the French Revolution to the Present] (in German). Vol. 2. Munich: Deutscher Taschenbuchverlag GmbH. p. 342. ISBN 3-423-03002-X.
- Legrand-Girarde, Émile (1910). Turenne en Alsace : Campagne de 1674-1675 [Turenne en Alsace: Campaign of 1674-1675] (in French). Paris: Berger-Levrault et Cie. p. 160.
- Loux, René (1976). La Réalité historique de l'Alsace [The Réalité historique de l'Alsace] (in French). Paris: La Pensée universelle. p. 502.
- Parisse, Michel (1980). Remiremont, l'abbaye et la ville: actes des journées d'études vosgiennes [Remiremont, l'abbaye et la ville: actes des journées d'études vosgiennes] (in French). Service des Publications de l'Université de Nancy II. p. 369. ISBN 9782864800040.
- Parisse, Michel (1990). Austrasie, Lotharingie, Lorraine: L'époque médiévale [Austrasia, Lotharingia, Lorraine: The medieval period] (in French). Nancy: Presses Universitaires de Nancy. p. 253. ISBN 2864803437.
- Parisse, Michel (2008). Allemagne et Empire au Moyen Âge (400-1510) [Germany and Empire in the Middle Ages (400-1510)] (in French). Nancy: Hachette Education. p. 336. ISBN 978-2-01-145974-9.
- Parisse, Michel (2005). Histoire de Lorraine [History of Lorraine] (in French). Rennes: Editions Ouest-France. ISBN 2-7373-3628-7.
- Parmentier, Raphaël (2004). Bussang: Histoire d'un col [Bussang: History of a pass] (in French). Vesoul: Les Éditions de Franche-Comté. p. 96. ISBN 978-2-915402-50-6.
- Parmentier, Raphaël (2007). Urbès - St Maurice: Le souterrain du Col de Bussang [Urbès - St Maurice: The Col de Bussang underground] (in French). Vesoul: Les éditions de Franche-Comté. p. 127. ISBN 978-2-915402-75-9.
- Ploetz, Karl Julius (1986). Der große PLOETZ Auszug aus der Geschichte [The great PLOETZ excerpt from the story] (in German). Freiburg-Würzburg: Verlag Ploetz. p. 1720. ISBN 3-87640-050-3.
- Poull, Georges (1985). Les Vosges [The Vosges] (in French). Paris: France-Empire. ISBN 2-7048-0430-3.
- Werner, Karl-Ferdinand (1984). Les origines, t. I [Origins, Vol. I] (in French). Paris: Fayard. p. 540. ISBN 2-213-01487-6.
- Société savante d'Alsace et des régions de l'Est (1957). Trois provinces de l'Est: Lorraine, Alsace, Franche-Comté [Three eastern provinces: Lorraine, Alsace, Franche-Comté] (in French). Paris, Strasbourg: Éd. F.-X. Le Roux. pp. 119–127.

=== Articles ===
- Bischoff, Georges (2003). "La montagne et les voyageurs à la fin du Moyen Âge: de l'indifférence au regard" [The mountain and travelers at the end of the Middle Ages: from indifference to the gaze]. Actes des congrès de la SHMES (in French). 34. Chambéry: 395–413. doi:10.3406/shmes.2003.1865.
- Heili, Pierre (1988). "Le passage de Bussang à travers les siècles" [Bussang's passage through the centuries]. Dialogues Transvosgiens (in French). 6: 11–18.
- Heili, Pierre (1991). "Un grand projet manqué: le tunnel ferroviaire de Bussang" [A major failed project: the Bussang railway tunnel] (PDF). Dialogues Transvosgiens (in French). 1988–91: 10.
- Horber, Raymond (1983). "La route de Bussang et son col, la R.N. 66 à travers les âges" [The Bussang road and its pass, the R.N. 66 through the ages]. Bulletin de la Société industrielle de Mulhouse (in French): 119–134.
- Kammerer, Odile (2003). "Les Vosges sont-elles une montagne au Moyen Âge ?" [Are the Vosges a mountain in the Middle Ages?]. Actes des congrès de la SHMES, 34e congrès: « Montagnes médiévales » (in French): 23–39. ISBN 2-85944-513-7.
- Clémentz, Élisabeth (2007). "Heider (Christine), Entre France et Allemagne : Thann, une ville de Haute-Alsace sous la domination des Habsbourg (1324-1648)" [Heider (Christine), Between France and Germany: Thann, a town in Upper Alsace under the domination of the Habsburgs (1324-1648)]. Revue d'Alsace (in French). 133.
- Drouot, Marc (1957). "Trois provinces de l'Est: Lorraine, Alsace, Franche-Comté: Le commerce du sel lorrain en Haute-Alsace, Sundgau, Brisgau et la concurrence des sels tyroliens" [Three Eastern provinces: Lorraine, Alsace, Franche-Comté: The trade in Lorraine salt in Upper Alsace, Sundgau, Brisgau and competition from Tyrolean salts]. Bulletin de la Société savante d'Alsace et des régions de l'Est (in French). 6. Paris, Strasbourg: Éd. F.-X. Le Roux et Librairie Istra: 119–127.
- Florence, Raymonde; Philippe, André (2004). "Série H : Clergé régulier avant 1790: série 7H: Prieuré du Saint-Mont" [Series H: Regular clergy before 1790: series 7H: Priory of Saint-Mont] (PDF). Archives Départementales des Vosges (in French).
- Garnier, Emmanuel (1993). "L'homme et la forêt dans la gruerie de Ramonchamp (XVIe – XVIIIe siècles)" [Man and the forest in the Ramonchamp crane factory (16th–18th centuries)]. Bulletin de la Haute-Moselle (in French). 21. Le Thillot: 3–29.
- Garnier, Emmanuel (1994). "L'homme et son milieu: Le massif du Grand Ventron à travers les âges" [Man and his environment: The Grand Ventron massif through the ages]. Bulletin du Parc Naturel Régional des Ballons des Vosges (in French).
- Germain, René (1996). "Déplacements temporaires et déplacements définitifs dans le centre de la France aux XIVe et XVe siècles" [Temporary and permanent movements in central France in the 14th and 15th centuries]. Actes des congrès de la Société des historiens médiévistes de l'enseignement supérieur public (in French): 53–61.
- Idoux, Abbé (1908). "Voies romaines de Langres à Strasbourg, de Corre à Charmes" [Roman roads from Langres to Strasbourg, from Corre to Charmes]. Bulletin de la Société philomatique vosgienne (in French). 33. Saint-Dié: Société philomatique vosgienne- Imprimerie C. Cuny: 115–18.
- Lenattier, Hélène (2011). "Histoire du sel en Lorraine" [History of salt in Lorraine]. Journée du Sel de l'Académie lorraine des sciences (in French).
- Maud’heux, Père (1897). "Voies antiques dans le Département des Vosges: Ruines et vestiges" [Ancient roads in the Vosges Department: Ruins and remains] (PDF). Annuaire général des Vosges (in French). Léon Louis: 34–57.
- Racine, Pierre (2003). "Le col du Saint-Gothard, maillon du grand commerce international (1260-1320)" [The Saint-Gothard Pass, a link in the great international trade (1260-1320)]. Actes des congrès de la SHMES, 34e congrès: « Montagnes médiévales » (in French): 63–82. ISBN 2-85944-513-7.
- Richard, E. (1909). "Histoire de Bussang (Vosges)" [History of Bussang (Vosges)]. Bulletin de la Société philomatique vosgienne (in French). 34. Saint-Dié: impr. C. Cuny: 5–370.
- Académie de Stanislas Fray (1853). "Guerres d'autrefois et leçons d'aujourd'hui" [Wars of the Past and Lessons of Today]. Mémoires de l'Académie de Stanislas (in French). 33 (6). Nancy: éd. Grimblot et Veuve Raybois.
- Ministère de l’Écologie, du Développement durable et de l’Énergie; Museum d’Histoire naturelle (2008). "FR4202002 – Vosges du Sud, Natura 2000 – Formulaire standard de données" [FR4202002 – Southern Vosges, Natura 2000 – Standard data form] (PDF). Journaux officiels République française (in French).
- Yante, Jean-Marie (2016). "Voirie romaine et itinéraires médiévaux: le cas de la Lorraine centrale" [Roman roads and medieval itineraries: the case of central Lorraine] (PDF). Mémoires de l'Académie nationale de Metz (in French): 107–127.

=== Archive funds ===
- Froidevaux, Philippe (1995). "La recherche en histoire des paroisses aux AAEB" [Research into parish history at the AAEB] (PDF). Rapport Annuel des AAEB (in French). Bâle: Fonds des Archives de l’ancien diocèse de Bâle.
- Archives départementales de Meurthe-et-Moselle (1790). "Clergé séculier avant 1790" [Secular clergy before 1790] (PDF). Archives Anciennes (Avant 1790) (in French). Nancy.
