= A38 autoroute =

Road in France

A38 autoroute
- La Côte-d'Orienne
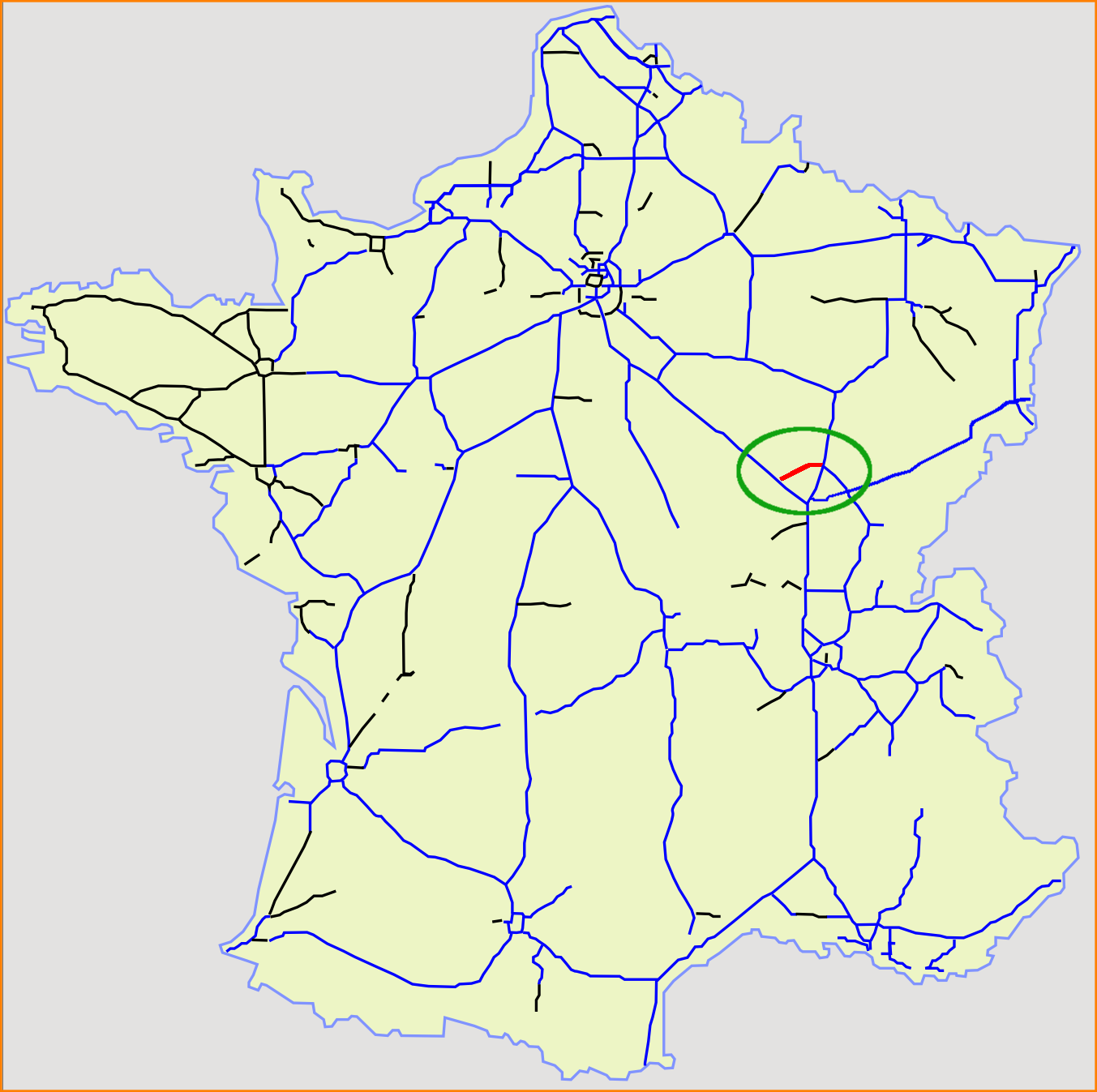

Route information
- Maintained by APRR; Conseil départemental de la Côte-d'Or; Dijon Métropole
- Length: 36 km (22 mi)
- Existed: 1973–present

Major junctions
- West end: E15 / E60 / A 6 in Pouilly-en-Auxois
- East end: Plombières-lès-Dijon

Location
- Country: France

Highway system
- Roads in France; Autoroutes; Routes nationales

The A38 autoroute is a toll free motorway in Côte-d'Or, France. The road runs between the A6 autoroute at Pouilly-en-Auxois to Dijon.

== List of exits and junctions ==
Region	Department	Junction	Destinations	Notes
Bourgogne-Franche-Comté	Côte-d'Or	A6 - A38	Paris, Auxerre, Lyon, Besançon	
Bourgogne-Franche-Comté	Côte-d'Or	24 : Pouilly-en-Auxois	Autun, Nevers, Saulieu, Pouilly-en-Auxois, Arnay-le-Duc, Bligny-sur-Ouche	
Bourgogne-Franche-Comté	Côte-d'Or	25 Créancey	Créancey	
Bourgogne-Franche-Comté	Côte-d'Or	26 : Civry-en-Montagne	Civry-en-Montagne, Semarey	
Bourgogne-Franche-Comté	Côte-d'Or	27 : Aubigny-lès-Sombernon	Aubigny-lès-Sombernon	
Bourgogne-Franche-Comté	Côte-d'Or	28 : Échannay	Sombernon, Échannay	
Bourgogne-Franche-Comté	Côte-d'Or	29 : Mesmont	Sombernon, Montbard, Mesmont, Auxerre	
Bourgogne-Franche-Comté	Côte-d'Or	30 : Pont-de-Pany	Bligny-sur-Ouche, Sainte-Marie-sur-Ouche	
Bourgogne-Franche-Comté	Côte-d'Or	31 : Fleurey-sur-Ouche	Fleurey-sur-Ouche	
Bourgogne-Franche-Comté	Côte-d'Or	32 : Velars-sur-Ouche	Velars-sur-Ouche, Corcelles-les-Monts	
Bourgogne-Franche-Comté	Côte-d'Or	33 : Plombières-lès-Dijon	Plombières-lès-Dijon	
End of the A 38
1.000 mi = 1.609 km; 1.000 km = 0.621 mi
