= Avosnes =

- Commune
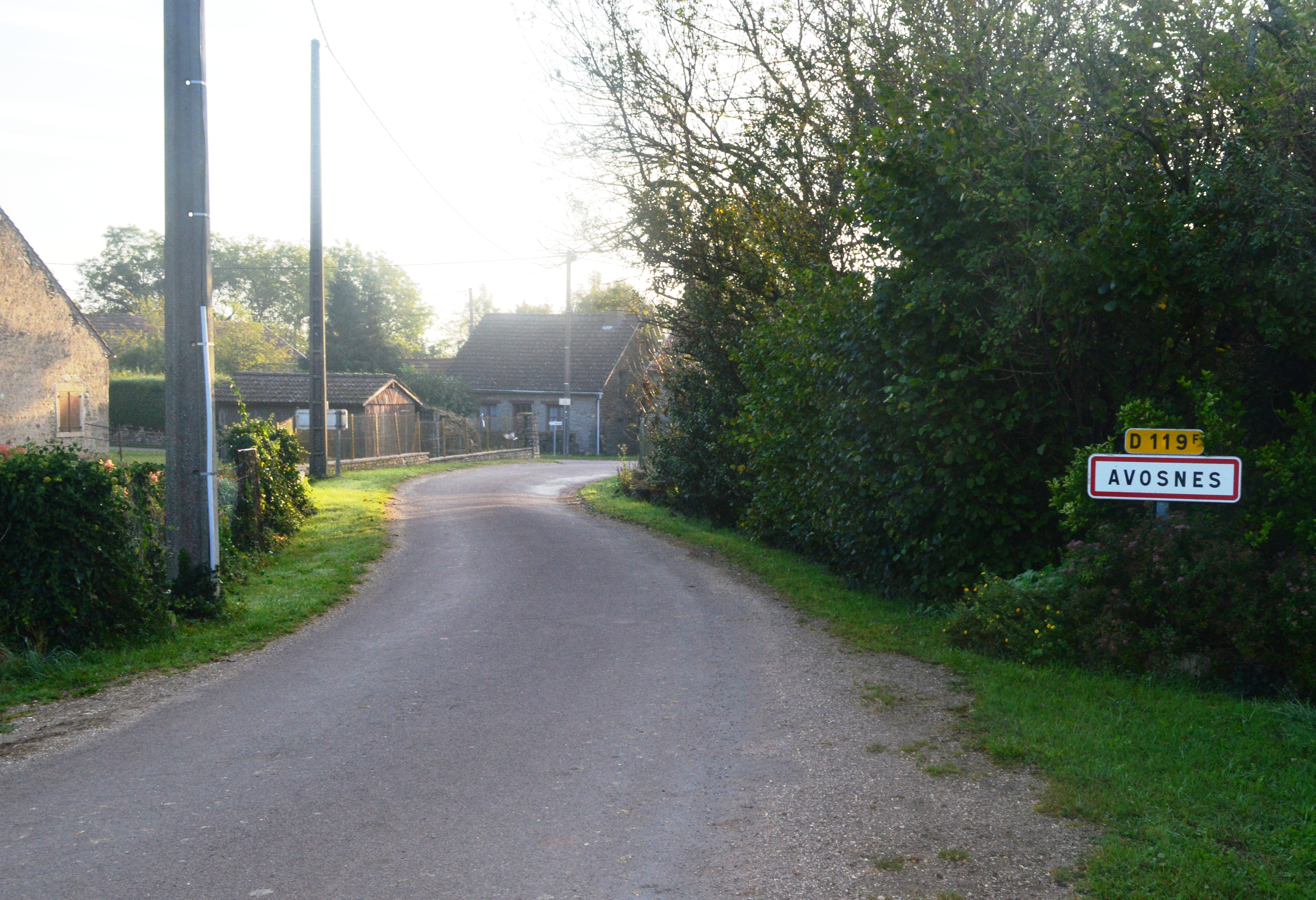
- The road into Avosnes

- Coat of arms
- Location of Avosnes
- Location within France Location within Bourgogne-Franche-Comté
- Coordinates: 47°21′59″N 4°38′35″E
- Country: France
- Region: Bourgogne-Franche-Comté
- Department: Côte-d'Or
- Arrondissement: Montbard
- Canton: Semur-en-Auxois
- Intercommunality: CC Terres Auxois

Government
  - Mayor (2020–2026): Adrien Menetrier
- Area^{1}: 11.54 km^{2} (4.46 sq mi)
- Elevation: 400 m (1,300 ft)
- Highest elevation: 552 m (1,811 ft)
- Lowest elevation: 368 m (1,207 ft)
- Population (2023): 83
  - Density: 7.2/km^{2} (19/sq mi)
- Time zone: UTC+01:00 (CET)
  - Summer (DST): UTC+02:00 (CEST)
- INSEE/Postal code: 21040 /21350
- ^{1} French Land Register data, which excludes lakes, ponds, glaciers > 1 km^{2} (0.386 sq mi or 247 acres) and river estuaries.

Avosnes (French pronunciation: [avon]) is a commune in the Côte-d'Or department in the Bourgogne-Franche-Comté region of eastern France.

== Geography ==
Avosnes is located some 25 km west of Dijon and 10 km north-west of Sombernon. Access to the commune is by the D9 road which comes from Villy-en-Auxois in the north and passes down the eastern side of the commune south to Saint-Mesmin. Access to the village is by the D119F which goes west from the D9 in the commune passing through the village and continuing west to join the D119 north of Saffres. Apart from the village there is the hamlet of Barain in the north-west of the commune. There are large forests in the north of the commune with scattered forests elsewhere and the rest of the commune is farmland.

The Ozerain river flows from the south through the eastern side of the commune as it flows north to join the Brenne just south of Venarey-les-Laumes. The Ruisseau de Revillon rises in the centre of the commune and flows north to join the Ozerain at Chevannay.

== Administration ==
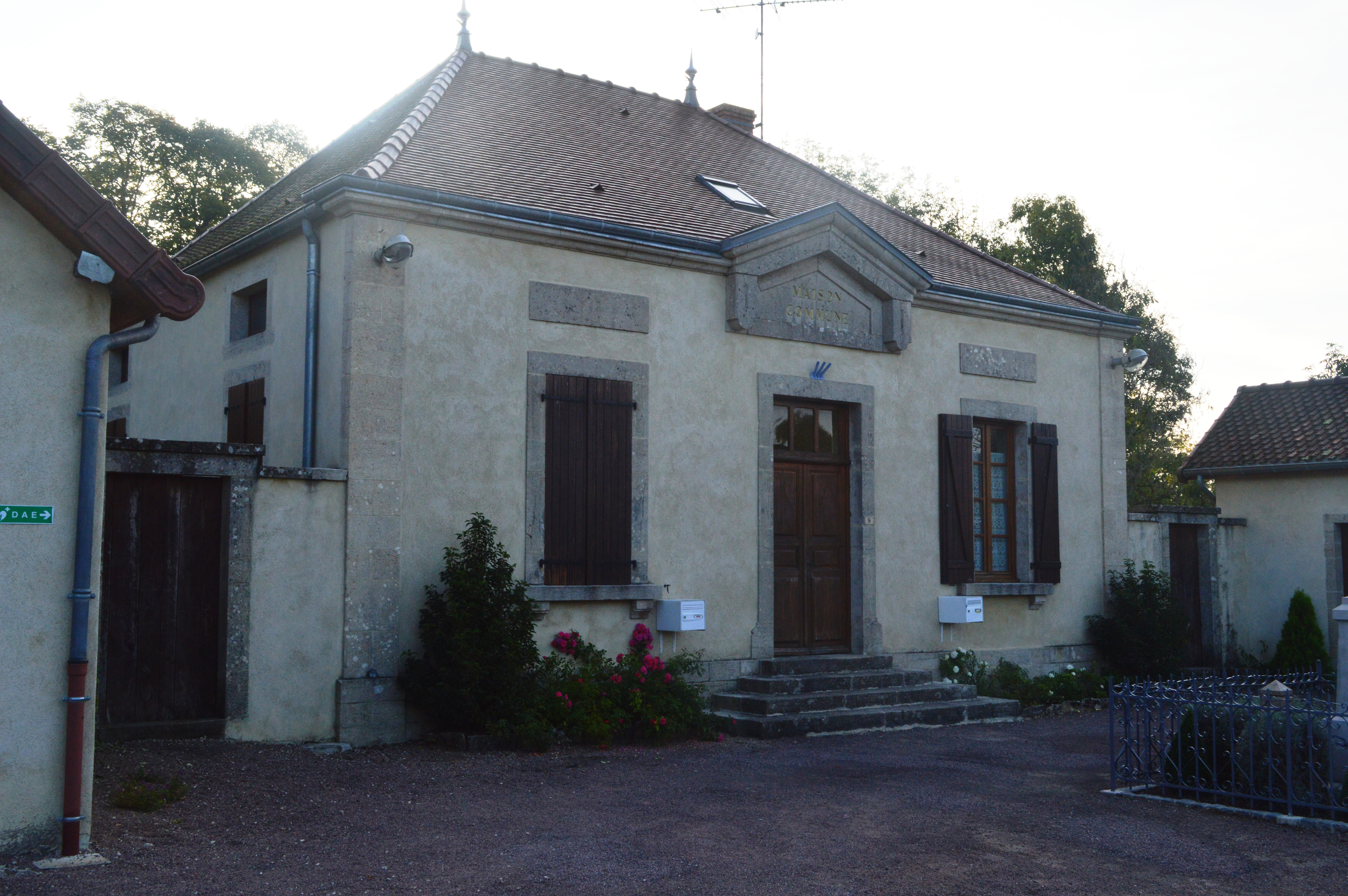
The Town Hall

List of Successive Mayors

From	To	Name
2001	2008	Philbert Fouard
2008	2014	Gilles Mousseron
2014	2020	Patrick Guimont
2020	2026	Adrien Menetrier

== Demography ==
The inhabitants of the commune are known as Avosniens or Avosniennes in French.

Historical population

Year	Pop.	±% p.a.
1793	421	—
1821	354	−0.62%
1846	328	−0.30%
1872	269	−0.76%
1901	206	−0.92%
1926	151	−1.23%
1946	133	−0.63%
1962	107	−1.35%
1968	92	−2.49%

Year	Pop.	±% p.a.
1975	77	−2.51%
1982	76	−0.19%
1990	66	−1.75%
1999	73	+1.13%
2007	73	+0.00%
2012	79	+1.59%
2017	89	+2.41%
2023	83	−1.16%

Source: EHESS and INSEE

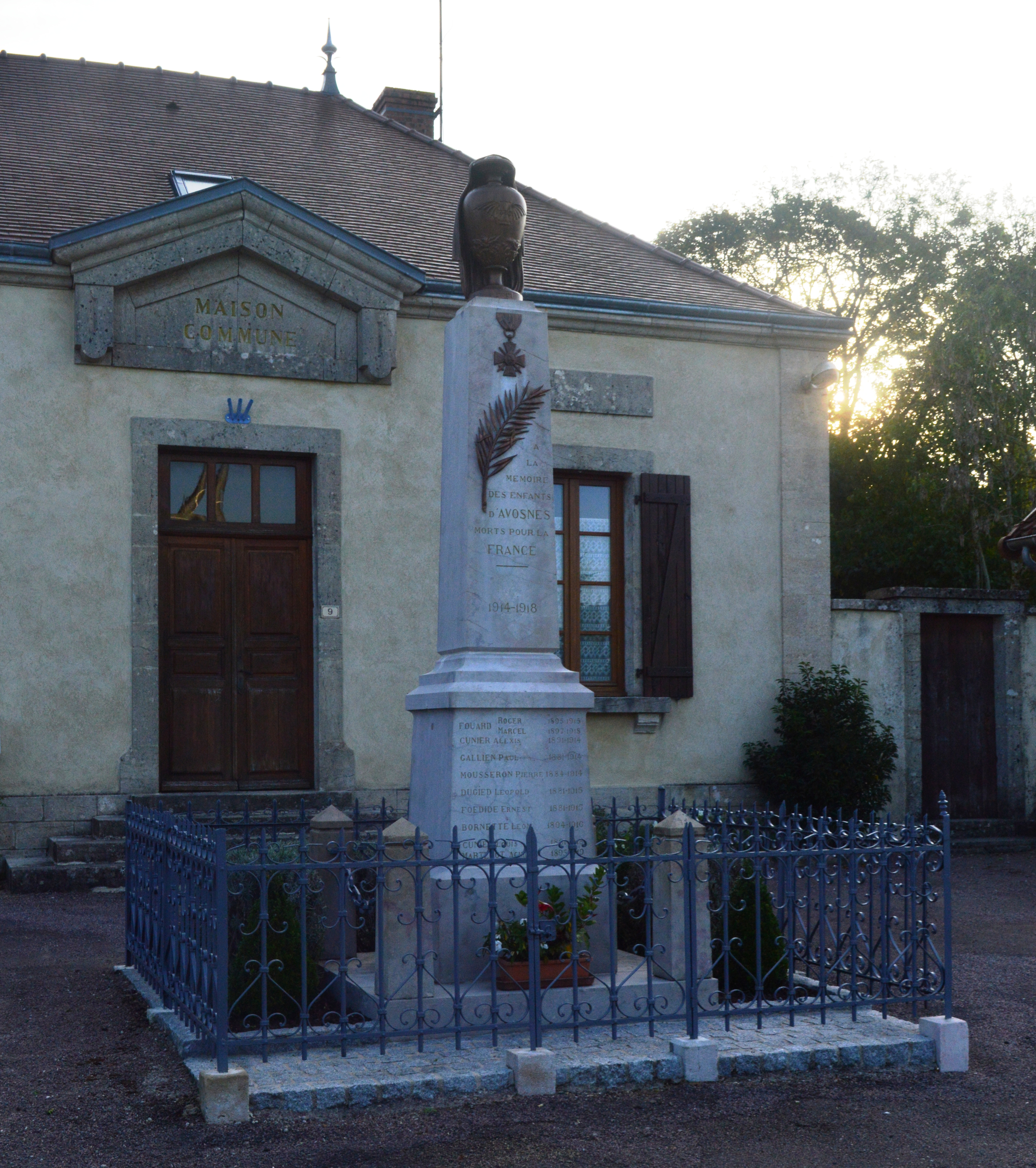
Avosnes War Memorial

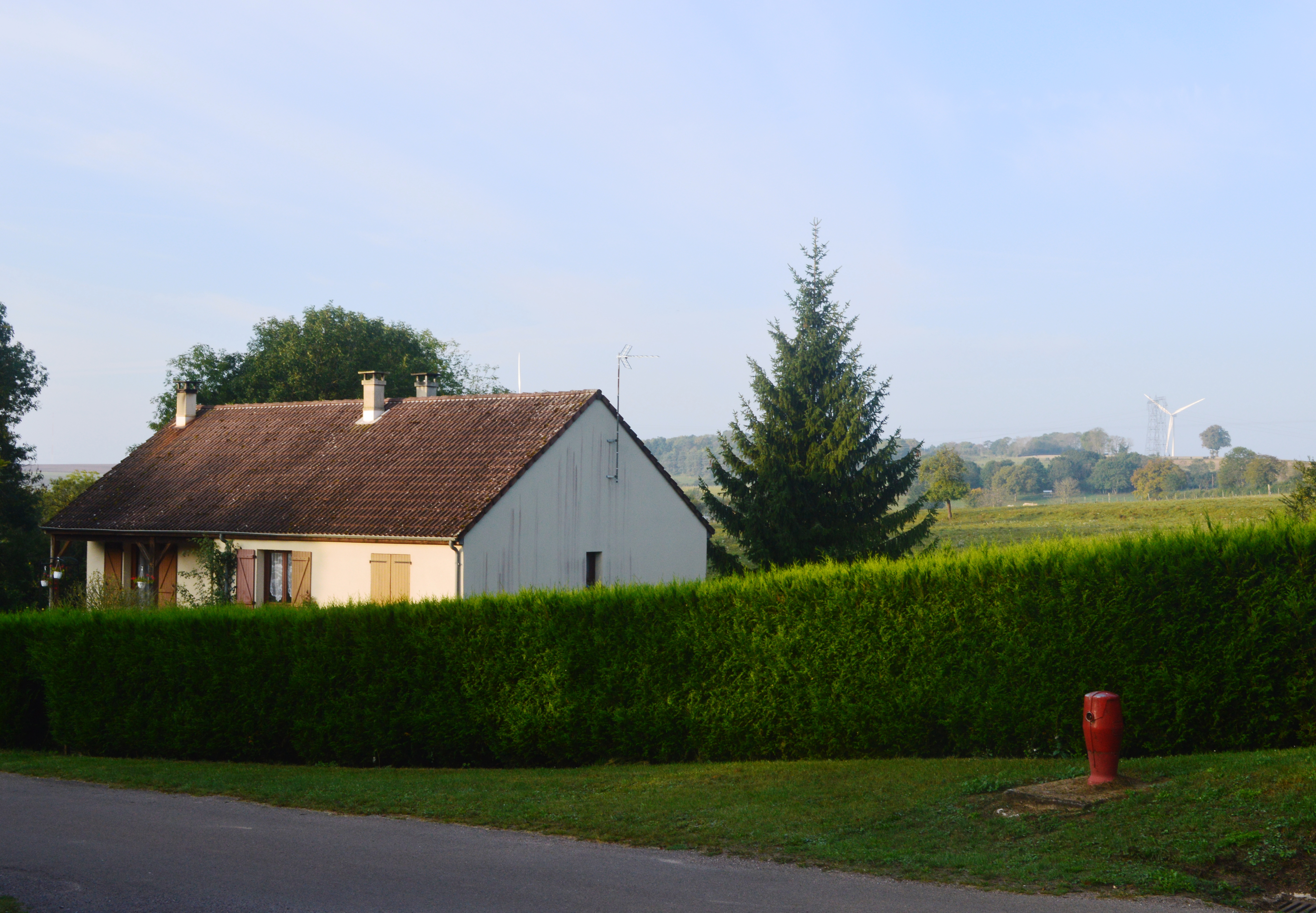
Avosnes Landscape

== Culture and heritage ==
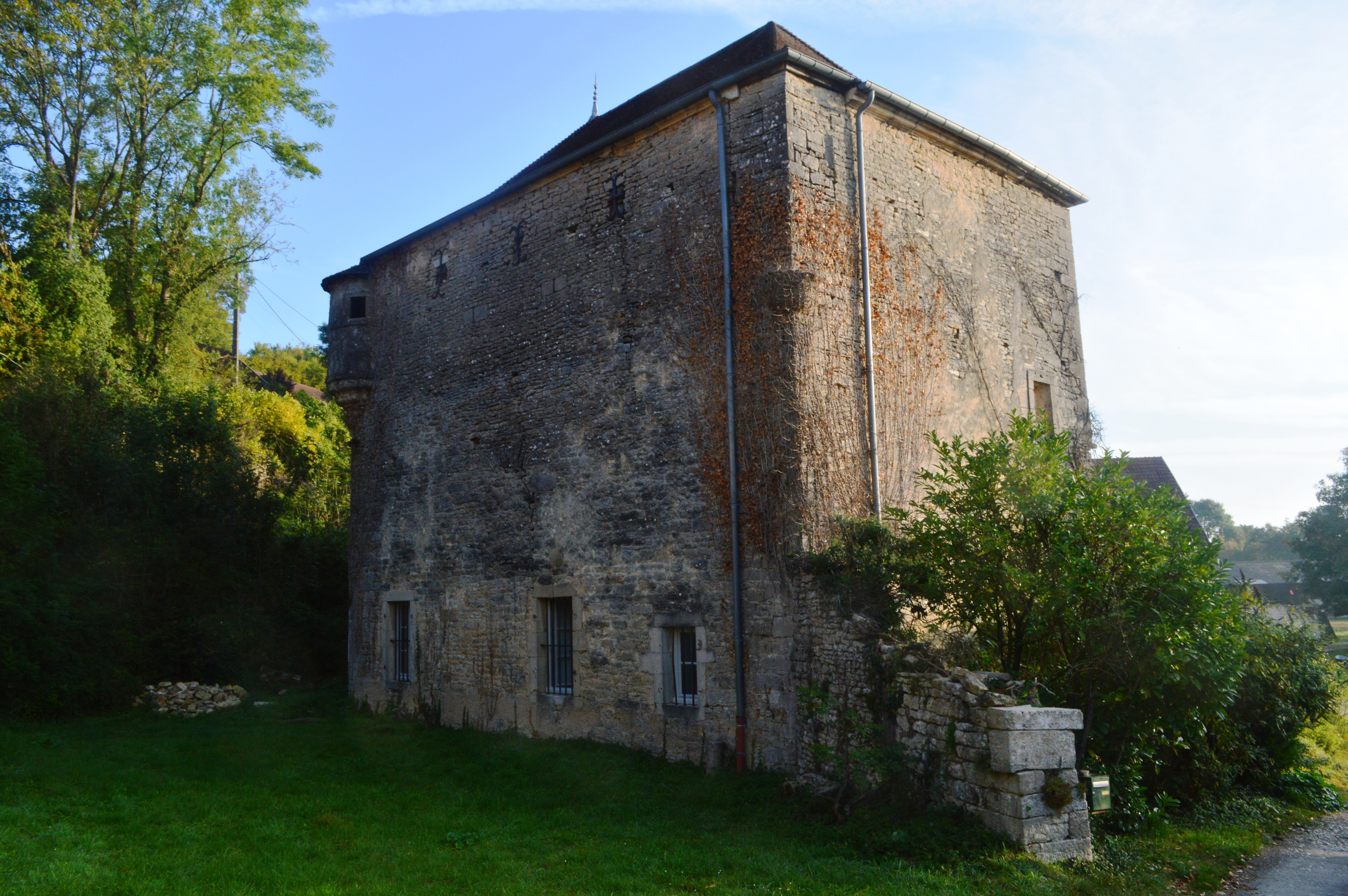
Avosnes Chateau

=== Civil heritage ===
The commune has one structure that is registered as an historical monument:

- A former Chateau (16th century)

=== Religious heritage ===
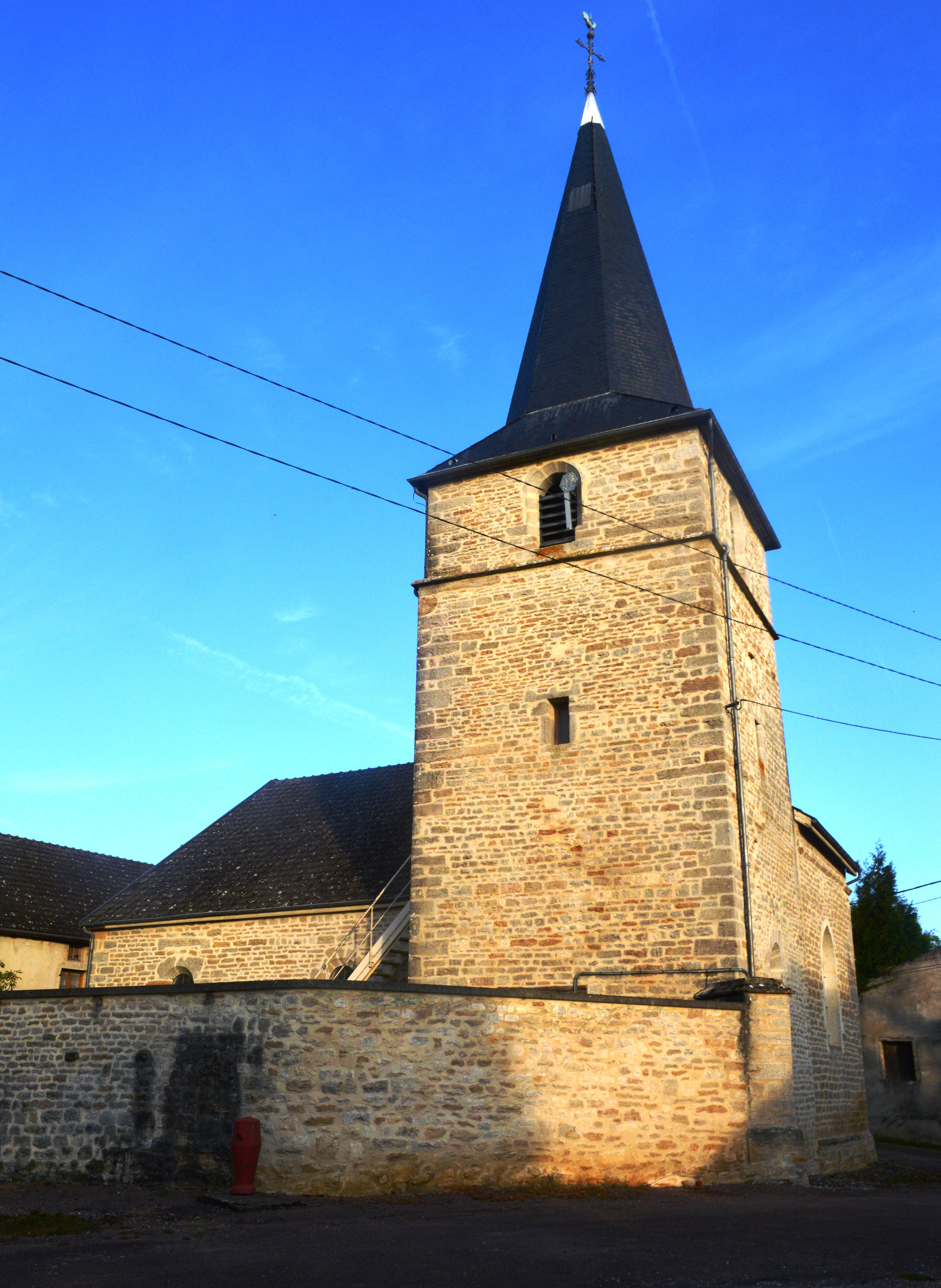
Avosnes Church

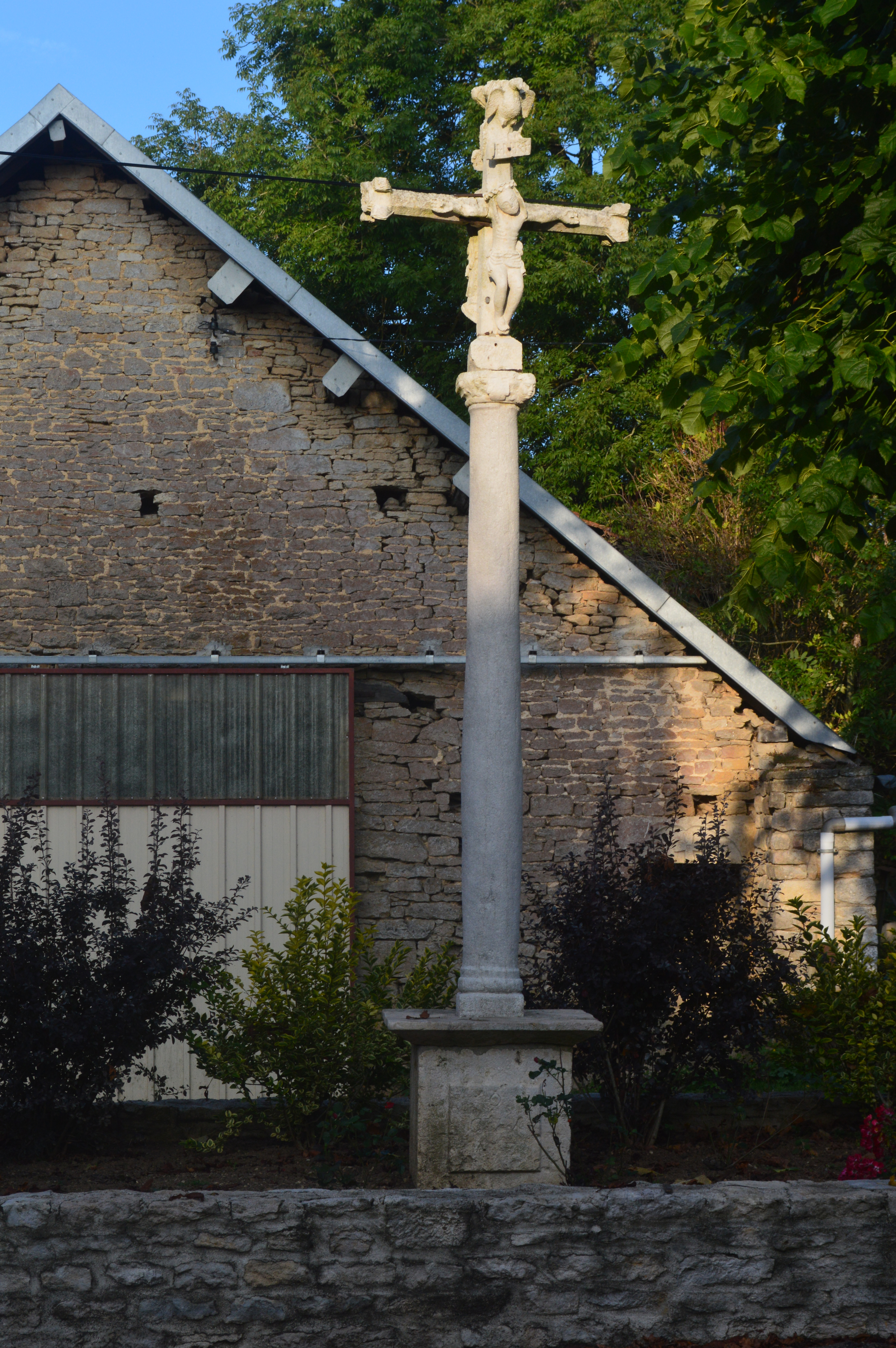
Avosnes Wayside Cross

The commune has one religious structure that is registered as an historical monument:

- A Chapel and Cross at Barain (15th century) The Chapel contains many items that are registered as historical objects:
  - A Monument to the Memory of Mary of Brittany (1756)
  - A Retable: Resurrection of Christ (1756)
  - 2 Retables (18th century)
  - A Baptismal font and Retable (1756)
  - A Statue: Virgin and child (15th century)
  - A Statue: Saint Antoine (16th century)
  - A Group Sculpture: Virgin of Pity (16th century)
  - A Bronze Bell (1788)
  - A Stoup (15th century)

== See also ==
- Communes of the Côte-d'Or department
