= Aubigny-lès-Sombernon =

- Commune
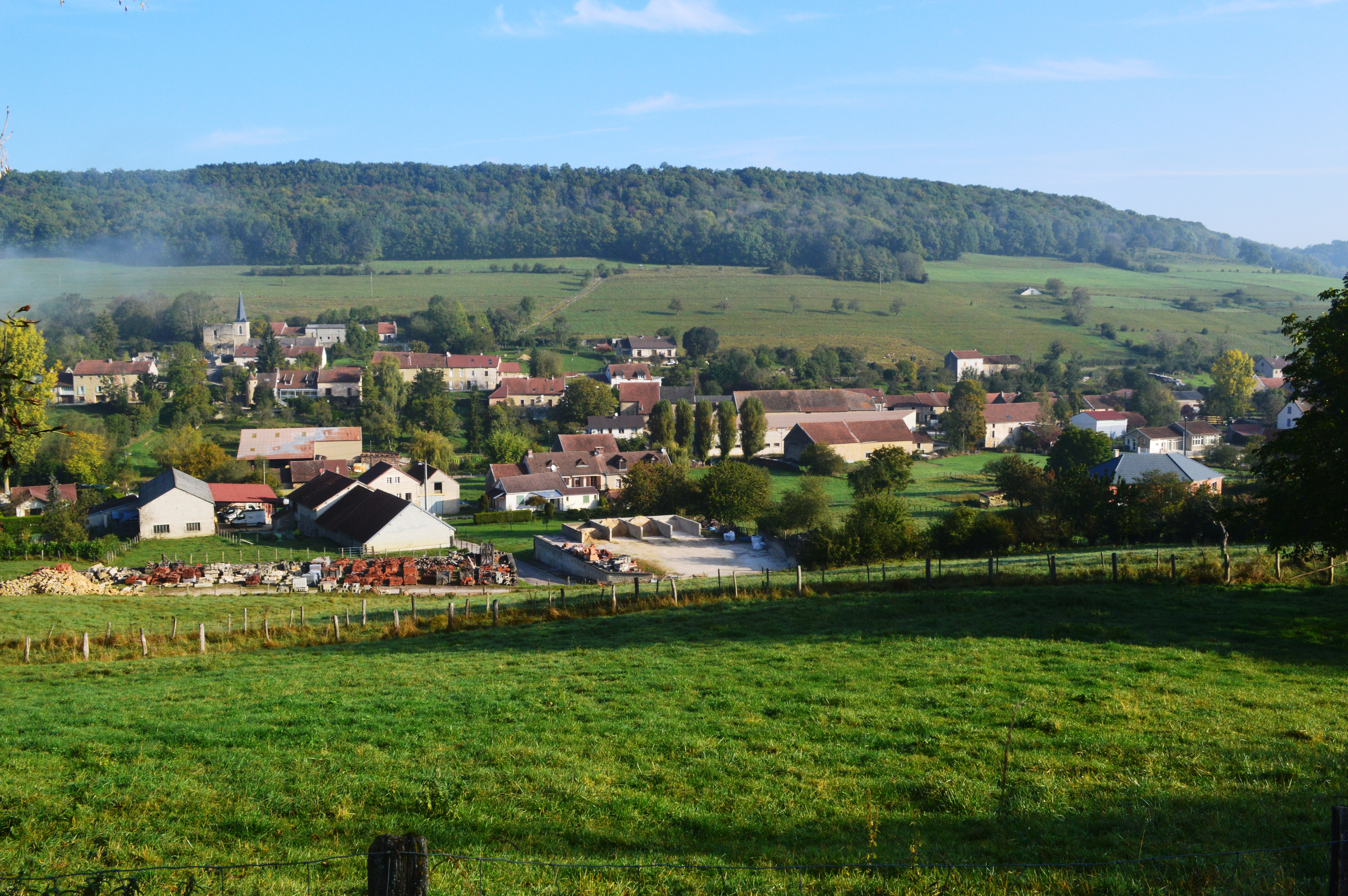
- A general view of Aubigny-lès-Sombernon

- Coat of arms
- Location of Aubigny-lès-Sombernon
- Location within France Location within Bourgogne-Franche-Comté
- Coordinates: 47°18′19″N 4°38′38″E
- Country: France
- Region: Bourgogne-Franche-Comté
- Department: Côte-d'Or
- Arrondissement: Dijon
- Canton: Talant
- Intercommunality: CC Ouche Montagne

Government
  - Mayor (2020–2026): Jean-Philippe Montuelle
- Area^{1}: 7.93 km^{2} (3.06 sq mi)
- Highest elevation: 551 m (1,808 ft)
- Lowest elevation: 395 m (1,296 ft)
- Population (2023): 175
  - Density: 22.1/km^{2} (57.2/sq mi)
- Time zone: UTC+01:00 (CET)
  - Summer (DST): UTC+02:00 (CEST)
- INSEE/Postal code: 21033 /21540
- ^{1} French Land Register data, which excludes lakes, ponds, glaciers > 1 km^{2} (0.386 sq mi or 247 acres) and river estuaries.

Aubigny-lès-Sombernon (French pronunciation: [obiɲi lɛ sɔ̃bɛʁnɔ̃], literally Aubigny near Sombernon) is a commune in the Côte-d'Or department in the Bourgogne-Franche-Comté region of eastern France.

== Geography ==
Aubigny-lès-Sombernon is located some 33 km west of Dijon and 12 km north-east of Créancey. Access to the commune is by road D905 (Route de Paris) from Sombernon in the east passing through the commune and the village and continuing north-west to Grosbois-en-Montagne. The A38 autoroute passes through the south of the commune with Exit 27 for Civry-en-Montagne in the south-west of the commune and Exit 27 in the south-east of the commune which accesses the village. The D16L road goes south-west from the village to join the D16 which follows the A38 south-west. The commune has a band of forest from west to east through the middle of the commune south of the village and a smaller band of forest to the north with the rest of the commune farmland.

The Brenne river flows through the commune and the village from the east and flows west into the Grosbois Reservoir west of the commune. The upper reach of the reservoir extends into the commune. The Ruisseau de Roussot flows from the south-east and joins the Brenne in the east of the commune.

=== Heraldry ===
Arms of Aubigny-lès-Sombernon	Blazon: Gules, a lion of ermine.

== Administration ==
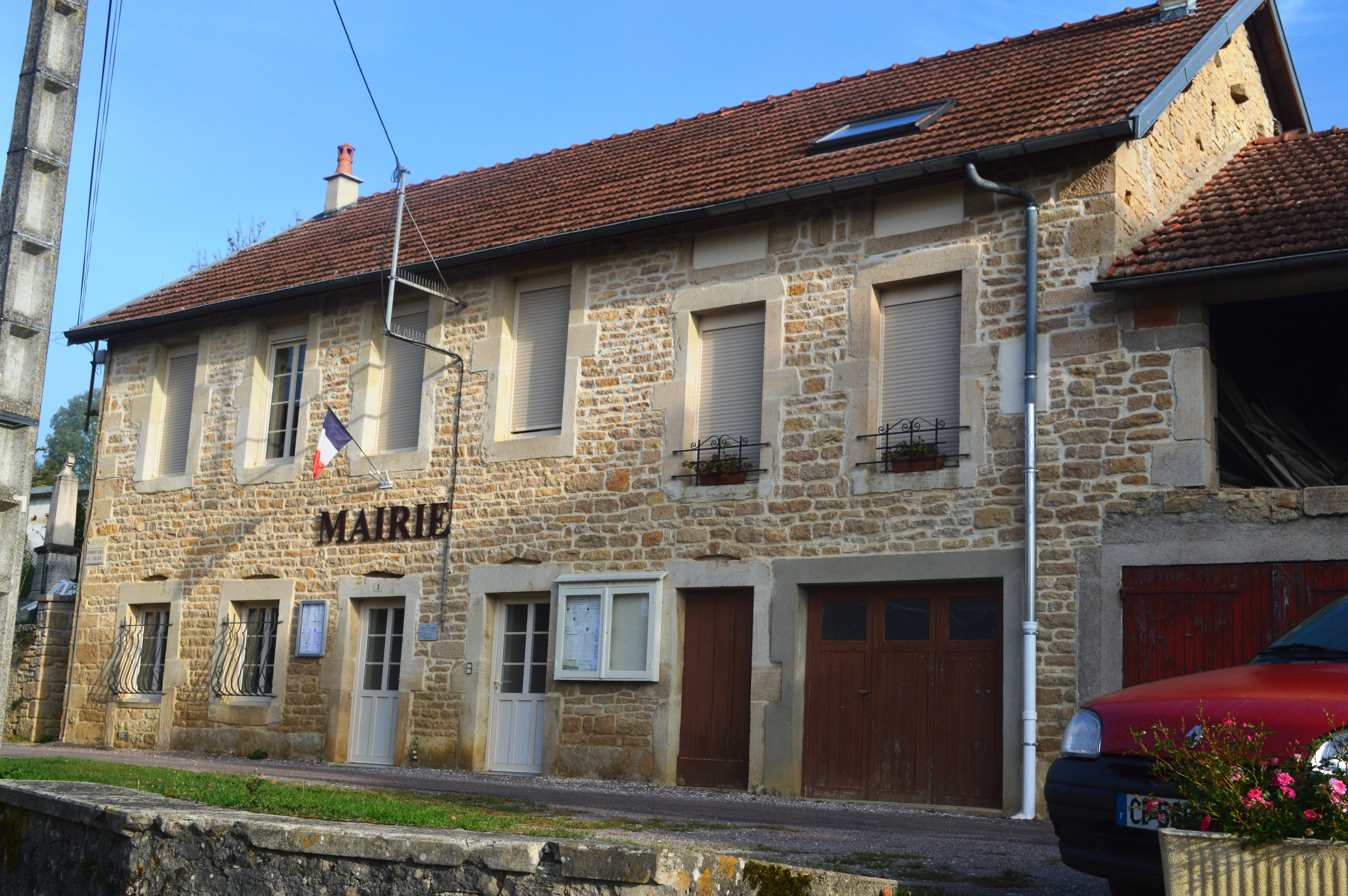
The Town Hall

List of Successive Mayors

From	To	Name
2001	2008	Daniel Hory
2008	2014	Henri Poulet
2014	2020	Valérie Sirugue-Labille
2020	2026	Jean-Philippe Montuelle

== Demography ==
Historical population

Year	Pop.	±% p.a.
1793	267	—
1821	269	+0.03%
1846	296	+0.38%
1872	253	−0.60%
1901	197	−0.86%
1926	129	−1.68%
1946	125	−0.16%
1962	109	−0.85%
1968	98	−1.76%

Year	Pop.	±% p.a.
1975	103	+0.71%
1982	129	+3.27%
1990	118	−1.11%
1999	120	+0.19%
2007	125	+0.51%
2012	150	+3.71%
2017	150	+0.00%
2023	175	+2.60%

Source: EHESS and INSEE

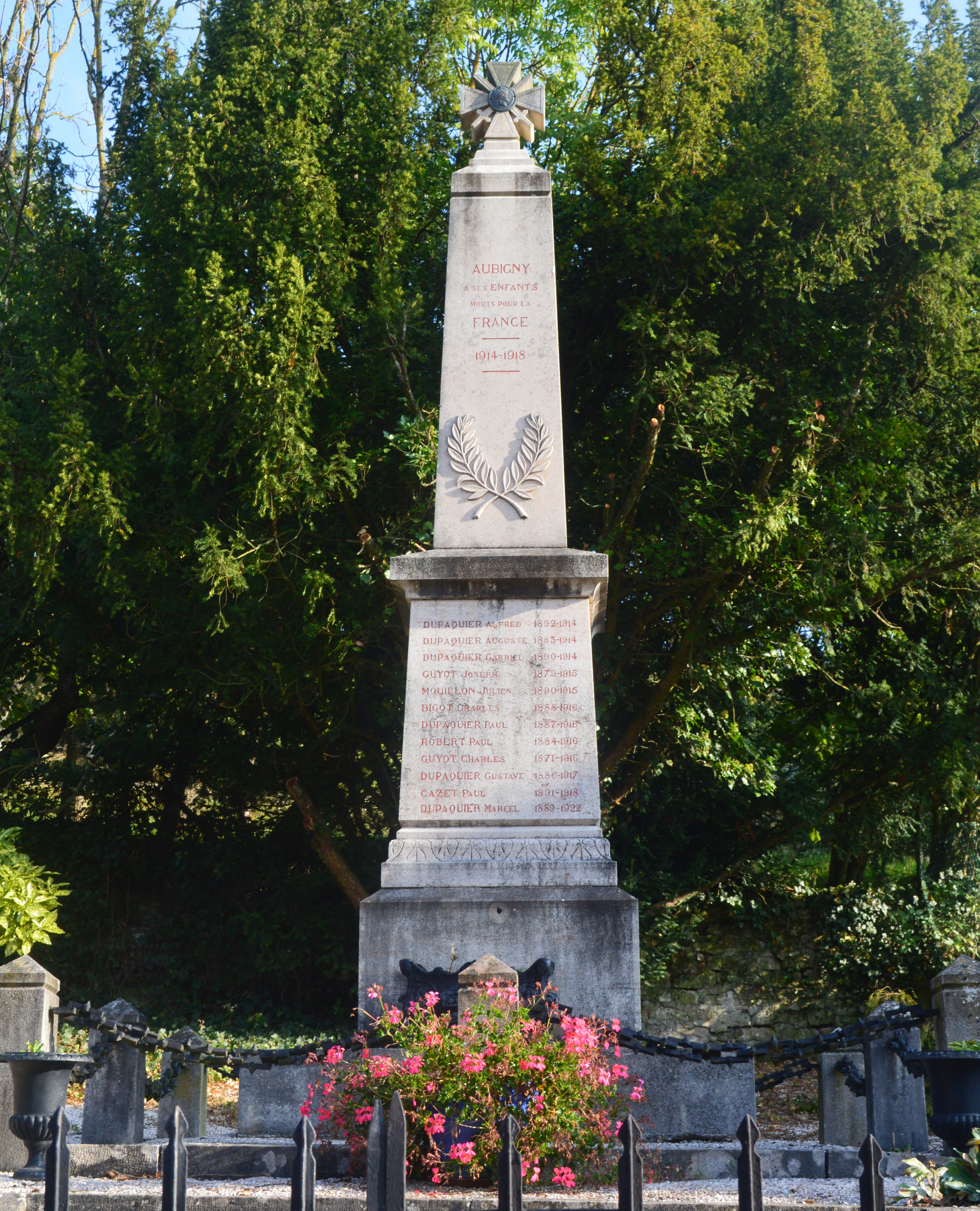
Aubigny-lès-Sombernon War Memorial

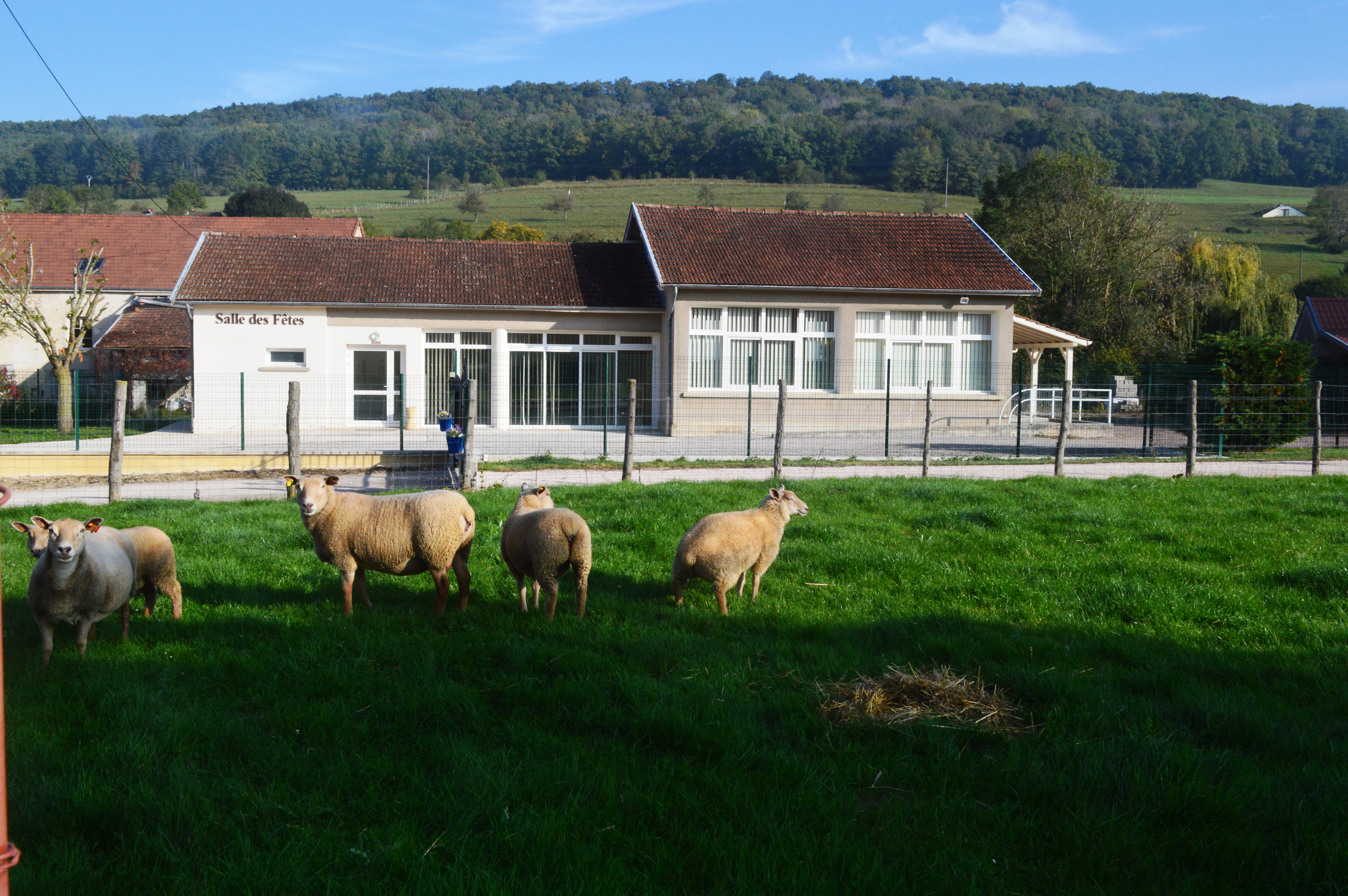
The Community Hall

== Culture and heritage ==
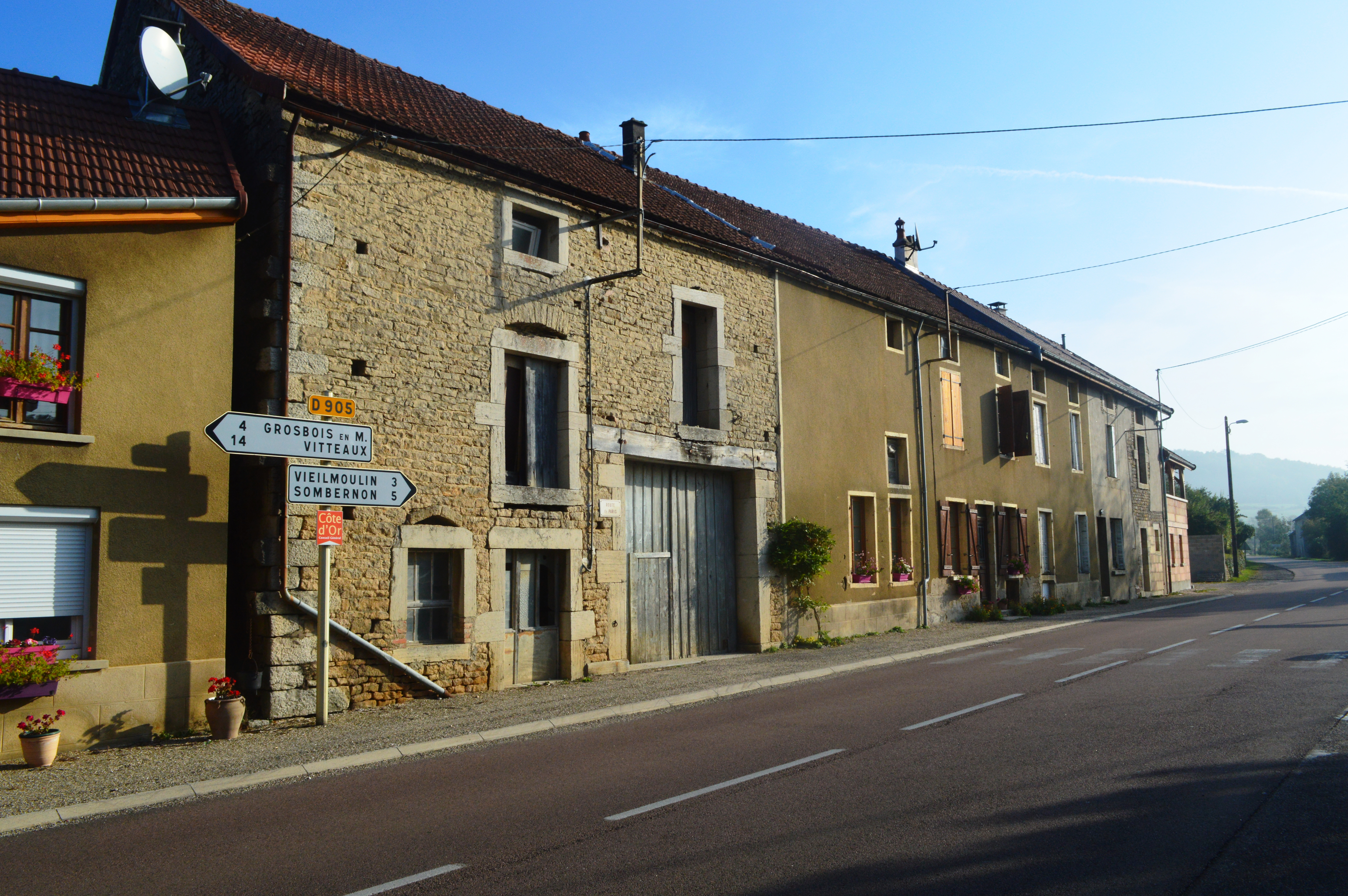
A street in Aubigny-lès-Sombernon

=== Civil heritage ===
The commune has a number of buildings and structures that are registered as historical monuments:

- A Farmhouse (1) (19th century)
- A Farmhouse (2) (19th century)
- A Fortified Chateau (1594)
- 2 Farmhouses (19th century)

=== Religious heritage ===
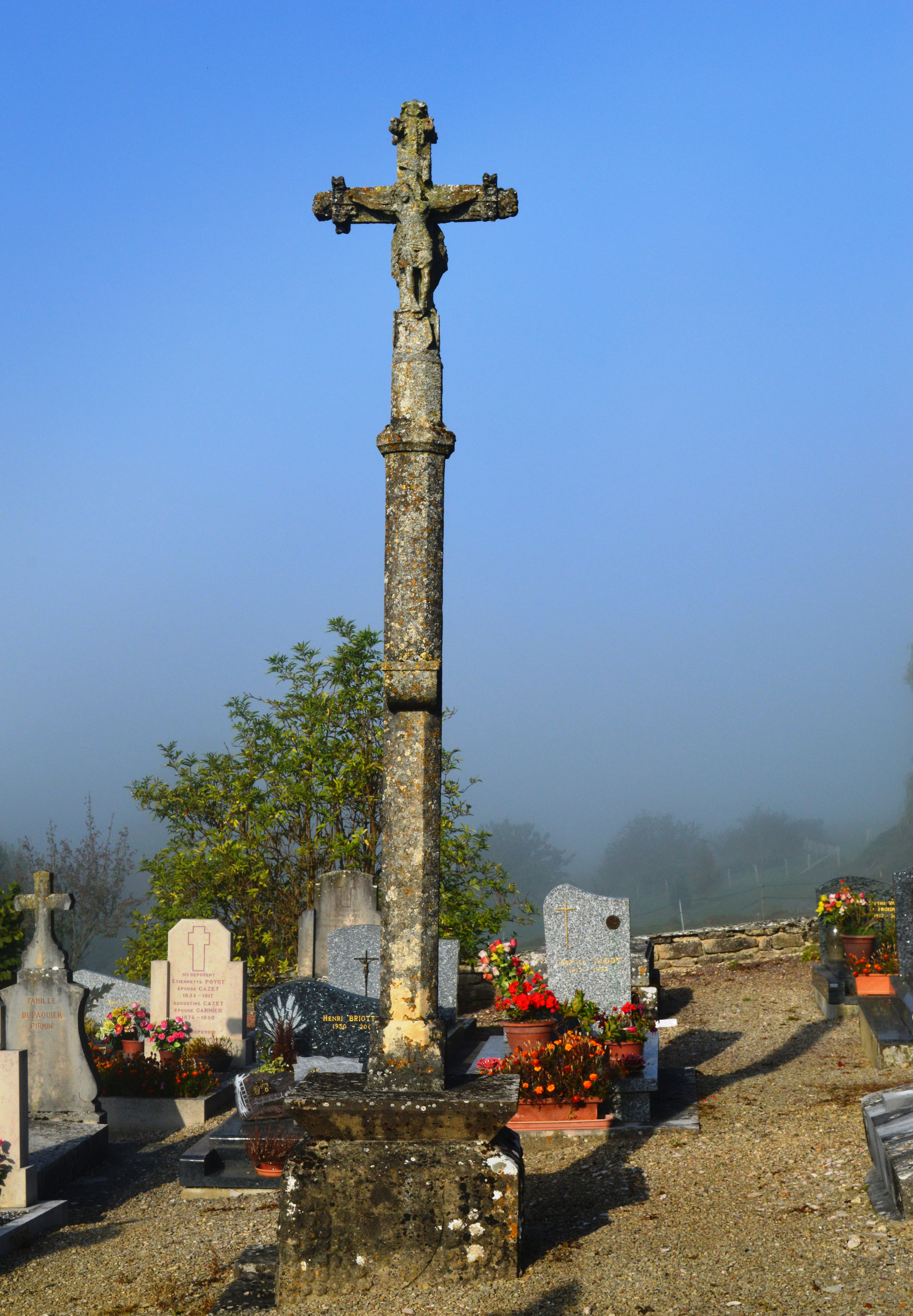
The Cemetery Cross

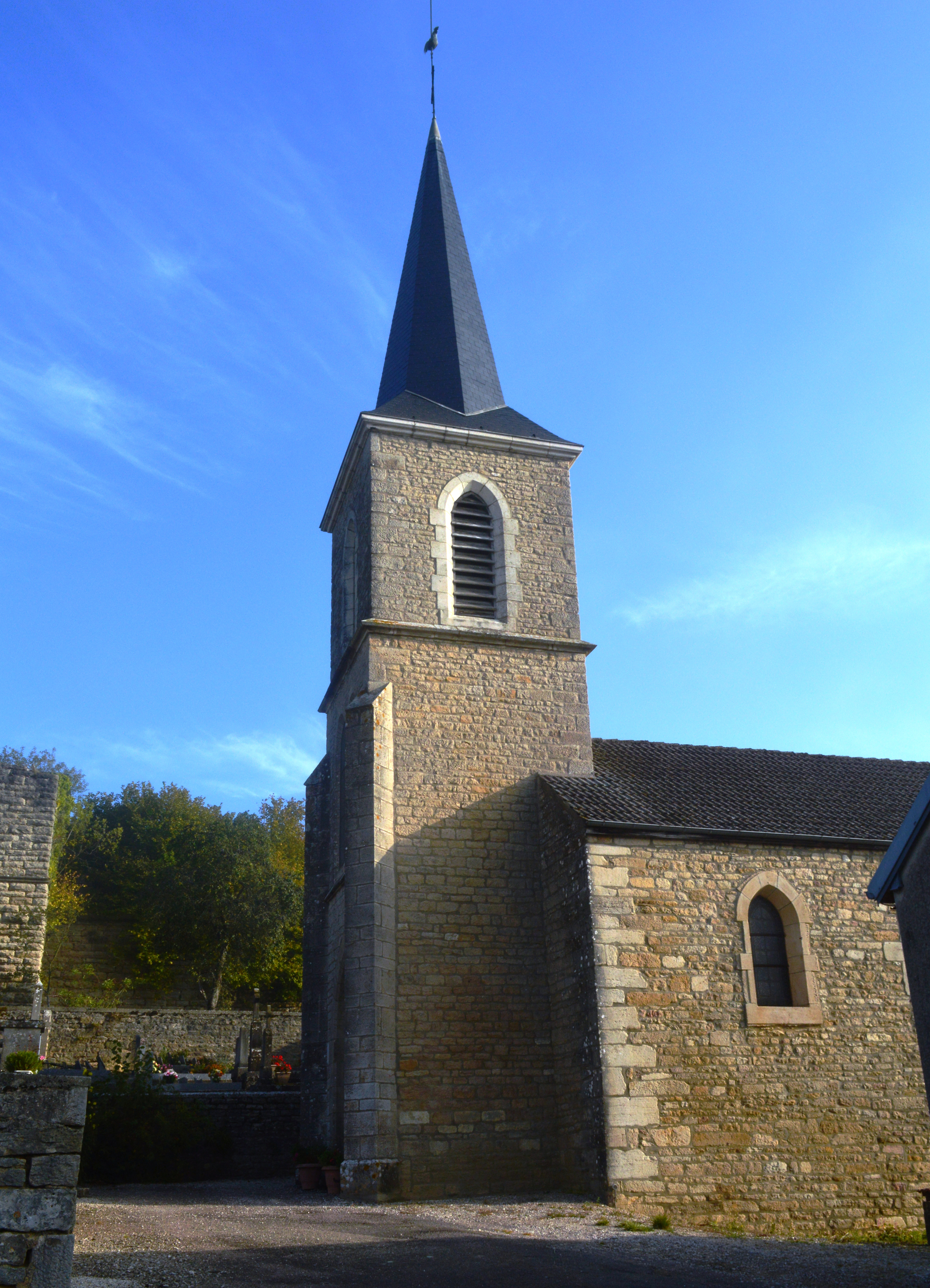
The Church of Saint Paul

The commune has a number of religious buildings and structures that are registered as historical monuments:

- A Cemetery Cross (15th century)
- A Monumental Cross (15th century)
- The Parish Church of Saint-Paul (14th century)

The Parish Church of Saint-Paul contains many items that are registered as historical objects:

- A Statue: Saint Roch (16th century)
- A Statue: Gabrielle of Rochechouart (16th century)
- A Reliquary (16th century)
- An Altar Cross (17th century)
- A Processional Staff (17th century)
- A Group Statue: The education of the Virgin (19th century)
- A Group Statuette: Saint Roch (16th century)
- A Statuette: Gabrielle of Rochechouart (16th century)
- A Statue: Virgin and Child (16th century)
- A Cross: Christ on the Cross (17th century)
- A Statue: Saint Blaise (16th century)
- A Statuette: Saint with open book (16th century)
- The Choir enclosure (19th century)

== See also ==
- Communes of the Côte-d'Or department
