= Saint-Mesmin =

Saint-Mesmin may refer to the following places in France:

- Saint-Mesmin, Aube, a commune in the Aube department
- Saint-Mesmin, Côte-d'Or, a commune in the Côte-d'Or department
- Saint-Mesmin, Dordogne, a commune in the Dordogne department
- Saint-Mesmin, Vendée, a commune in the Vendée department
- La Chapelle-Saint-Mesmin, a commune in the Loiret department
- Saint-Hilaire-Saint-Mesmin, a commune in the Loiret department
- Saint-Pryvé-Saint-Mesmin, a commune in the Loiret department
