= Brenne =

Brenne has the following meanings:

- An historical region in the south of the Berry (province) of France
- A regional natural park, the Parc naturel régional de la Brenne in the Indre département of France
- Brenne (river), tributary of the Armançon, of the Seine basin
- Brenne (Cisse), tributary of the Cisse, of the Loire basin
