= George Montbard =

French caricaturist and illustrator

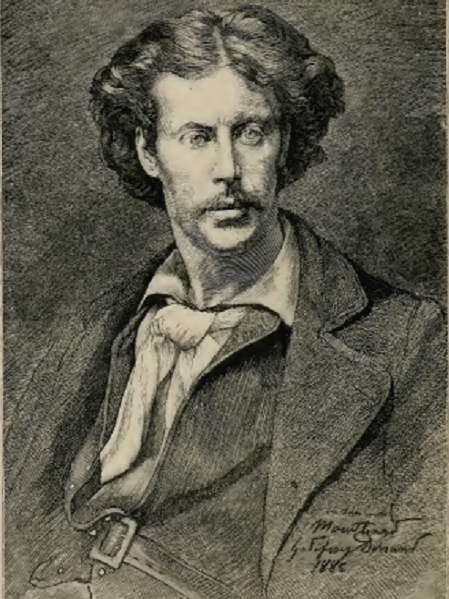
- 1886 portrait by Godefroy Durand
- Born: Charles Auguste Loye; 2 August 1841; Montbard
- Died: 5 August 1905 (aged 64); Dinard
- Other name: G. Montbard
- Occupations: caricaturist painter

George Montbard, real name Charles Auguste Loye (2 August 1841 – 5 August 1905) was a French artist, illustrator and caricaturist who signed his work "G. Montbard".

== Biography ==
Loye was born in Montbard on 2 August 1841. His parents were Charles Auguste Loye, 25 years old at his birth, who was a tax inspector in Chatellerault, in Nièvre, Burgundy, and Léopoldine Gaveau.

Under the Second French Empire, he published a caricature of Victor Hugo and another of Sainte-Beuve in 1867 in Le Masque, a theatrical weekly. The following year, he published another caricature of Hugo in Gulliver, a satirical weekly: under the title "Romanticism", Hugo is depicted in a medieval setting as the flag-bearer of the Romantic Movement. His drawings also appeared in La Rue, a periodical published by his friend Jules Vallès, as well as in satirical publications such as Le Monde illustré (1880) and L'Eclipse. He also published a single issue of his own weekly satirical periodical, La Fronde illustrée, dated 27 March 1871.

In My Days of Adventure; The Fall of France, 1870–71, Ernest Alfred Vizetelly, who had hired Montbard as an illustrator, writes that at that time Montbard "was a Republican—in fact, a future Communard" and did not appreciate an unexpected meeting in the street with Napoleon III, who took an interest in the sketch he was making. He refused to shave his "revolutionary beard" at the request of the chamberlain.

He became actively involved in the Paris Commune in 1871. His friend the illustrator Andre Gill thought that he had died on the battlefield. But in fact Montbard fled to London to escape the loyalist Versaillais troops, sending his drawings from there to Le Monde illustré and L'Eclipse and also working for several London periodicals.

In 1872, he illustrated the riots in Ireland for the Illustrated London News, and a watercolour portrait of Thomas Binney by him was published in Vanity Fair on 12 October 1872, signed "Charles Augute Loye". His caricature of Léon Gambetta, also published in Vanity Fair on 19 October 1872, bears the caption: "He devoured France with activity." In 1876, Henri Bellenger published Londres pittoresque et la vie anglaise, with eight drawings by Montbard. In 1882 Vincent van Gogh, who was also working for the Illustrated London News, mentioned receiving illustrations by him of the Channel Islands.

Even after the amnesty of 1880, Montbard remained in London, where he married. His wife Alice was twenty years his junior, born in London in 1861. Montbard lived at 3 Augustus Square, according to the census of 1891 under the name of George Montbard. A daughter named Madeleine was apparently born in 1882 at that address. In the late 1880s he built a studio house for himself and his family, which still survives at 83 Dartmouth Park Hill.

For Montbard, art was also an opportunity to share his political views. Thus in 1889, he concludes in his book L' Ennemi "Delenda est Germania, si vult vivere Gallia", which may be translated "Germany must be destroyed for France to live." In The Case of John Bull in Egypt, the Transvaal, Venezuela and Elsewhere, he comments on the politics of the British Empire in the guise of a friendly conversation between France and John Bull.

Montbard did not confine himself to drawing and watercolors; he also painted in oils. He travelled extensively, particularly to the Maghreb. This was also the period of the beginnings of photography, which came to compete with the illustrator's art. This is why, albeit with some humour, Montbard writes of it in Among the Moors as "producing ... a deformed and lugubrious picture of men and things" and possibly constituting "a terrible engine of destruction, an explosive substance that was destined to pulverise the world of art".

In 1896, he illustrated Rudyard Kipling's poem "The 'eathen" for Pearson's Magazine.

His grave is in the cemetery at Dinard, Normandy, where his wife lived in the viscount's manor, Ker Loïs.

== Books ==
- G. Montbard. The Land of the Sphinx. London: Hutchinson, 1894. OCLC 827718757. Online at the Internet Archive.
- G. Montbard. Among the Moors: Sketches of Oriental Life. London: S. Low, Marston & Co., 1894. OCLC 414417. Online at the Internet Archive.
- G. Montbard. The Case of John Bull in Egypt, The Transvaal, Venezuela and Elsewhere. London: Hutchinson, [1896]. OCLC 11641786. Online at the Internet Archive.
