= Brenne (river) =

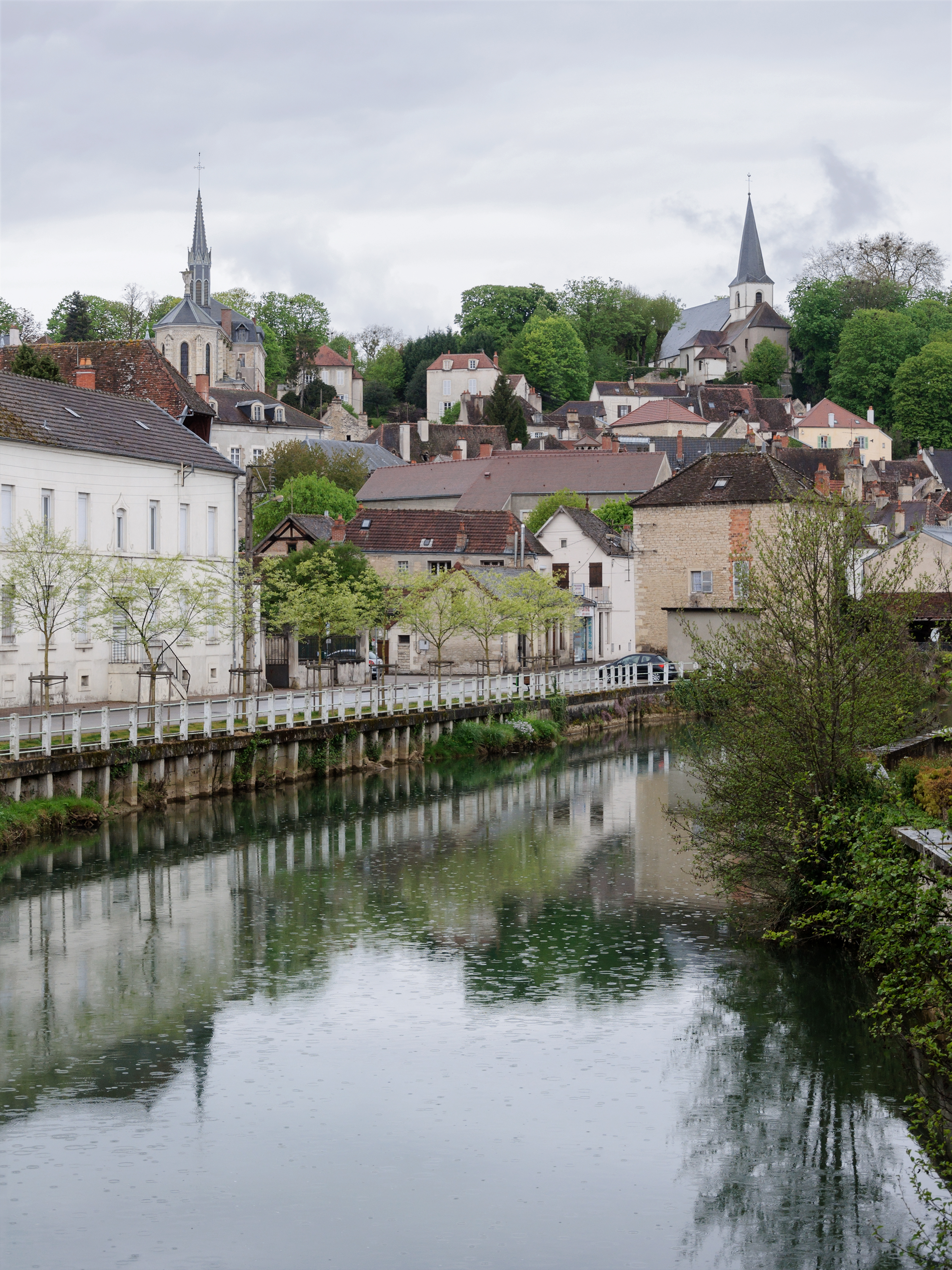
- The Brenne at Montbard

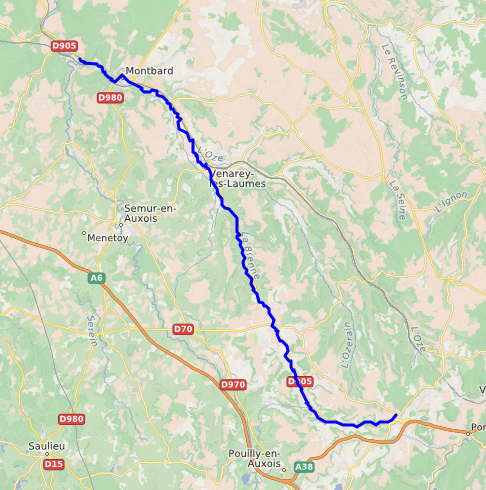

Location
- Country: France

Physical characteristics
- Source
  - location: Sombernon, Côte-d'Or
  - coordinates: 47°18′50″N 4°42′36″E
  - elevation: 560 m (1,840 ft)
- Mouth
  - location: Armançon
  - coordinates: 47°38′38″N 4°16′34″E
  - elevation: 200 m (660 ft)
- Length: 71.7 km (44.6 mi)
- Basin size: 491 km²
- Discharge
  - average: 8.19 m³/s

Basin features
- Progression: Armançon→ Yonne→ Seine→ English Channel
- Tributaries
  - right: Ozerain

The Brenne (French pronunciation: [bʁɛn]) is a 71.7-kilometre (44.6 mi) river in Côte-d'Or in Bourgogne, eastern France. It rises in Sombernon and flows generally northwest to join the Armançon at Buffon, 6 kilometres (4 mi) downstream from Montbard.

== Course and Settlements ==
Along its course, the Brenne flows through or near several notable communes, including:

- Sombernon
- Aubigny-lès-Sombernon
- Grosbois-en-Montagne
- Vitteaux
- Pouillenay
- Venarey-les-Laumes
- Montbard
