= Godefroy Durand =

French illustrator and draughtsman

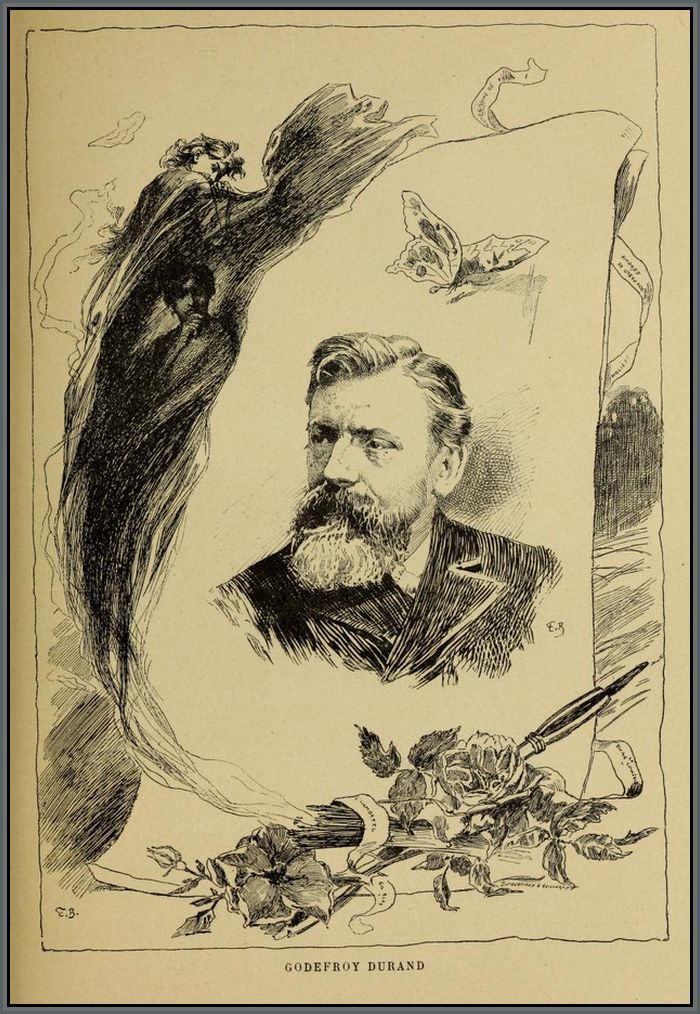
- Godefroy Durand by Émile Bayard
- Born: Düsseldorf
- Died: 27 September 1896 (aged 63–64); Paris
- Known for: Illustration

Godefroy Durand (1832, Düsseldorf – 27 September 1896, Paris) was a German-born French illustrator and draughtsman, who worked in both France and Great Britain.

== Life ==
Durand was born in Düsseldorf to French parents. He trained in Paris under the painter Léon Cogniet, and then worked in Paris in the 1860s for many of the leading French illustrated newspapers of the time, including L'Univers Illustré, L'Illustration (1864), Le Monde Illustré (1870) and Le Journal Illustré. He also had work published in the Illustrated News of the World in 1859. He moved permanently to London in 1869 to take up full-time illustrative work for the newly established illustrated weekly newspaper The Graphic, where he became a "special artist." The obituary by his former employer noted how he had been with the British newspaper "from its inception" on 4 December 1869 for several decades until the 1890s. He exhibited Un Coup de Canon (1870) at the Suffolk Street Gallery, London in a mixed 'Exhibition for the Benefit of the Distressed Peasantry of France' held to raise funds for those affected by the Franco-Prussian War of 1870–71. His watercolour Siege of Paris, 1871 Montmartre during the sortie of January 19th was shown at the Royal Society of British Artists in London in 1873. One of his Franco-Prussian War illustrations was republished in the newly launched Belgian weekly newspaper L'Illustration Européenne in 1870. He died in Paris in 1896.

== Works ==
Drawings by Durand are held by the Royal Collection and the William Morris Gallery, London.

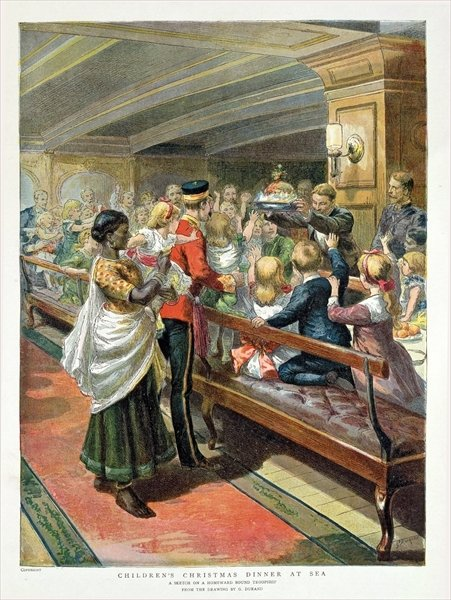
Children's Christmas Dinner at Sea, 1889

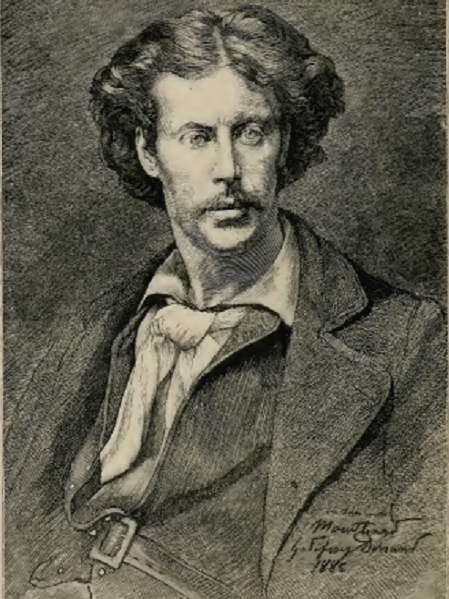
Georges Montbard, 1886

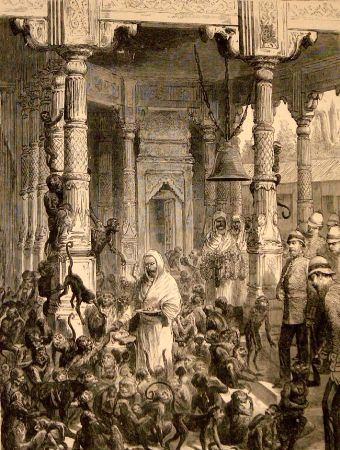
The Prince of Wales visiting the Monkey Temple, Benares, 1876

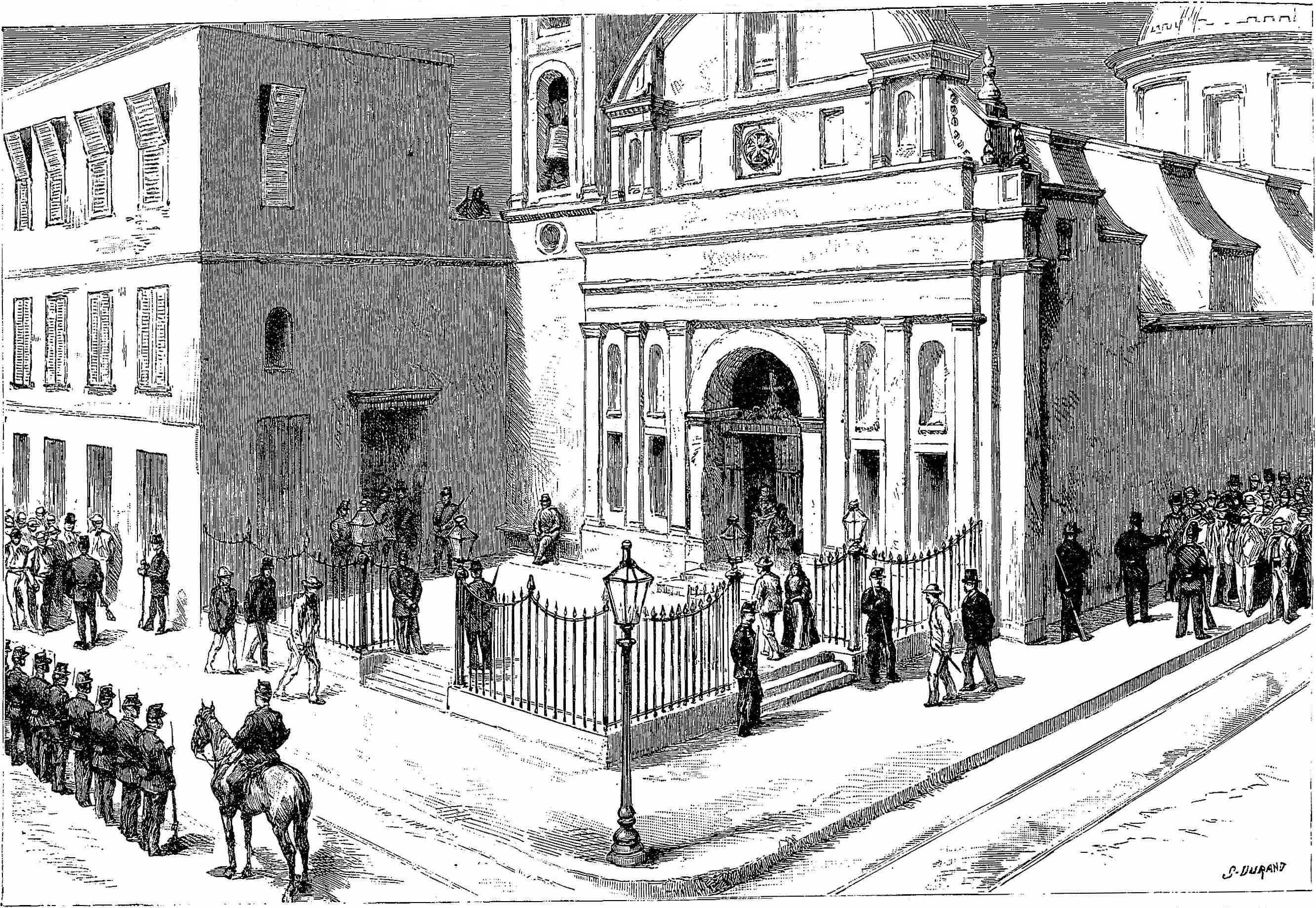
The Presidential Election in Argentina, the Polling-Station at the Church of La Merced, Buenos Ayres, 1892

Whitehall

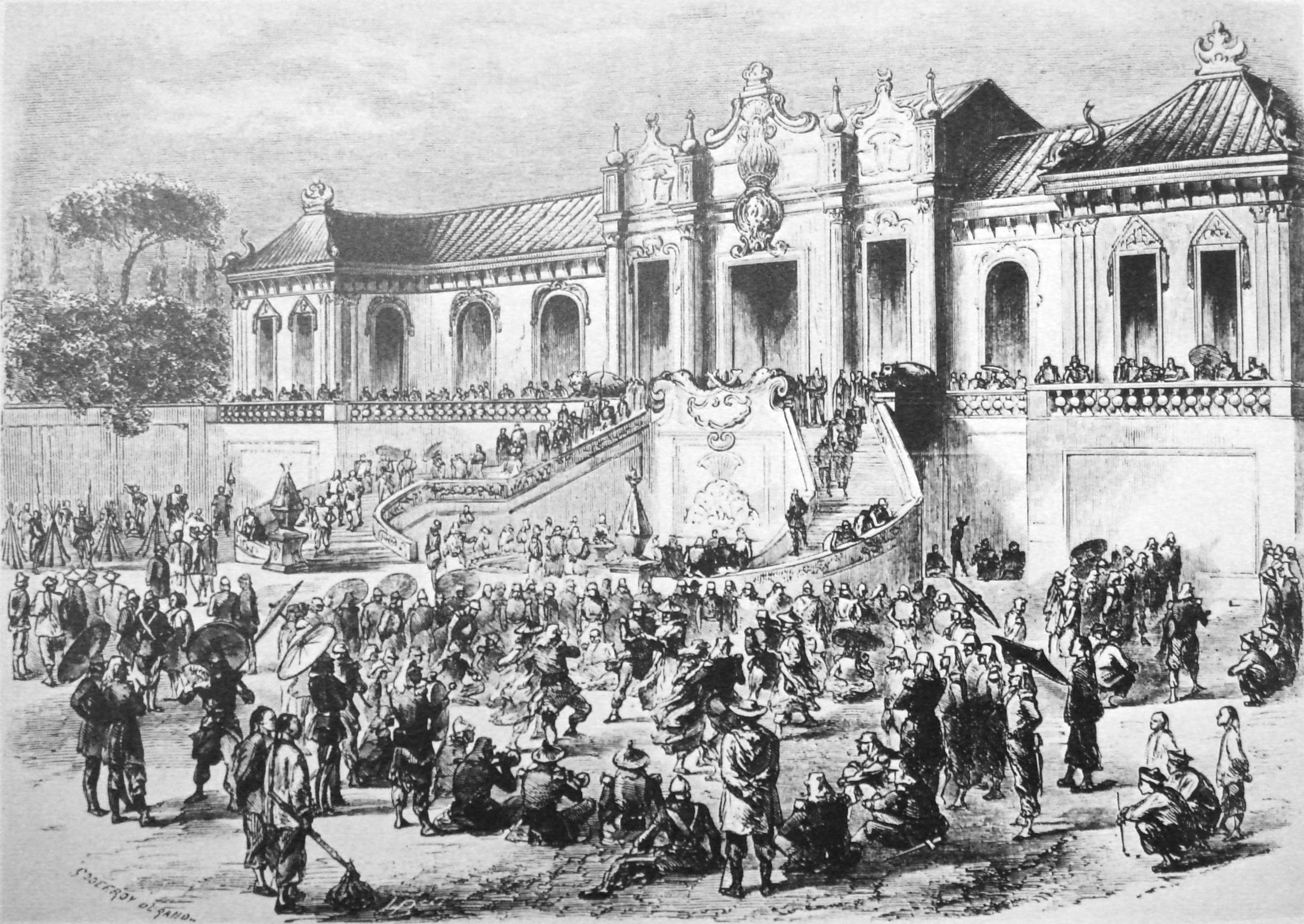
Looting of the Yuan Ming Yuan by Anglo French forces, 1860
