= Saffres =

- Commune
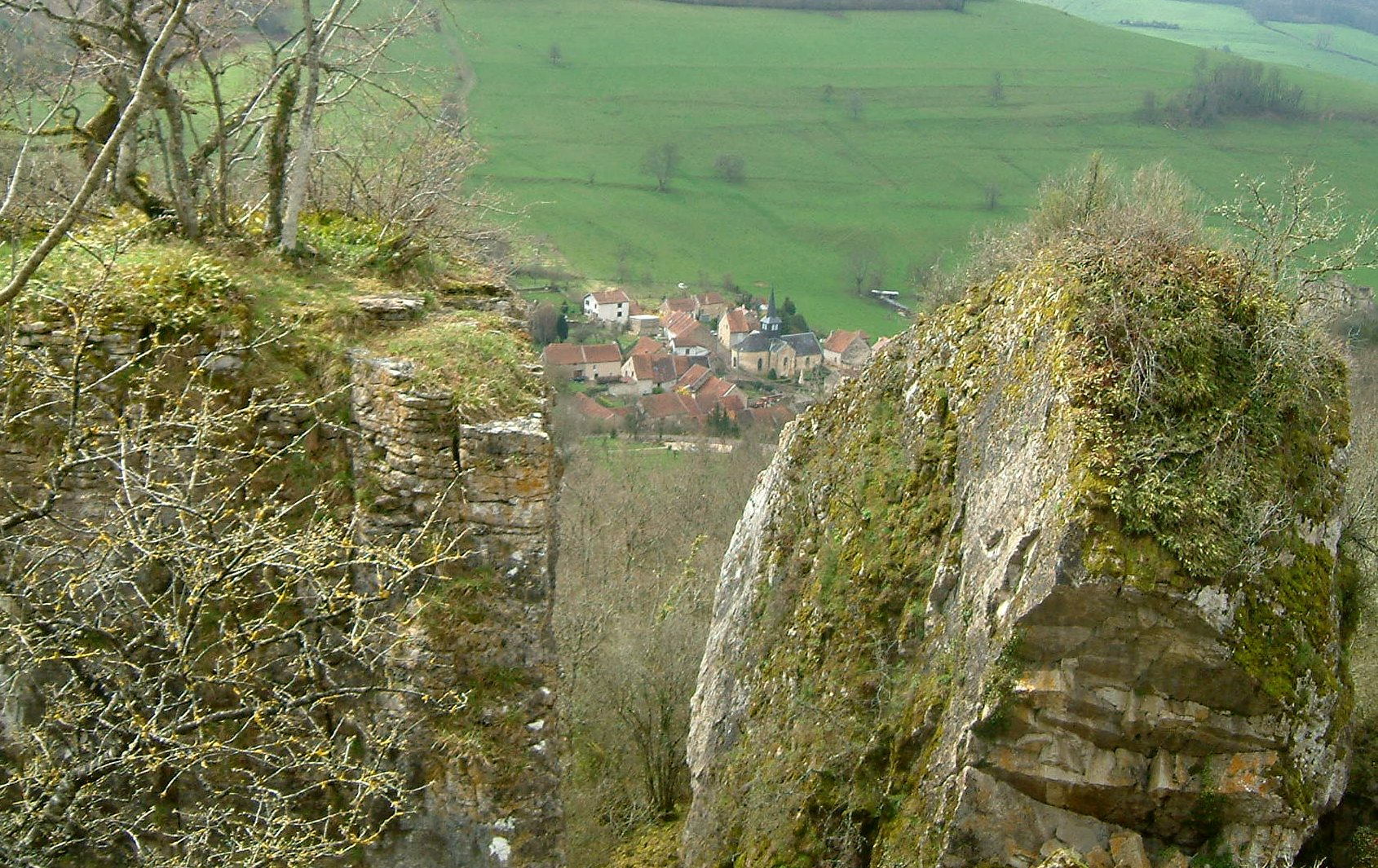
- A general view of Saffres
- Location of Saffres
- Location within France Location within Bourgogne-Franche-Comté
- Coordinates: 47°22′09″N 4°34′46″E
- Country: France
- Region: Bourgogne-Franche-Comté
- Department: Côte-d'Or
- Arrondissement: Montbard
- Canton: Semur-en-Auxois
- Intercommunality: Terres d'Auxois

Government
  - Mayor (2020–2026): Patricia Nore
- Area^{1}: 12.43 km^{2} (4.80 sq mi)
- Elevation: 370 m (1,210 ft)
- Highest elevation: 542 m (1,778 ft)
- Lowest elevation: 328 m (1,076 ft)
- Population (2023): 119
  - Density: 9.57/km^{2} (24.8/sq mi)
- Time zone: UTC+01:00 (CET)
  - Summer (DST): UTC+02:00 (CEST)
- INSEE/Postal code: 21537 /21350
- ^{1} French Land Register data, which excludes lakes, ponds, glaciers > 1 km^{2} (0.386 sq mi or 247 acres) and river estuaries.

Saffres (French pronunciation: [safʁ]) is a commune in the Côte-d'Or department in eastern France.

== Population ==
Historical population
| Year | Pop. | ±% p.a. |
|---|---|---|
| 1968 | 122 | — |
| 1975 | 98 | −3.08% |
| 1982 | 113 | +2.06% |
| 1990 | 115 | +0.22% |
| 1999 | 105 | −1.01% |
| 2007 | 119 | +1.58% |
| 2012 | 128 | +1.47% |
| 2017 | 115 | −2.12% |
| 2023 | 119 | +0.57% |
Source: INSEE

== See also ==
- Communes of the Côte-d'Or department
