= Villy-en-Auxois =

- Commune
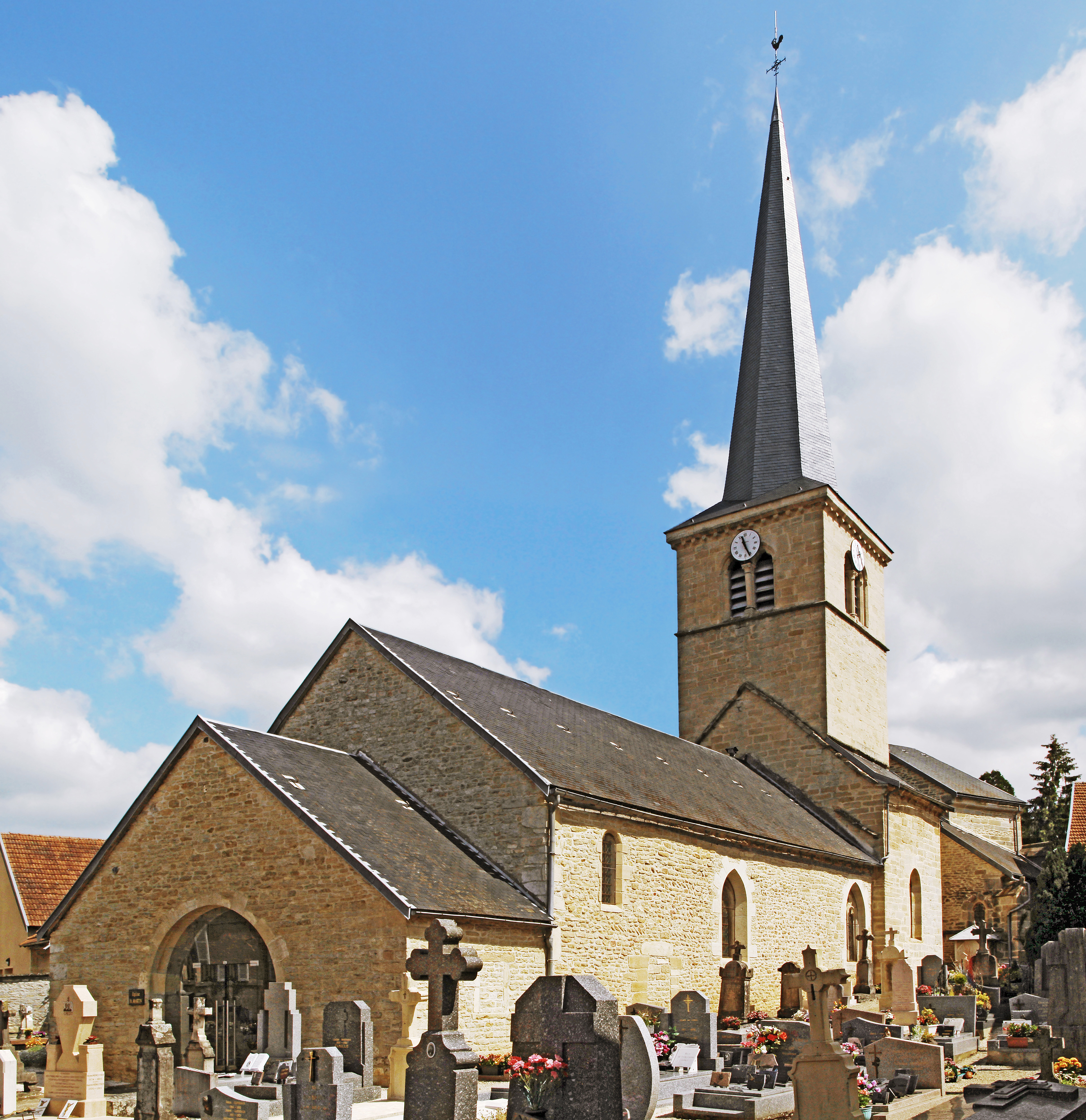
- The church in Villy-en-Auxois

- Coat of arms
- Location of Villy-en-Auxois
- Location within France Location within Bourgogne-Franche-Comté
- Coordinates: 47°25′16″N 4°38′08″E
- Country: France
- Region: Bourgogne-Franche-Comté
- Department: Côte-d'Or
- Arrondissement: Montbard
- Canton: Semur-en-Auxois

Government
  - Mayor (2020–2026): Evelyne Monot
- Area^{1}: 16.17 km^{2} (6.24 sq mi)
- Elevation: 340 m (1,120 ft)
- Highest elevation: 511 m (1,677 ft)
- Lowest elevation: 318 m (1,043 ft)
- Population (2023): 233
  - Density: 14.4/km^{2} (37.3/sq mi)
- Time zone: UTC+01:00 (CET)
  - Summer (DST): UTC+02:00 (CEST)
- INSEE/Postal code: 21707 /21350
- ^{1} French Land Register data, which excludes lakes, ponds, glaciers > 1 km^{2} (0.386 sq mi or 247 acres) and river estuaries.

Villy-en-Auxois is a commune in the Côte-d'Or department in eastern France.

== Population ==
Historical population
| Year | Pop. | ±% p.a. |
|---|---|---|
| 1968 | 370 | — |
| 1975 | 348 | −0.87% |
| 1982 | 281 | −3.01% |
| 1990 | 277 | −0.18% |
| 1999 | 209 | −3.08% |
| 2007 | 243 | +1.90% |
| 2012 | 226 | −1.44% |
| 2017 | 218 | −0.72% |
| 2023 | 233 | +1.12% |
Source: INSEE

== See also ==
- Communes of the Côte-d'Or department
