= Pouilly-en-Auxois =

- Commune
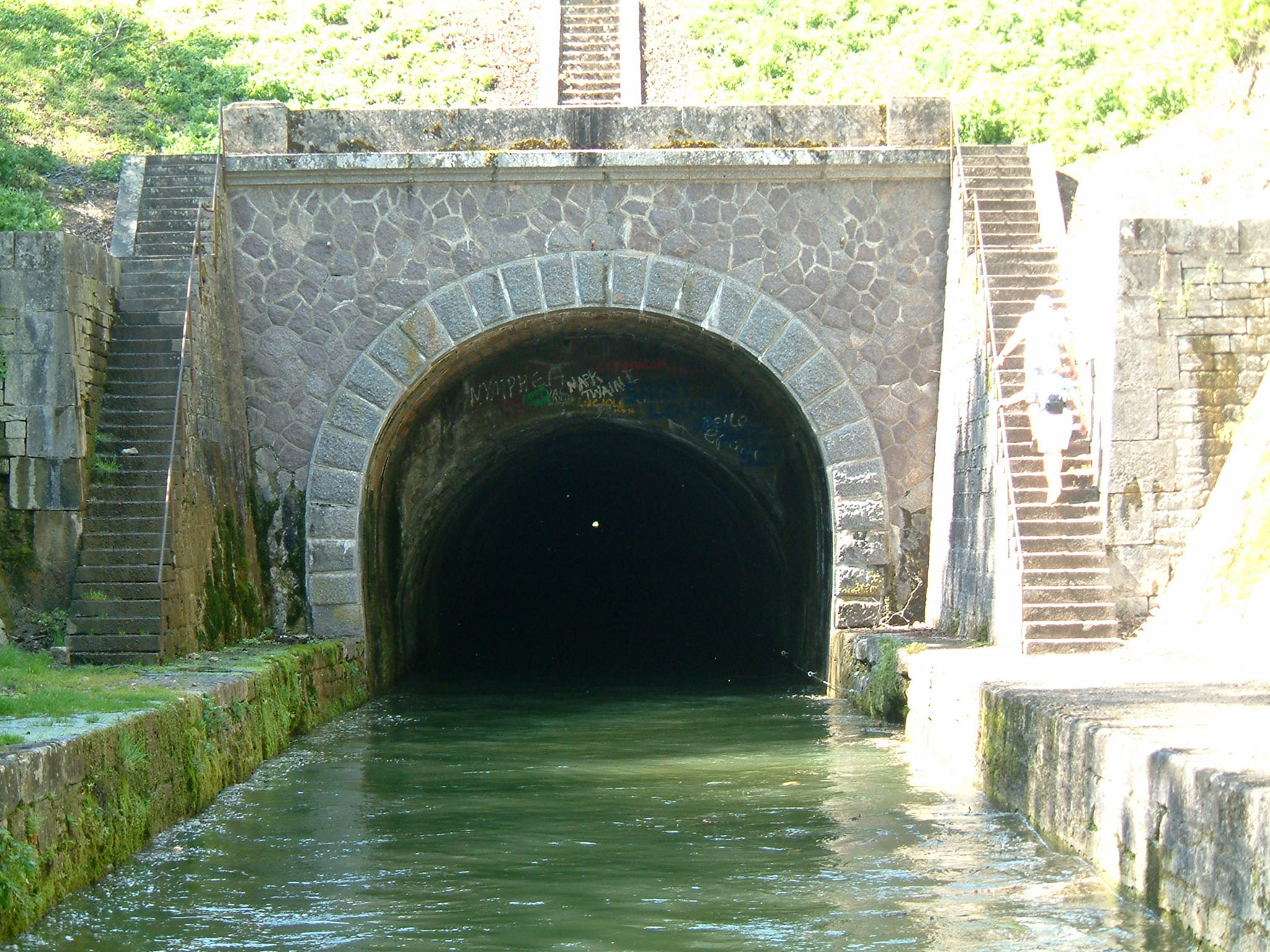
- Canal of Burgundy tunnel

- Coat of arms
- Location of Pouilly-en-Auxois
- Location within France Location within Bourgogne-Franche-Comté
- Coordinates: 47°15′48″N 4°33′23″E
- Country: France
- Region: Bourgogne-Franche-Comté
- Department: Côte-d'Or
- Arrondissement: Beaune
- Canton: Arnay-le-Duc

Government
  - Mayor (2020–2026): Éric Piesvaux
- Area^{1}: 10.12 km^{2} (3.91 sq mi)
- Elevation: 384 m (1,260 ft)
- Highest elevation: 560 m (1,840 ft)
- Lowest elevation: 369 m (1,211 ft)
- Population (2023): 1,533
  - Density: 151.5/km^{2} (392.3/sq mi)
- Time zone: UTC+01:00 (CET)
  - Summer (DST): UTC+02:00 (CEST)
- INSEE/Postal code: 21501 /21320
- ^{1} French Land Register data, which excludes lakes, ponds, glaciers > 1 km^{2} (0.386 sq mi or 247 acres) and river estuaries.

Pouilly-en-Auxois (French pronunciation: [puji ɑ̃.n‿o(k)swa], lit. 'Pouilly in Auxois') is a commune in the Côte-d'Or department in eastern France.

It is the summit of the Canal of Burgundy, which passes in a tunnel under the town.

== Geography ==
The town was originally sited on the St Pierre hilltop surrounding a (now vanished) castle and walls built by the Dukes of Burgundy and the 13th/14th century Chapelle de Notre Dame Trouvée (Chapel of Our Lady Found). Beginning in the 16th century the town was rebuilt further down in the valley and in 1868 the new St Pierre church was built in what is now the city center.

=== Climate ===
Pouilly-en-Auxois has an oceanic climate (Köppen climate classification Cfb). The average annual temperature in Pouilly-en-Auxois is 10.5 °C (50.9 °F). The average annual rainfall is 872.3 mm (34.34 in) with November as the wettest month. The temperatures are highest on average in July, at around 19.1 °C (66.4 °F), and lowest in January, at around 2.4 °C (36.3 °F). The highest temperature ever recorded in Pouilly-en-Auxois was 39.2 °C (102.6 °F) on 12 August 2003; the coldest temperature ever recorded was −18.2 °C (−0.8 °F) on 20 December 2009.

Climate data for Pouilly-en-Auxois (1981–2010 averages, extremes 1991−present)
Month	Jan	Feb	Mar	Apr	May	Jun	Jul	Aug	Sep	Oct	Nov	Dec	Year
Record high °C (°F)	18.6 (65.5)	22.8 (73.0)	24.0 (75.2)	27.2 (81.0)	30.5 (86.9)	37.8 (100.0)	39.1 (102.4)	39.2 (102.6)	33.4 (92.1)	26.9 (80.4)	21.3 (70.3)	15.7 (60.3)	39.2 (102.6)
Mean daily maximum °C (°F)	5.4 (41.7)	7.1 (44.8)	11.1 (52.0)	14.6 (58.3)	19.0 (66.2)	22.5 (72.5)	24.9 (76.8)	24.7 (76.5)	20.0 (68.0)	15.3 (59.5)	9.2 (48.6)	5.6 (42.1)	15.0 (59.0)
Daily mean °C (°F)	2.4 (36.3)	3.4 (38.1)	6.6 (43.9)	9.5 (49.1)	13.8 (56.8)	17.0 (62.6)	19.1 (66.4)	19.0 (66.2)	14.8 (58.6)	11.0 (51.8)	5.9 (42.6)	2.8 (37.0)	10.5 (50.9)
Mean daily minimum °C (°F)	−0.7 (30.7)	−0.3 (31.5)	2.0 (35.6)	4.3 (39.7)	8.5 (47.3)	11.5 (52.7)	13.4 (56.1)	13.2 (55.8)	9.7 (49.5)	6.7 (44.1)	2.6 (36.7)	0.0 (32.0)	5.9 (42.6)
Record low °C (°F)	−13.7 (7.3)	−14.5 (5.9)	−15.2 (4.6)	−4.8 (23.4)	−0.7 (30.7)	1.3 (34.3)	5.2 (41.4)	4.3 (39.7)	−0.7 (30.7)	−5.8 (21.6)	−10.7 (12.7)	−18.2 (−0.8)	−18.2 (−0.8)
Average precipitation mm (inches)	70.5 (2.78)	55.5 (2.19)	59.3 (2.33)	69.5 (2.74)	83.5 (3.29)	71.9 (2.83)	75.0 (2.95)	68.5 (2.70)	73.0 (2.87)	83.3 (3.28)	89.0 (3.50)	73.3 (2.89)	872.3 (34.34)
Average precipitation days (≥ 1.0 mm)	12.2	10.8	10.9	11.2	12.0	9.7	10.0	9.6	9.7	11.6	13.4	13.2	134.1
Source: Meteociel

== Population ==
Historical population
Year	Pop.	±% p.a.
1968	1,136	—
1975	1,198	+0.76%
1982	1,396	+2.21%
1990	1,372	−0.22%
1999	1,502	+1.01%
2007	1,474	−0.23%
2012	1,555	+1.08%
2017	1,481	−0.97%
2023	1,533	+0.58%
Source: INSEE

== Economy ==
From the twelfth century, the town was a regional agricultural center, specializing in wheat and later hemp, oils, skins, wool and sheep.

== Sights ==
The town features three dovecotes dating from the 15th century, the interior walls of which contain around 1,200 pigeonholes. Running beneath the town is la Voûte, a tunnel through which passes the Burgundy canal. It was built in the late 19th century to accommodate barge traffic in lieu of installing frequent locks on the canal. The office of tourism located at the port offers a trip through this 3.3 km tunnel on a boat called the Billebaude. Above the town is a statue of the Madonna, from where the visitor can gain a bird's eye view of the town and canal. In addition, a 12th-century chapel near the cemetery at the edge of town is all that remains of the old town. It is closed for renovation.

== See also ==
- Communes of the Côte-d'Or department
