= Montbard =

- Subprefecture and commune
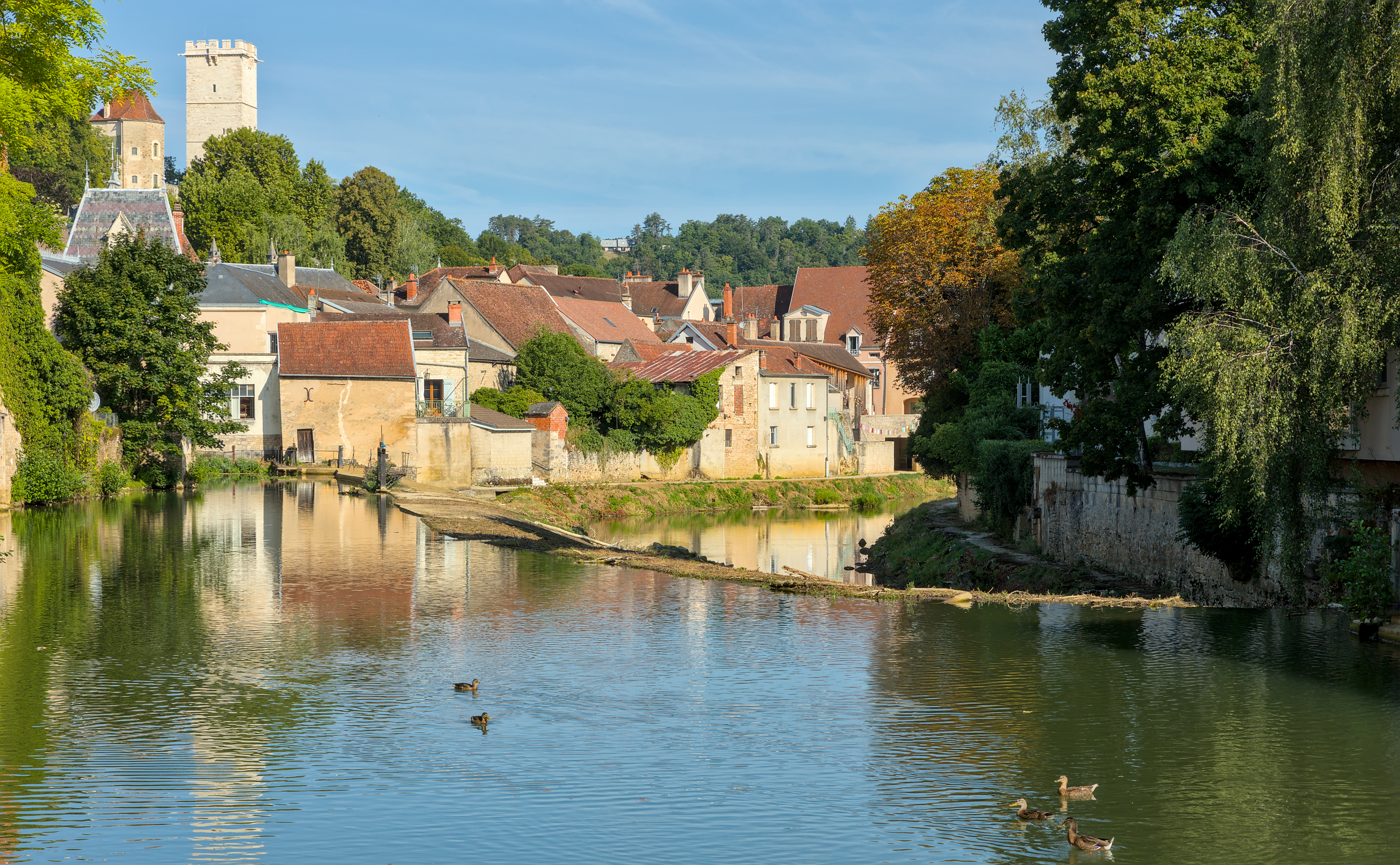
- Brenne river

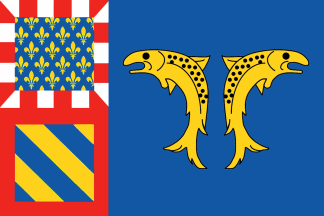
- Flag Coat of arms
- Location of Montbard
- Location within France Location within Bourgogne-Franche-Comté
- Coordinates: 47°37′25″N 4°20′16″E
- Country: France
- Region: Bourgogne-Franche-Comté
- Department: Côte-d'Or
- Arrondissement: Montbard
- Canton: Montbard

Government
  - Mayor (2020–2026): Laurence Porte
- Area^{1}: 46.37 km^{2} (17.90 sq mi)
- Elevation: 221 m (725 ft)
- Highest elevation: 366 m (1,201 ft)
- Lowest elevation: 202 m (663 ft)
- Population (2023): 4,639
  - Density: 100.0/km^{2} (259.1/sq mi)
- Time zone: UTC+01:00 (CET)
  - Summer (DST): UTC+02:00 (CEST)
- INSEE/Postal code: 21425 /21500
- ^{1} French Land Register data, which excludes lakes, ponds, glaciers > 1 km^{2} (0.386 sq mi or 247 acres) and river estuaries.

Montbard (French pronunciation: [mɔ̃baʁ]) is a commune and subprefecture of the Côte-d'Or department in the Bourgogne-Franche-Comté region in eastern France.

Montbard is a small industrial town on the river Brenne. The Forges de Buffon, ironworks established by Buffon, are located in the nearby village of Buffon. There has been a cricket team in the town since 1993.

== History ==
Montbard is near the site of the Cistercian Abbey of Fontenay, which became a UNESCO World Heritage Site in 1981.

The chateau was the scene of the marriage of Anne de Bourgogne and John of Lancaster, Duke of Bedford in 1423. It was acquired by the naturalist Georges-Louis Leclerc, Comte de Buffon, who was born in Montbard in 1707.

== Geography ==
=== Climate ===
Montbard has an oceanic climate (Köppen climate classification Cfb). The average annual temperature in Montbard is 11.2 °C (52.2 °F). The average annual rainfall is 836.7 mm (32.94 in) with May as the wettest month. The temperatures are highest on average in July, at around 19.6 °C (67.3 °F), and lowest in January, at around 3.6 °C (38.5 °F). The highest temperature ever recorded in Montbard was 40.7 °C (105.3 °F) on 25 July 2019; the coldest temperature ever recorded was −16.7 °C (1.9 °F) on 20 December 2009.

Climate data for Montbard (1992–2020 normals, extremes 1992–present)
Month	Jan	Feb	Mar	Apr	May	Jun	Jul	Aug	Sep	Oct	Nov	Dec	Year
Record high °C (°F)	17.9 (64.2)	23.5 (74.3)	26.4 (79.5)	29.1 (84.4)	32.4 (90.3)	38.5 (101.3)	40.7 (105.3)	40.5 (104.9)	35.9 (96.6)	32.4 (90.3)	24.0 (75.2)	18.6 (65.5)	40.7 (105.3)
Mean daily maximum °C (°F)	7.2 (45.0)	8.6 (47.5)	12.7 (54.9)	16.5 (61.7)	20.2 (68.4)	24.2 (75.6)	26.3 (79.3)	26.1 (79.0)	21.7 (71.1)	16.9 (62.4)	11.1 (52.0)	7.7 (45.9)	16.6 (61.9)
Daily mean °C (°F)	3.8 (38.8)	4.5 (40.1)	7.3 (45.1)	10.4 (50.7)	14.3 (57.7)	17.9 (64.2)	19.9 (67.8)	19.6 (67.3)	15.7 (60.3)	12.1 (53.8)	7.3 (45.1)	4.5 (40.1)	11.4 (52.5)
Mean daily minimum °C (°F)	0.5 (32.9)	0.4 (32.7)	1.9 (35.4)	4.3 (39.7)	8.3 (46.9)	11.7 (53.1)	13.4 (56.1)	13.1 (55.6)	9.7 (49.5)	7.2 (45.0)	3.4 (38.1)	1.2 (34.2)	6.3 (43.3)
Record low °C (°F)	−15.7 (3.7)	−14.5 (5.9)	−14.6 (5.7)	−6.7 (19.9)	−1.3 (29.7)	1.8 (35.2)	5.9 (42.6)	3.7 (38.7)	0.3 (32.5)	−6.9 (19.6)	−10.6 (12.9)	−16.7 (1.9)	−16.7 (1.9)
Average precipitation mm (inches)	71.8 (2.83)	62.6 (2.46)	64.8 (2.55)	68.2 (2.69)	79.1 (3.11)	64.9 (2.56)	70.2 (2.76)	58.4 (2.30)	70.2 (2.76)	81.0 (3.19)	80.8 (3.18)	81.5 (3.21)	853.5 (33.60)
Average precipitation days (≥ 1.0 mm)	12.4	11.3	10.8	10.4	11.4	9.6	8.9	8.5	9.4	11.4	12.7	13.5	130.3
Source: Meteociel

== Population ==
Historical population

Year	Pop.	±% p.a.
1793	2,316	—
1800	2,118	−1.27%
1806	2,061	−0.45%
1821	1,875	−0.63%
1836	2,123	+0.83%
1841	2,215	+0.85%
1846	2,315	+0.89%
1851	2,697	+3.10%
1856	2,428	−2.08%
1861	2,617	+1.51%
1866	2,713	+0.72%
1872	2,628	−0.53%
1876	2,653	+0.24%
1881	2,607	−0.35%
1886	2,571	−0.28%
1891	2,509	−0.49%
1896	2,653	+1.12%
1901	3,632	+6.48%

Year	Pop.	±% p.a.
1906	3,824	+1.04%
1911	3,957	+0.69%
1921	4,863	+2.08%
1926	4,193	−2.92%
1931	4,423	+1.07%
1936	4,097	−1.52%
1946	4,455	+0.84%
1954	4,871	+1.12%
1962	6,386	+3.44%
1968	7,050	+1.66%
1975	7,513	+0.91%
1982	7,707	+0.36%
1990	7,108	−1.01%
1999	6,300	−1.33%
2007	5,582	−1.50%
2012	5,437	−0.53%
2017	5,160	−1.04%
2023	4,639	−1.76%

Source: EHESS and INSEE (1968-2023)

== Attractions ==
- Abbey of Fontenay

== Transportation ==
Some TGV express trains between Paris and Dijon and several regional trains stop at Montbard station.

The Burgundy Canal also passes through the town.

== Personalities ==
=== Births ===
Montbard was the birthplace of:

- Jean Bardin (1732–1809), historical painter
- Pierre Daubenton (1703–1776), lawyer, politician, author and Encyclopédiste
- Georges-Louis Leclerc, Comte de Buffon (1707–1788), naturalist and mathematician
- Louis-Jean-Marie Daubenton, (1716–1800), naturalist and collaborator of Buffon
- Benjamin Guérard (1797–1854), historian and librarian
- Eugène Guillaume (1822–1905), sculptor
- George Montbard (1841–1905), caricaturist and author

=== Deaths ===
- Jean-Andoche Junot (1771–1813), general during the First French Empire, committed suicide in Montbard
- Pierre Daubenton (see births)

== See also ==
- Communes of the Côte-d'Or department
