= Créancey =

- Commune
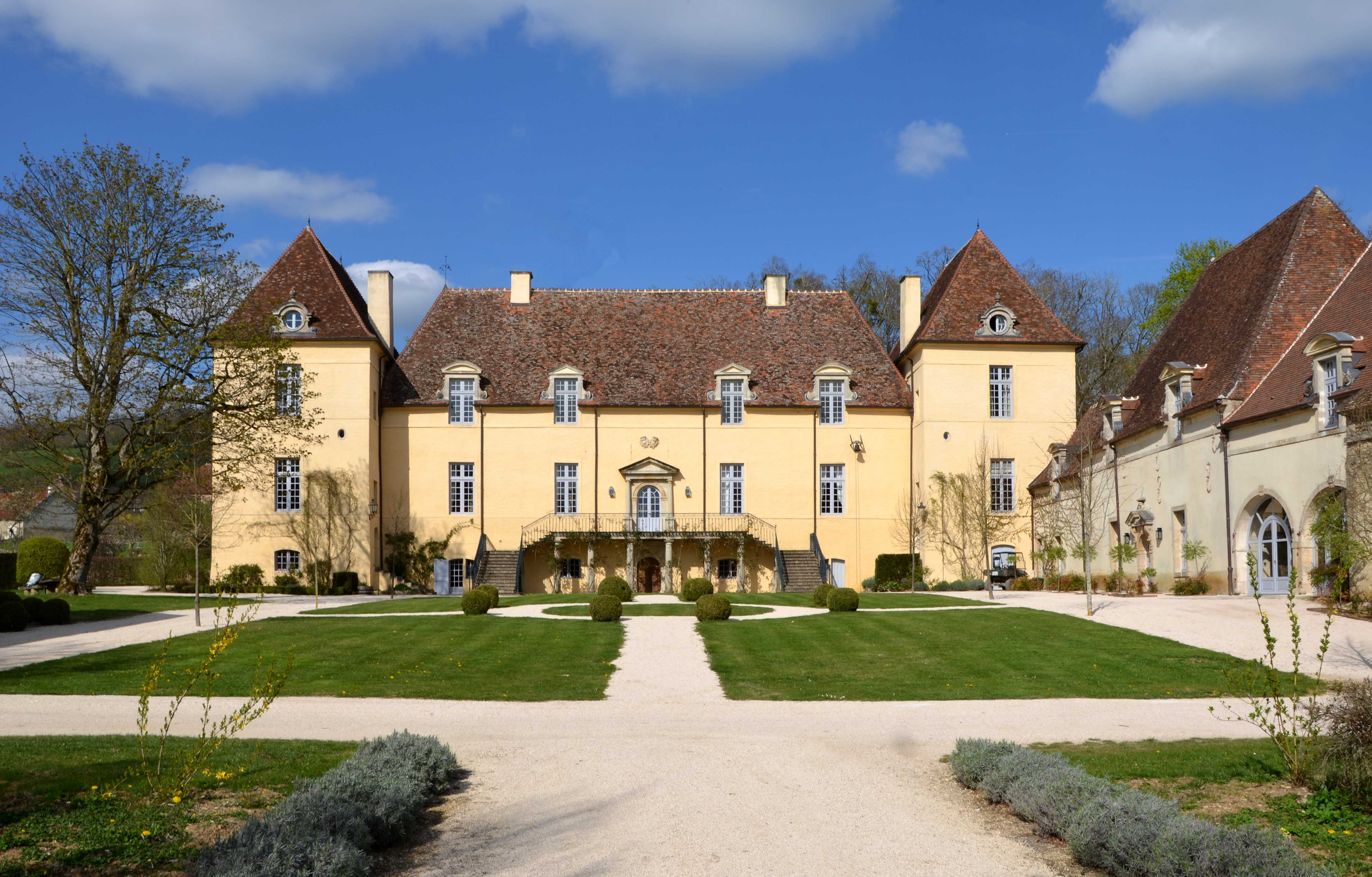
- Chateau

- Coat of arms
- Location of Créancey
- Location within France Location within Bourgogne-Franche-Comté
- Coordinates: 47°14′52″N 4°35′12″E
- Country: France
- Region: Bourgogne-Franche-Comté
- Department: Côte-d'Or
- Arrondissement: Beaune
- Canton: Arnay-le-Duc

Government
  - Mayor (2022–2026): Charline Desbois
- Area^{1}: 16.71 km^{2} (6.45 sq mi)
- Elevation: 398 m (1,306 ft)
- Highest elevation: 550 m (1,800 ft)
- Lowest elevation: 370 m (1,210 ft)
- Population (2023): 514
  - Density: 30.8/km^{2} (79.7/sq mi)
- Time zone: UTC+01:00 (CET)
  - Summer (DST): UTC+02:00 (CEST)
- INSEE/Postal code: 21210 /21320
- ^{1} French Land Register data, which excludes lakes, ponds, glaciers > 1 km^{2} (0.386 sq mi or 247 acres) and river estuaries.

Créancey (French pronunciation: [kʁeɑ̃sɛ]) is a commune in the Côte-d'Or department in eastern France.

== Population ==
Historical population
Year	Pop.	±% p.a.
1968	290	—
1975	294	+0.20%
1982	322	+1.31%
1990	334	+0.46%
1999	364	+0.96%
2007	505	+4.18%
2012	539	+1.31%
2017	528	−0.41%
2023	514	−0.45%
Source: INSEE

== See also ==
- Communes of the Côte-d'Or department
