= Civry-en-Montagne =

- Commune
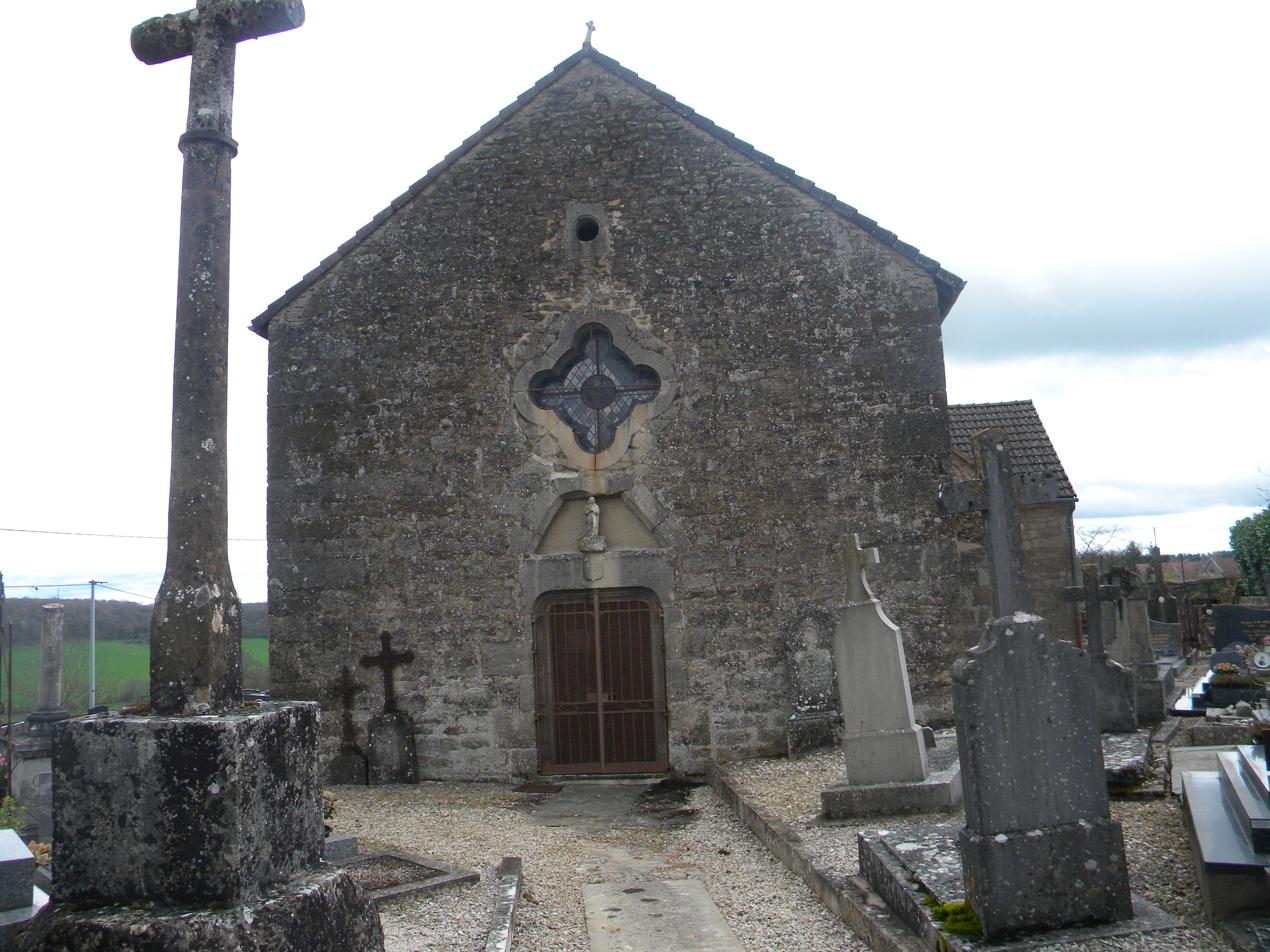
- The church in Civry
- Location of Civry-en-Montagne
- Location within France Location within Bourgogne-Franche-Comté
- Coordinates: 47°17′32″N 4°36′44″E
- Country: France
- Region: Bourgogne-Franche-Comté
- Department: Côte-d'Or
- Arrondissement: Beaune
- Canton: Arnay-le-Duc

Government
  - Mayor (2020–2026): Olivier Mouillon
- Area^{1}: 7.7 km^{2} (3.0 sq mi)
- Elevation: 545 m (1,788 ft)
- Highest elevation: 573 m (1,880 ft)
- Lowest elevation: 395 m (1,296 ft)
- Population (2023): 125
  - Density: 16/km^{2} (42/sq mi)
- Time zone: UTC+01:00 (CET)
  - Summer (DST): UTC+02:00 (CEST)
- INSEE/Postal code: 21176 /21320
- ^{1} French Land Register data, which excludes lakes, ponds, glaciers > 1 km^{2} (0.386 sq mi or 247 acres) and river estuaries.

Civry-en-Montagne (French pronunciation: [sivʁi ɑ̃ mɔ̃taɲ]) is a commune in the Côte-d'Or department in eastern France.

The parish church of St Mary Magdalene dates from the 15th century.

== Population ==
Historical population
Year	Pop.	±% p.a.
1968	79	—
1975	72	−1.32%
1982	68	−0.81%
1990	76	+1.40%
1999	73	−0.45%
2007	94	+3.21%
2012	108	+2.82%
2017	129	+3.62%
2023	125	−0.52%
Source: INSEE

== See also ==
- Communes of the Côte-d'Or department
