= Saint-Mesmin, Côte-d'Or =

Saint-Mesmin
- Commune
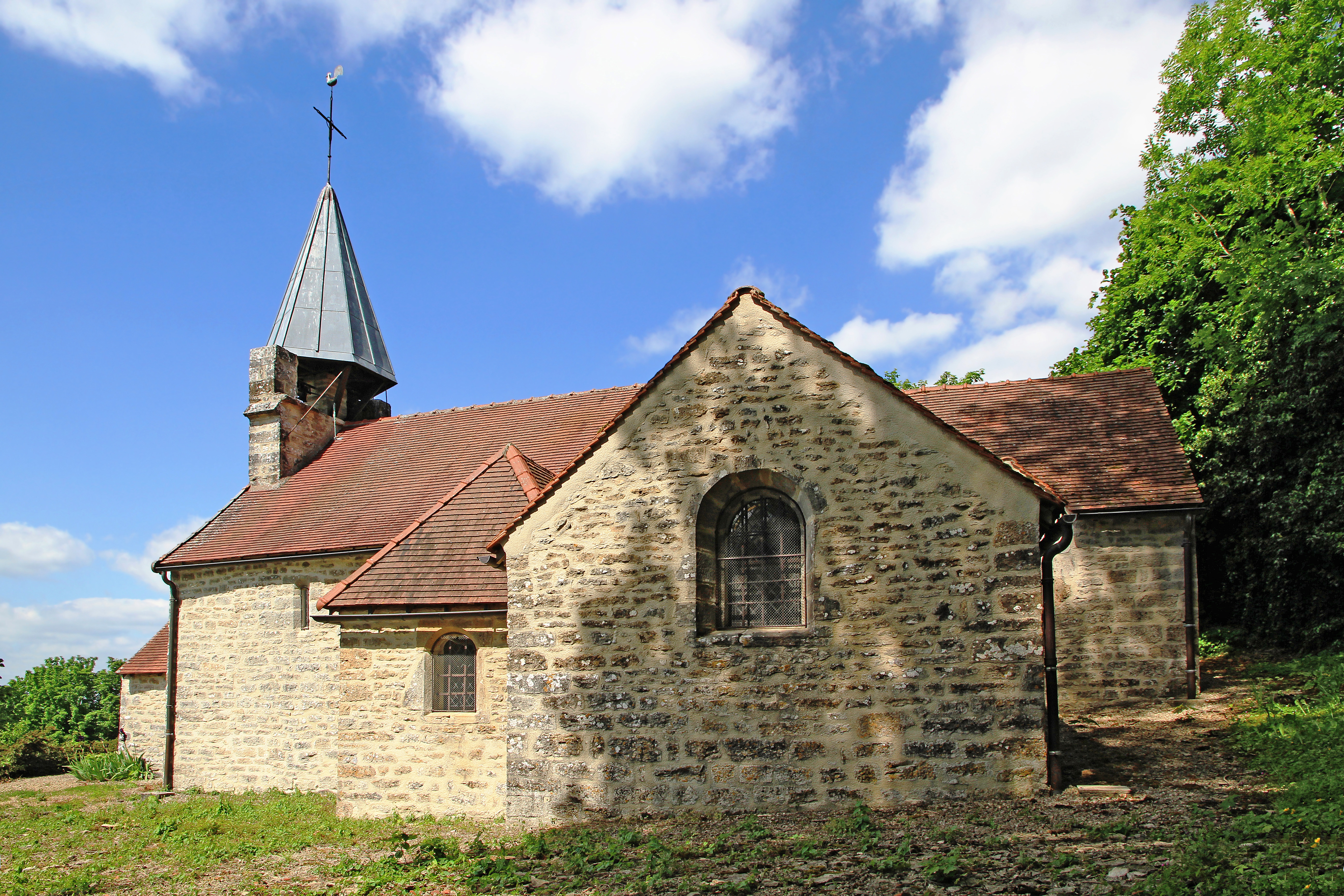
- The chapel of Fontette

- Coat of arms
- Location of Saint-Mesmin
- Location within France Location within Bourgogne-Franche-Comté
- Coordinates: 47°20′35″N 4°39′13″E
- Country: France
- Region: Bourgogne-Franche-Comté
- Department: Côte-d'Or
- Arrondissement: Montbard
- Canton: Semur-en-Auxois

Government
  - Mayor (2020–2026): Thierry Renault
- Area^{1}: 17.62 km^{2} (6.80 sq mi)
- Elevation: 490 m (1,610 ft)
- Highest elevation: 561 m (1,841 ft)
- Lowest elevation: 369 m (1,211 ft)
- Population (2023): 109
  - Density: 6.19/km^{2} (16.0/sq mi)
- Time zone: UTC+01:00 (CET)
  - Summer (DST): UTC+02:00 (CEST)
- INSEE/Postal code: 21563 /21540
- ^{1} French Land Register data, which excludes lakes, ponds, glaciers > 1 km^{2} (0.386 sq mi or 247 acres) and river estuaries.

Saint-Mesmin (French pronunciation: [sɛ̃ mɛmɛ̃]) is a commune in the Côte-d'Or department in eastern France.

== Population ==
Historical population
Year	Pop.	±% p.a.
1968	98	—
1975	94	−0.59%
1982	103	+1.31%
1990	88	−1.95%
1999	99	+1.32%
2007	119	+2.33%
2012	147	+4.32%
2017	128	−2.73%
2023	109	−2.64%
Source: INSEE

== See also ==
- Communes of the Côte-d'Or department
