= Grosbois-en-Montagne =

- Commune
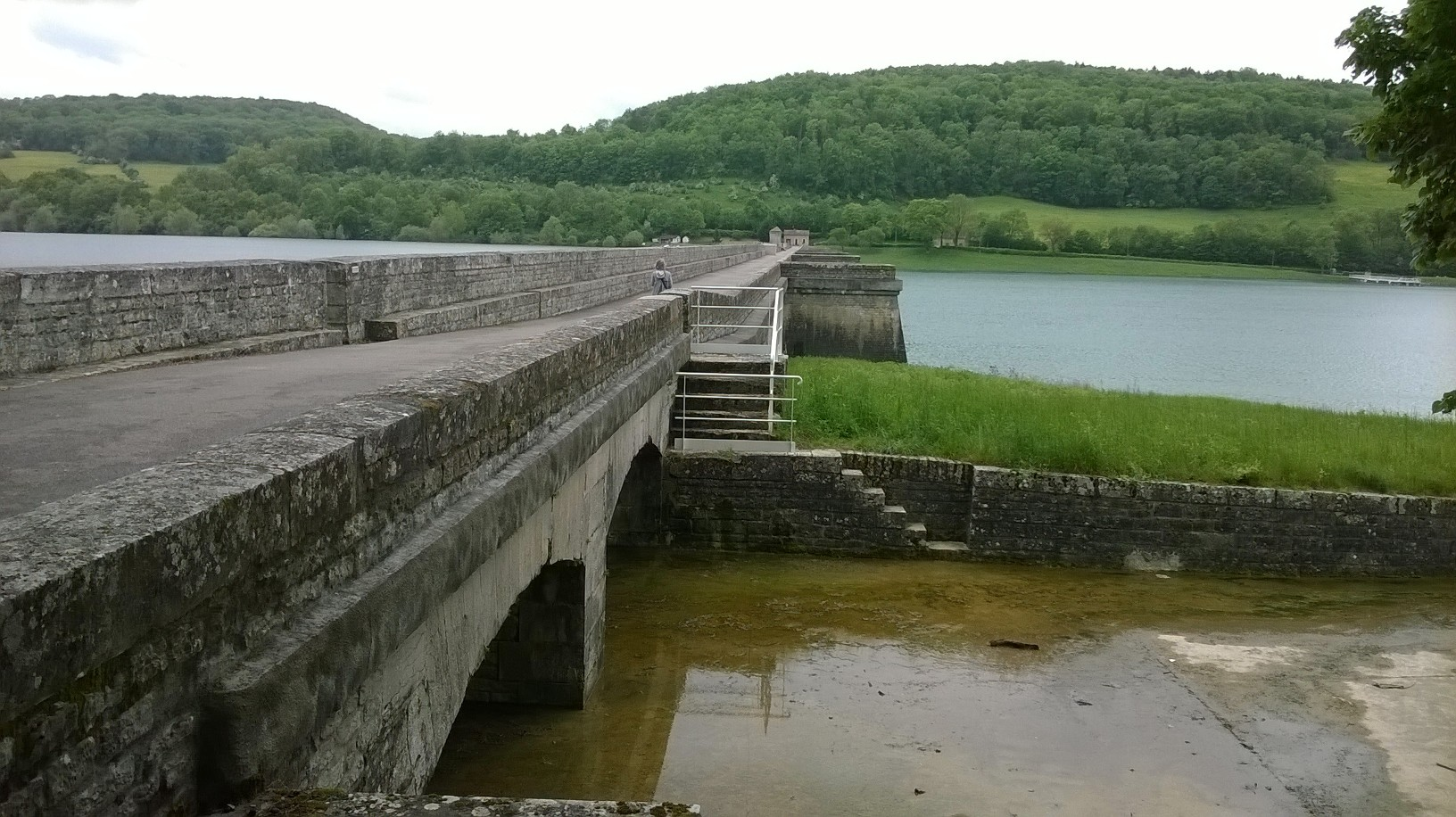
- Reservoir
- Location of Grosbois-en-Montagne
- Location within France Location within Bourgogne-Franche-Comté
- Coordinates: 47°19′14″N 4°35′50″E
- Country: France
- Region: Bourgogne-Franche-Comté
- Department: Côte-d'Or
- Arrondissement: Dijon
- Canton: Talant

Government
  - Mayor (2022–2026): Jean-Paul Boulere
- Area^{1}: 14.16 km^{2} (5.47 sq mi)
- Elevation: 350 m (1,150 ft)
- Highest elevation: 557 m (1,827 ft)
- Lowest elevation: 353 m (1,158 ft)
- Population (2023): 110
  - Density: 7.8/km^{2} (20/sq mi)
- Time zone: UTC+01:00 (CET)
  - Summer (DST): UTC+02:00 (CEST)
- INSEE/Postal code: 21310 /21540
- ^{1} French Land Register data, which excludes lakes, ponds, glaciers > 1 km^{2} (0.386 sq mi or 247 acres) and river estuaries.

Grosbois-en-Montagne (French pronunciation: [ɡʁobwa ɑ̃ mɔ̃taɲ]) is a commune in the Côte-d'Or department in eastern France.

== Population ==
Historical population
Year	Pop.	±% p.a.
1968	116	—
1975	107	−1.15%
1982	84	−3.40%
1990	73	−1.74%
1999	106	+4.23%
2007	110	+0.46%
2012	102	−1.50%
2017	108	+1.15%
2023	110	+0.31%
Source: INSEE

== See also ==
- Communes of the Côte-d'Or department
