= Sombernon =

- Commune
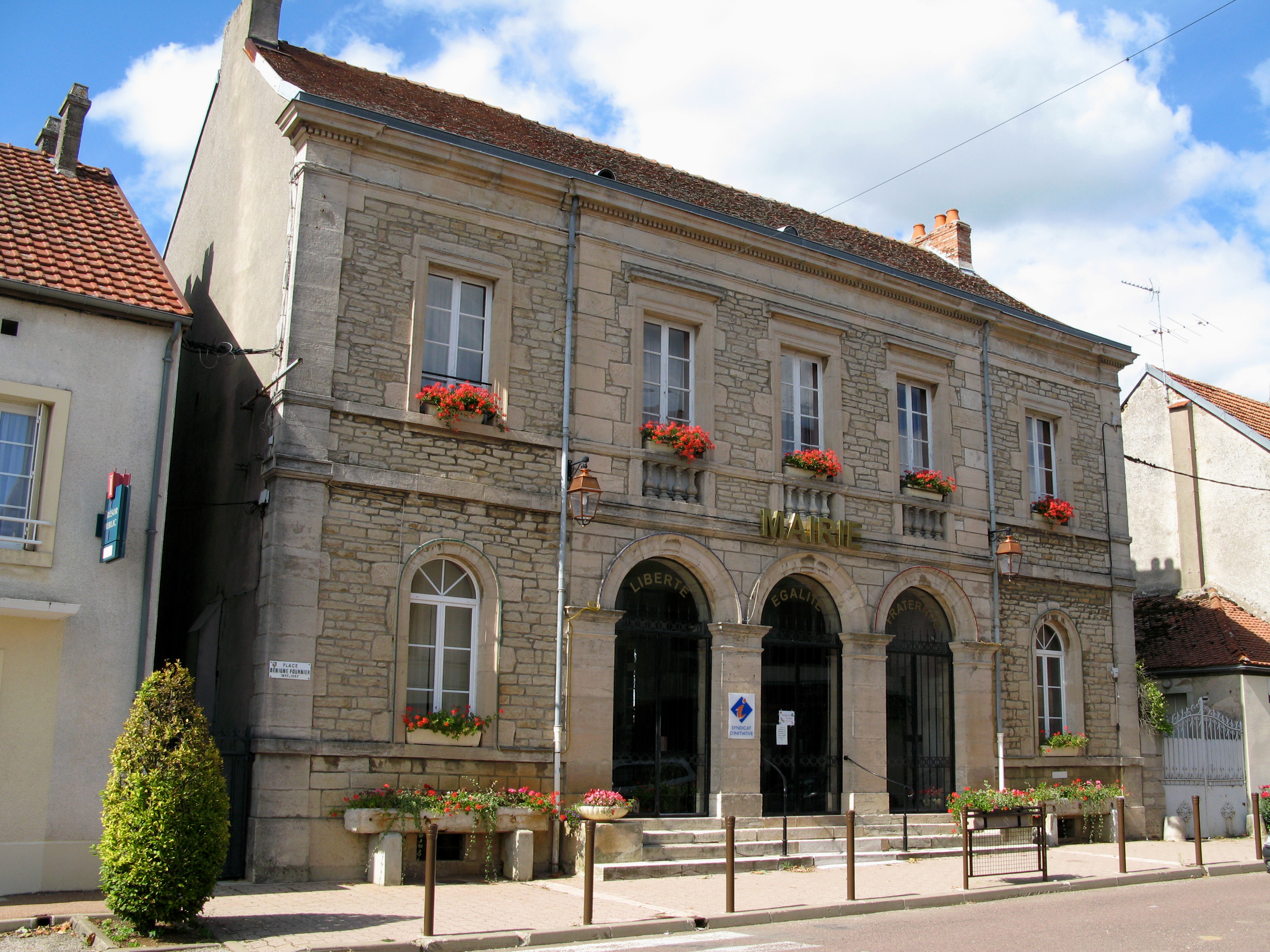
- Town hall

- Coat of arms
- Location of Sombernon
- Location within France Location within Bourgogne-Franche-Comté
- Coordinates: 47°18′31″N 4°42′30″E
- Country: France
- Region: Bourgogne-Franche-Comté
- Department: Côte-d'Or
- Arrondissement: Dijon
- Canton: Talant

Government
  - Mayor (2020–2026): Michel Roignot
- Area^{1}: 13.22 km^{2} (5.10 sq mi)
- Elevation: 556 m (1,824 ft)
- Highest elevation: 592 m (1,942 ft)
- Lowest elevation: 399 m (1,309 ft)
- Population (2023): 1,027
  - Density: 77.69/km^{2} (201.2/sq mi)
- Time zone: UTC+01:00 (CET)
  - Summer (DST): UTC+02:00 (CEST)
- INSEE/Postal code: 21611 /21540
- ^{1} French Land Register data, which excludes lakes, ponds, glaciers > 1 km^{2} (0.386 sq mi or 247 acres) and river estuaries.

Sombernon (French pronunciation: [sɔ̃bɛʁnɔ̃]) is a commune in the Côte-d'Or department in eastern France.

== Population ==
Historical population
Year	Pop.	±% p.a.
1968	561	—
1975	582	+0.53%
1982	713	+2.94%
1990	773	+1.02%
1999	778	+0.07%
2007	937	+2.35%
2012	964	+0.57%
2017	926	−0.80%
2023	1,027	+1.74%
Source: INSEE

== See also ==
- Communes of the Côte-d'Or department
