= European route E62 =

Road in trans-European E-road network

E62

Route information
- Length: 1,307 km (812 mi)

Major junctions
- West end: Nantes, France
- East end: Genoa, Italy

Location
- Countries: France; Switzerland; Italy

Highway system
- International E-road network; A Class; B Class

European route E 62 is a road in Europe, part of the United Nations International E-road network. Approximately 1,307 kilometers (812 mi) long, it connects the French Atlantic port city of Nantes to Genoa, largest of Italy's port cities. Between France and Italy it also passes through Switzerland, via Geneva and Lausanne. After crossing into Italy (shortly after the Simplon Pass, the highest point on the European route network inside Europe), the E 62 passes Milan, Italy's largest commercial and industrial centre, before descending to Genoa on the Mediterranean coast.

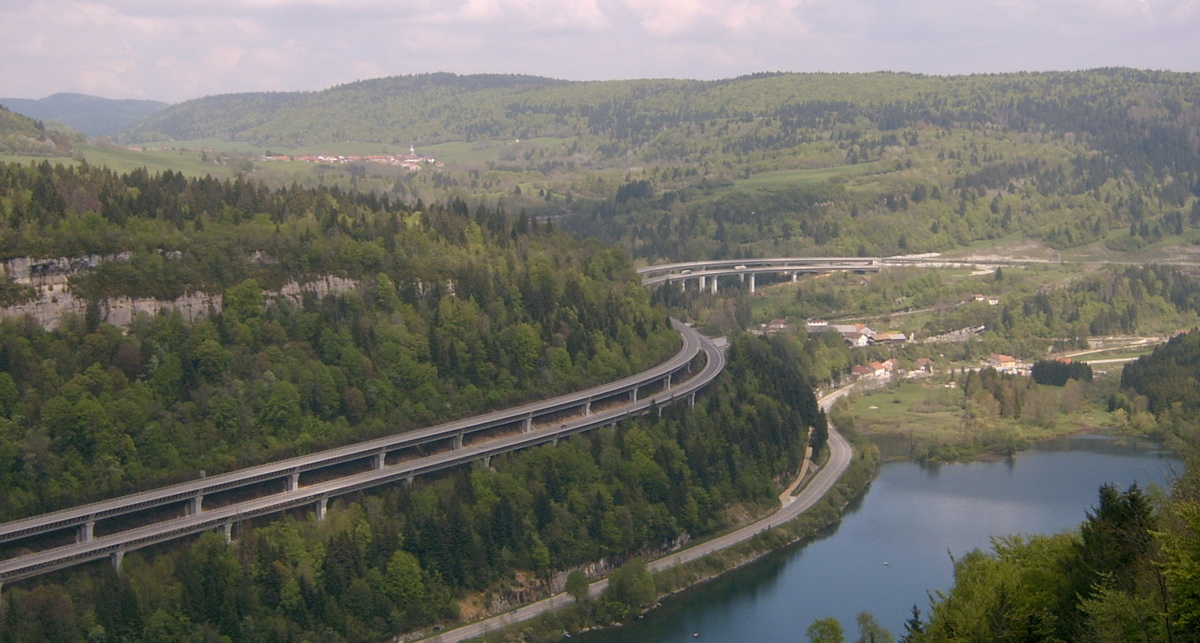
Viaduct of Sylans on the A40/E 62 near Nantua.

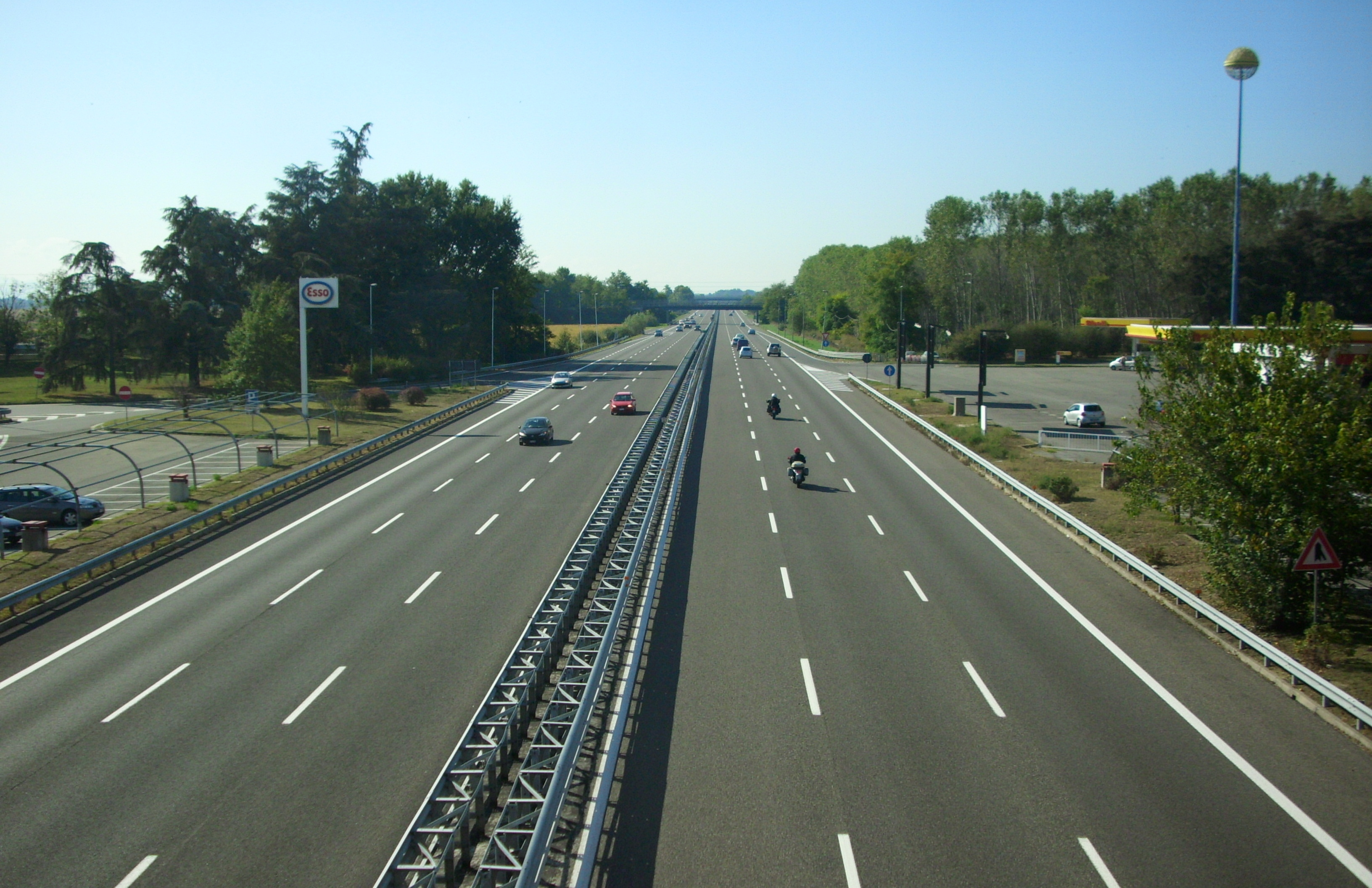
European route 62 near Dorno, Italy.

== France ==
- N249 Nantes-Cholet-Parthenay
- N149 Parthenay-Poitiers
- N147 Poitiers-Bellac
- N145 Bellac-Gueret-Montlucon-Moulins
- N79 Moulins-Digoin-Macon
- A40 Macon-Bourg en Bresse-Nantua-Switzerland

== Switzerland ==
- A1 France-Geneva-Lausanne
- A9 Lausanne-Vevey-Martigny-Sion-Brig-Simplon Pass-Gondo-Italy

== Italy ==
- SS 33 Switzerland-Iselle-Domodossola-A8
- A8 SS 33-Gallarate-Milano
- A7 Milano-Pavia-Alessandria-Genova

== The route ==
E62 Nantes-Genoa
State		National Road Number	Section	Junction (national numbering)	Pan European road connections
Europe France	Dept				
	44; 49	R.N.249	Nantes - Cholet	N249 N844	E 3 & E 60
	49; 79	R.N.249	Cholet - Bressuire	N249 A87; N249 N149	
	79	R.N.149	Bressuire - Parthenay		
	79; 86	R.N.149	Parthenay - Poitiers		
	86	R.N.147	Poitiers eastern by-pass	N148 A10	E 5
	86; 87	R.N.147	Mignaloux Beauvoir - Bellac		
	87; 23	R.N.145	Bellac - Saint Maurice la Souterraine	N145 A20	E 9
	23	R.N.145	Saint Maurice la Souterraine - Gouzon		
	23; 03	R.N.145	Gouzon - Montluçon		
	03	R.N.145	Montluçon northern by-pass		
	03	A714	Montluçon - A 714 A71		
	03	A71	A 714 A71 - Montmarault	A 71 10 Montluçon; A 71 L'Allier; A 71 11 Montmarault	doubling with E 11
	03; 71	A79	Montmarault - Paray le Monial		
	71	R.N.79	Paray le Monial - Mâcon		
	71; 01	A406	Mâcon southern by-pass	A 406 2 A 406 1 A 406 Toll station A 406 A40	
	01; 74	A40	Mâcon - St.-Julien-en-Genevois	A 40 4 Vonnas; A 40 5 Bourg en Bresse north A 40 A39; A 40 6 St. Étienne en Bresse; A 40 7 Bourg en Bresse south A 40 A42; A 40 8 Nantua; A 40 A404; A 40 9 Nantua les Neyrolles; A 40 10 Bellegarde; A 40 11 Frangy; A 40 Toll station A 40 13 St.-Julien-en-Genevois; A 40 A41	doubling with E 21
	74	A41	St.-Julien-en-Genevois - Geneva	A 41 A1 (Swiss)	doubling with E 25
-	Can				
	GE VD	A1	Geneva - Lausanne	A 1 1 A 1 2 Perly; A 1 3 Bernex; A 1 4 Vernier; A 1 5 Meyrin; A 1 6 Geneva airport A 1 7 Ferney (F); A 1 8 Versoix; A 1 9 Le Vengeron; A 1 10 Coppet; A 1 11 Nyon; A 1 12 Gland; A 1 La côte A 1 13 Rolle; A 1 14 Aubonne; A 1 15 Morges west A 1 16 Morges east A 1 17 Écublens; A 1 18 Lausanne Crissier; A 1 19 Villars-Sainte-Croix	doubling with E 25
	VD	A1	Lausanne - Vevey	A 1 8 Villars-Sainte-Croix; A 9 9 Lausanne-Blécherette; A 9 10 Lausanne-Vennes; A 9 11 Belmont; A 9 12 Lutry; A 9 13 Chexbres; A 9 14 Vevey	
	VD; VS	A9	Vevey–Martigny	A 9 15 Montreux; A 9 du Chablais; A 9 16 Villeneuve; A 9 17 Aigle; A 9 18 Saint-Triphon; A 9 19 Bex; A 9 20 Saint-Maurice; A 9 du Grand-Saint-Bernard; A 9 21 Martigny-Fully; A 9 22 Grand-Saint-Bernard	doubling with E 27
	VS	A9	Martigny–Sierre	A 9 23 Saxon; A 9 24 Riddes; A 9 25 Conthey; A 9 26 Sion west A 9 27 Sion east A 9 28 Sierre west A 9 29 Sierre east	
	VS	N9	Sierre - Susten		
	VS	A9	Susten - Gampel		
	VS	N9	Gampel - Brigerbad		
	VS	A9	Brigerbad - Brig		
	VS	A9	Brig southern by-pass		
	VS	N9	Ried - Simplon Pass		
	VS	N9	Simplon Pass - Gondo		
-	Prov				
	VB	SS 33	Gondo & Iselle - Domodossola		
	VB	SS 33	Domodossola - Gravellona Toce		
	VB; NO; VA	A26	Gravellona Toce - Gallarate	A 26 Baveno & Stresa; A 26 Brovello-Carpugnino; A 26 Toll Barrier; A 26 Arona; A 26 A 8 A 8 & A 26 Castelletto sopra Ticino; A 8 & A 26 Sesto Calende; A 8 & A 26 Verbano; A 8 & A 26 Besnate; A 8 & A 26 Gallarate Toll station A 8 & A 26 A 8 A 8 Gallarate	
	VA; MI	A8	Gallarate - Milan north	A 8 Busto Arsizio; A 8 Castellanza; A 8 Legnano; A 8 A 9 A 8 Lainate	
	MI	A50	Milan western by-pass	A 50	doubling with E 35 & E 64
	MI; PV; AL	A7	Milan - Tortona	A 50; A 7 Binasco; A 7 Pavia North; A 7 Pavia south A 7 Casei Gerola; A 7 Castelnuovo Scrivia; A 7 A21 / E70; A 7 Tortona	E 70
	AL; GE	A7	Tortona - Genoa	A 7 Serravalle Scrivia; A 7 Arquata Scrivia; A 7 Isola del Cantone; A 7 Ronco Scrivia; A 7 Busalla; A 7 Bolzaneto	doubling with E 25, E 80

== See also ==
- List of highest paved roads in Switzerland
