= A40 autoroute =

Road in France

A40 autoroute
- Autoroute des Titans; Autoroute Blanche

Route information
- Part of E21 / E25 / E62
- Maintained by APRR; ATMB
- Length: 208 km (129 mi)
- Existed: 1973–present

Major junctions
- West end: E15 / E21 / A 6 at Mâcon

- E62 / A 406 in Saint-André-de-Bâgé A 39 in Viriat E611 / A 42 in Druillat A 404 in Saint-Martin-du-Frêne E21 / E62 / A 41 in Saint-Julien-en-Genevois A 411 in Scientrier A 410 in Scientrier

- East end: E25 / N 205 at Passy

Location
- Country: France

Highway system
- Roads in France; Autoroutes; Routes nationales

The Autoroute A40 is a motorway in France that extends from Mâcon on the west to Passy on the east, terminating not far from Chamonix and the Mont Blanc Tunnel. The road runs 208 kilometres (129 mi) through Bresse, the high southern Jura Mountains, northern Prealps and French Alps. It was fully completed in 1990, and includes 12 viaducts and 3 tunnels. The road is maintained by Autoroutes Paris-Rhin-Rhône (APRR and ATMB), comprising part of European routes E25 and E62.

== Nomenclature ==
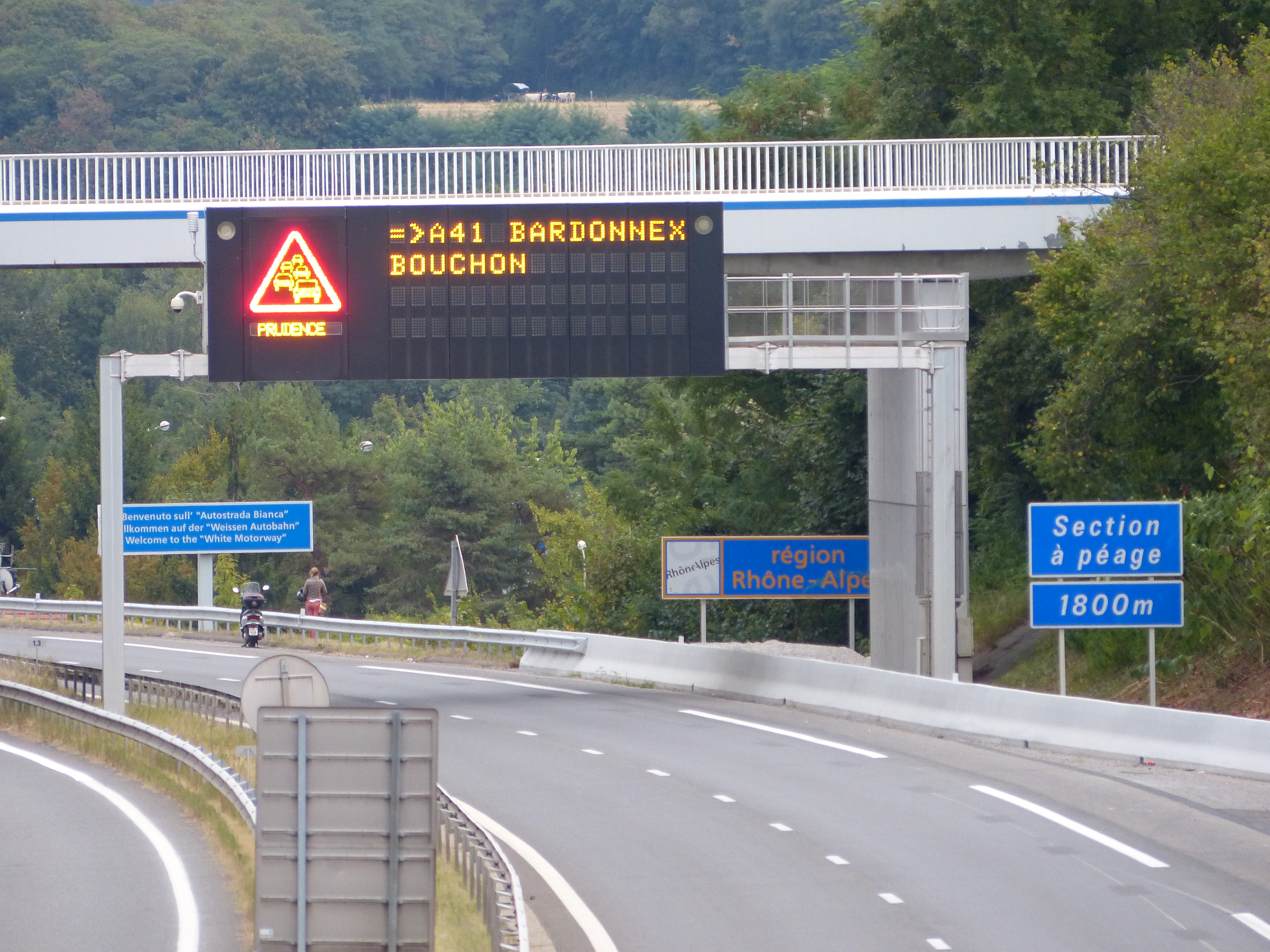
A trilingual sign written: "Welcome to the 'White Motorway'" in the Rhône-Alpes region

Autoroute A40 is named Autoroute des Titans ("Highway of the Titans") for the dramatic engineering construction through the mountainous sections between Bourg-en-Bresse and Bellegarde-sur-Valserine, and as Autoroute Blanche ("the White Motorway") through the snow-laden Jura and Alps between Bellegarde-sur-Valserine and Annemasse on the Swiss border.

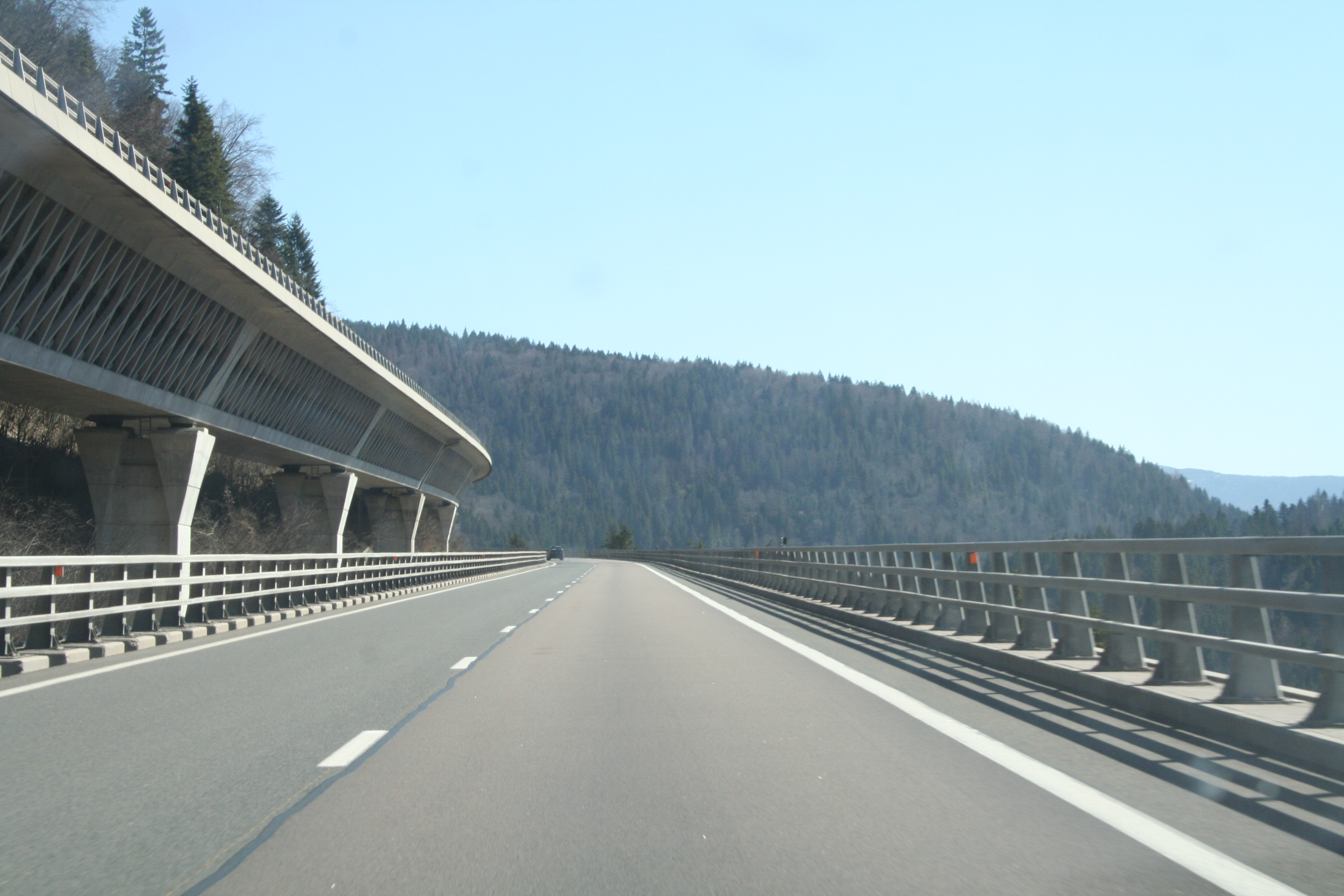
A40 motorway between Nantua and Geneva

== History ==
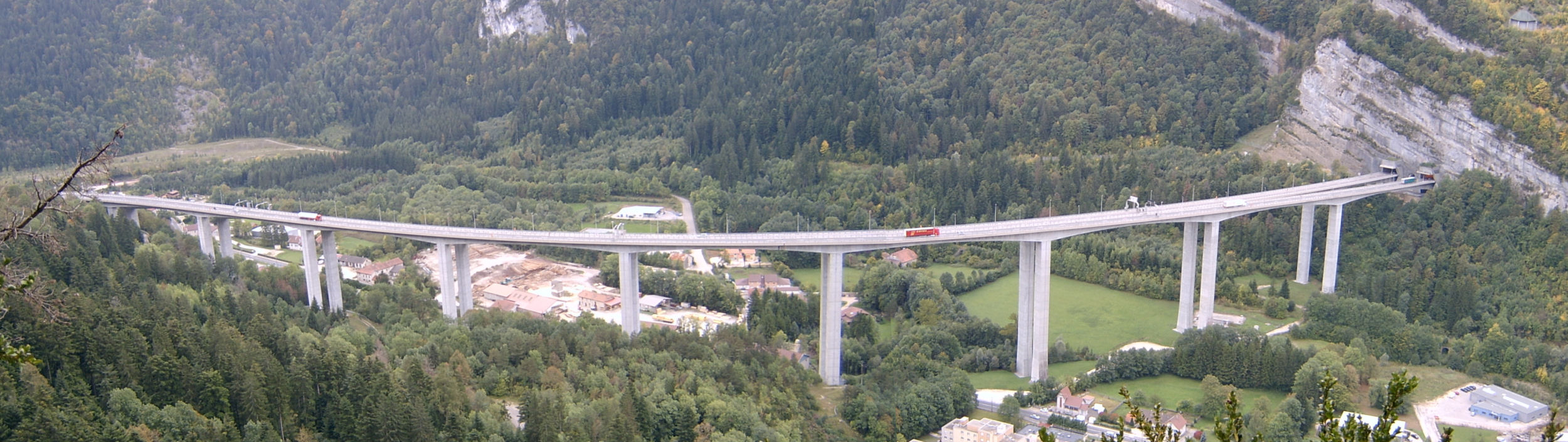
The Nantua viaduct on the "Highway of the Titans" of Autoroute A40

=== ATMB ===
- 1973 : The section between Vallard and Bonneville was opened.
- 1974 : The section between Bonneville and Cluses was opened.
- 1975 : The section between Cluses and Sallanches was opened.
- 1976 : The section between Sallanches-Passy was opened in a ceremony presided over by Prime Minister Jacques Chirac.
- 1982 : The 50 kilometre section between Bellegarde and Annemasse is opened.

These sections were previously numbered B41.

=== APRR ===
- 1985 : Section between Bourg-Nord and -Bourg-Sud (20 km) completed.
- 1986 : Opening of section between Bourg-Sud and Sylans (Nantua) (61 km). The French President, François Mitterrand opened the motorway giving it the name L'Autoroute des Titans.
- 1987 : Opening of the section Mâcon to Bourg-Nord (27 km)
- 1989 : Opening of the section Sylans to Châtillon-en-Michaille (13 km)
- 1990 : Opening of the junction between the A6 autoroute and the A40 (3 km)
- 1995 : Widening of the Chamoise Tunnel and viaduct at Nantua and Neyrolles

The western section between the A6 and A42 was originally given the number F42. The whole road was re-numbered the A40 including a short section where the road merges with the A42.

== Characteristics ==
The autoroute is made up of two lanes for each traffic direction except between its junctions with the A42 and A39 (21 km) where there are three lanes on each side.

== List of exits and junctions ==
Region	Department	Junction	Destinations	Notes
Auvergne-Rhône-Alpes	Saône-et-Loire	A6 - A40	Paris, Dijon, Chalon-sur-Saône	
Auvergne-Rhône-Alpes	Saône-et-Loire	1 : Mâcon-centre	Mâcon	
Auvergne-Rhône-Alpes	Ain	2 : Feillens	Saint-Laurent-sur-Saône, Pont-de-Vaux, Feillens, Replonges	
Auvergne-Rhône-Alpes	Ain	3 : Replonges	Pont-de-Veyle, Vonnas, Replonges, Saint-Laurent-sur-Saône, Bourg-en-Bresse, Bâgé-Dommartin	
Auvergne-Rhône-Alpes	Ain	A406 - A40	Moulins, Montceau-les-Mines, Mâcon - sud	
Auvergne-Rhône-Alpes	Ain	E21 / A 40 becomes E21 / E62 / A 40		
Auvergne-Rhône-Alpes	Ain	Aire des Planons (Eastbound); Aire du musée de la Bresse (Westbound)		
Auvergne-Rhône-Alpes	Ain	4 : Saint-Genis-sur-Menthon	Vonnas, Saint-Genis-sur-Menthon	
Auvergne-Rhône-Alpes	Ain	5 : Bourg-en-Bresse - nord	Montrevel-en-Bresse, Viriat, Attignat, Bourg-en-Bresse - centre	
Auvergne-Rhône-Alpes	Ain	A39 - A40	Metz-Nancy (A31), Strasbourg (A36), Lons-le-Saunier, Lille, Dijon	
Auvergne-Rhône-Alpes	Ain	6 : Viriat	Bourg-en-Bresse - centre, est, Saint-Étienne-du-Bois, Val-Revermont, Viriat	
Auvergne-Rhône-Alpes	Ain	Aire de Bourg Teyssonge (Eastbound); Aire de Bourg Jasseron (Westbound)		
Auvergne-Rhône-Alpes	Ain	7 : Bourg-en-Bresse - sud	Bourg-en-Bresse - centre, Ceyzériat, Péronnas, Ainterexpo Ekinox	
Auvergne-Rhône-Alpes	Ain	Aire de Certines (Eastbound); Aire de Tossiat (Westbound)		
Auvergne-Rhône-Alpes	Ain	A42 - A40	Lyon, Chambéry, Grenoble, Saint Exupéry	
Auvergne-Rhône-Alpes	Ain	Aire de Neuville-sur-Ain (Westbound)		
Auvergne-Rhône-Alpes	Ain	Aire de Ceignes-Cerdon (Eastbound); Aire de Ceignes-Haut-Bugey (Westbound)		
Auvergne-Rhône-Alpes	Ain	8 : Saint-Martin-du-Fresne + A404 - A40	Plateau d'Hauteville, Saint-Martin-du-Fresne	
Auvergne-Rhône-Alpes	Ain	8 : Saint-Martin-du-Fresne + A404 - A40	Oyonnax, Nantua	
Auvergne-Rhône-Alpes	Ain	9 : Sylans	Saint-Germain-de-Joux, Nantua, Lac de Sylans	
Auvergne-Rhône-Alpes	Ain	9 : Sylans	Aire du Lac (Eastbound); Aire des Neyrolles (Westbound)	
Auvergne-Rhône-Alpes	Ain	Aire de La Michaille (Eastbound); Aire de La Semine (Westbound)		
Auvergne-Rhône-Alpes	Ain	10 : Bellegarde	Bellegarde-sur-Valserine, Châtillon-en-Michaille	
Auvergne-Rhône-Alpes	Haute-Savoie	11 : Éloise	Seyssel, Frangy, Éloise, Rumilly, Annecy	
Auvergne-Rhône-Alpes	Haute-Savoie	Aire de Valleiry		
Auvergne-Rhône-Alpes	Haute-Savoie	Péage de Viry		
Auvergne-Rhône-Alpes	Haute-Savoie	13 : Saint-Julien-en-Genevois	Cruseilles, Saint-Julien-en-Genevois, Annecy	
Auvergne-Rhône-Alpes	Haute-Savoie	A41 - A40	Cointrin, Lausanne, Genève - centre, Grenoble, Annecy, Cruseilles	
Auvergne-Rhône-Alpes	Haute-Savoie	E25 / E62 / A 40 becomes E25 / A 40		
Auvergne-Rhône-Alpes	Haute-Savoie	13.1 : Archamps	Collonges-sous-Salève, Archamps, Technopôle	
Auvergne-Rhône-Alpes	Haute-Savoie	Aire du Télégraphe de Salève (Westbound)		
Auvergne-Rhône-Alpes	Haute-Savoie	A411 - A40 + 14 : Annemasse	Genève - Vallard, Gaillard	
Auvergne-Rhône-Alpes	Haute-Savoie	A411 - A40 + 14 : Annemasse	Annemasse, Reigner-Ésery	
Auvergne-Rhône-Alpes	Haute-Savoie	Péage de Nangy + Aire de Nangy - sud (Eastbound); Aire de Nangy - nord (Westbound)		
Auvergne-Rhône-Alpes	Haute-Savoie	15 : Vallee Verte	Thonon-les-Bains, Évian-les-Bains, Saint-Jeoire, Vallée Verte, Reignier-Esery	
Auvergne-Rhône-Alpes	Haute-Savoie	A410 - A40	La Roche-sur-Foron, Annecy, Grenoble (A41), Lyon (A43)	
Auvergne-Rhône-Alpes	Haute-Savoie	16 : Bonneville - ouest	Bonneville - centre, Saint-Pierre-en-Faucigny, La Roche-sur-Foron	
Auvergne-Rhône-Alpes	Haute-Savoie	Aire de Bonneville		
Auvergne-Rhône-Alpes	Haute-Savoie	17 : Bonneville-est	Thyez, Marignier, Bonneville - Z. I	
Auvergne-Rhône-Alpes	Haute-Savoie	18 : Scionzier	Morzine-Avoriaz, Les Gets, Samoëns, Cluses - ouest	
Auvergne-Rhône-Alpes	Haute-Savoie	19 : Cluses	Flaine, Magland, Les Carroz d'Arâches, Cluses - centre, C.R. des Douanes	
Auvergne-Rhône-Alpes	Haute-Savoie	Péage de Cluses		
Auvergne-Rhône-Alpes	Haute-Savoie	20 : Sallanches	Albertville, Megève, Sallanches, Hôpital, Magland	
Auvergne-Rhône-Alpes	Haute-Savoie	Aire de Passy (Westbound)		
Auvergne-Rhône-Alpes	Haute-Savoie	21 : Passy	Passy - centre, Saint-Gervais-les-Bains	
Auvergne-Rhône-Alpes	Haute-Savoie	22 Saint-Gervais-les-Bains	Passy - Chedde, Saint-Gervais-les-Bains, Albertville	Entry and exit from Italy
E25 / A 40 becomes E25 / N 205
1.000 mi = 1.609 km; 1.000 km = 0.621 mi
