= Lac de Nantua =

Lake in France

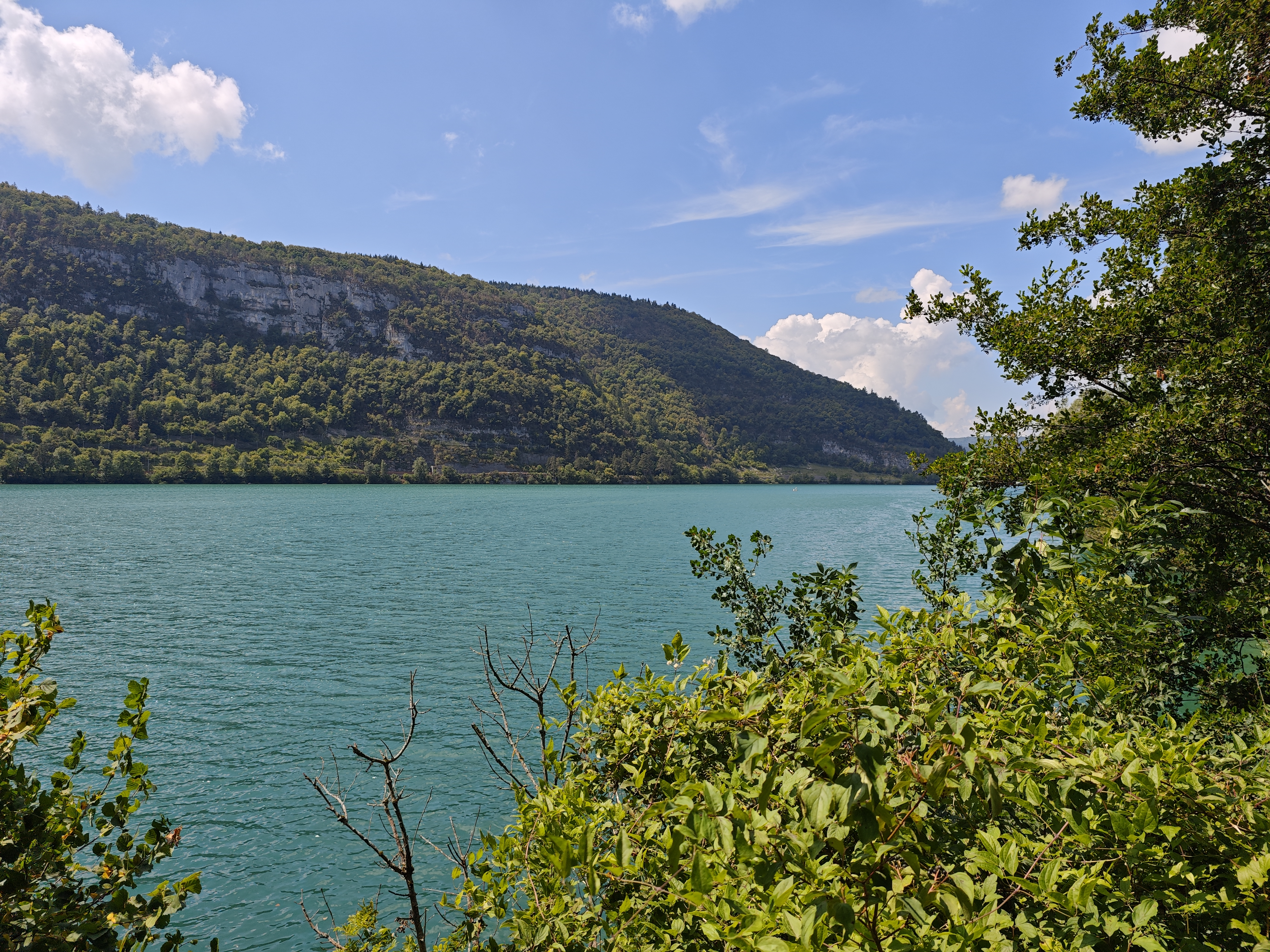
- A view of the Lac de Nantua

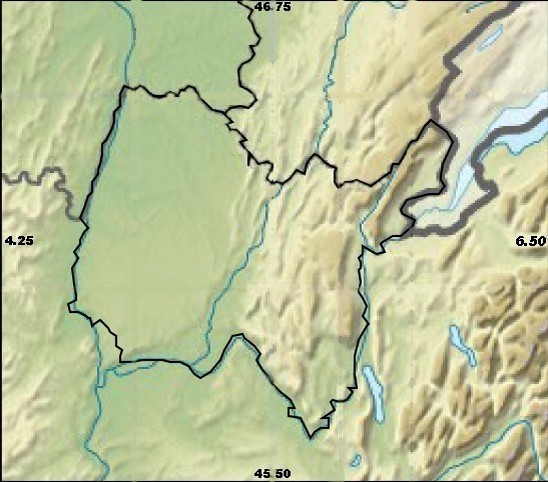
- Location within Ain
- Location: Nantua, Ain
- Coordinates: 46°9′43.62″N 5°35′17.75″E
- Type: Ice
- Basin countries: France
- Max. length: 2.7 km (1.7 mi)
- Max. width: 650 m (2,130 ft)
- Surface area: 1.41 km^{2} (0.54 sq mi)
- Average depth: 42.9 m (141 ft)
- Surface elevation: 475 m (1,558 ft)

The Lac de Nantua (Lake of Nantua) is a glacial lake in the southern foothills of the Jura Mountains in the Haut-Bugey historical region, located between Nantua, Montréal-la-Cluse and Port in the department of Ain, France. It covers 141 hectares (0.54 sq mi). The lake was made a protected natural site in 1935.

== Formation ==
The Lac de Nantua is a glacial lake. It was formed as the result of an overflow towards the west. The original extent of the lake, once the glaciers disappeared, was about two to three times its area in 2000 with extensions in the plain in three directions (Nurieux, Saint Martin du Frêne, Montreal). This explains its depth (42.9 m) and its configuration in the form of ice gorge east-west areas at risk of flooding towards the plain and Port area moraines. Its scope was much larger and was marked by two arms of lakes and large marshes from work done in 1856. This work lowered the lake level by more than one meter. The cleared zones were cleaned and sold in 1869 by the mayor of Nantua who previously owned these areas.
