= A404 autoroute =

Road in France

A404 autoroute

Route information
- Maintained by APRR
- Length: 19.8 km (12.3 mi)
- Existed: 1997–present

Major junctions
- South end: A40
- North end: Oyonnax

Location
- Country: France

Highway system
- Roads in France; Autoroutes; Routes nationales

The A404 autoroute is a motorway in France. The road connects A40 with Oyonnax and was completed in November 1997.

== List of junctions ==
Region	Department	km	mi	Junction	Destinations	Notes
Auvergne-Rhône-Alpes	Ain	0.0	0.0	A40 - A404 + 8 : Saint-Martin-du-Fresne	Paris, Lyon, Bourg-en-Bresse, Metz-Nancy, Annecy, Milan, Genève; Hauteville-Lompnes, Saint-Martin-du-Fresne, Maillat	
Auvergne-Rhône-Alpes	Ain	6.0	3.72	9 : La Croix Châlon	Nantua, Montréal-la-Cluse, Izernore	
Auvergne-Rhône-Alpes	Ain	Péage de Groissiat				
Auvergne-Rhône-Alpes	Ain	12	7.45	10 : Oyonnax - Z. I. Sud	Bellignat, Groissiat, Oyonnax	
Auvergne-Rhône-Alpes	Ain	16	9.94	11 : Oyonnax - ouest	Oyonnax	
Auvergne-Rhône-Alpes	Ain	17	10.5	12 : Oyonnax - Z. I. Nord	Oyonnax, Arbent	Northbound entry only / Southbound exit only
1.000 mi = 1.609 km; 1.000 km = 0.621 mi

== Future ==
The motorway A404 will be in the long term be extended to Saint-Claude and connected to the Swiss motorway network.
