= A404 =

A404 may refer to:

- A404 motorway (France)
- A404 road (England)
- RFA Bacchus (A404), a ship
