= Canton of Nantua =

Coordinates: 46°09′07″N 5°36′28″E

Nantua
- Canton
- Interactive map of Nantua
- Country: France
- Region: Auvergne-Rhône-Alpes
- Department: Ain
- No. of communes: {{{nbcomm}}}
- Area: 214.04 km^{2} (82.64 sq mi)
- Population (2023): 21,539
  - Density: 100.63/km^{2} (260.63/sq mi)
- INSEE code: 01 14

The canton of Nantua is an administrative division in eastern France. At the French canton reorganisation which came into effect in March 2015, the canton was expanded from 12 to 18 communes (2 of which merged into the new commune Le Poizat-Lalleyriat):

1. Apremont
2. Béard-Géovreissiat
3. Belleydoux
4. Bellignat
5. Brion
6. Charix
7. Échallon
8. Géovreisset
9. Groissiat
10. Maillat
11. Martignat
12. Montréal-la-Cluse
13. Nantua
14. Les Neyrolles
15. Le Poizat-Lalleyriat
16. Port
17. Saint-Martin-du-Frêne

== Demographics ==
Historical population
Year	Pop.	±% p.a.
2013	21,495	—
2018	21,409	−0.08%
Source: INSEE

== See also ==
- Cantons of the Ain department
- Communes of France
