= Échallon =

Commune in Auvergne-Rhône-Alpes, France

- Commune
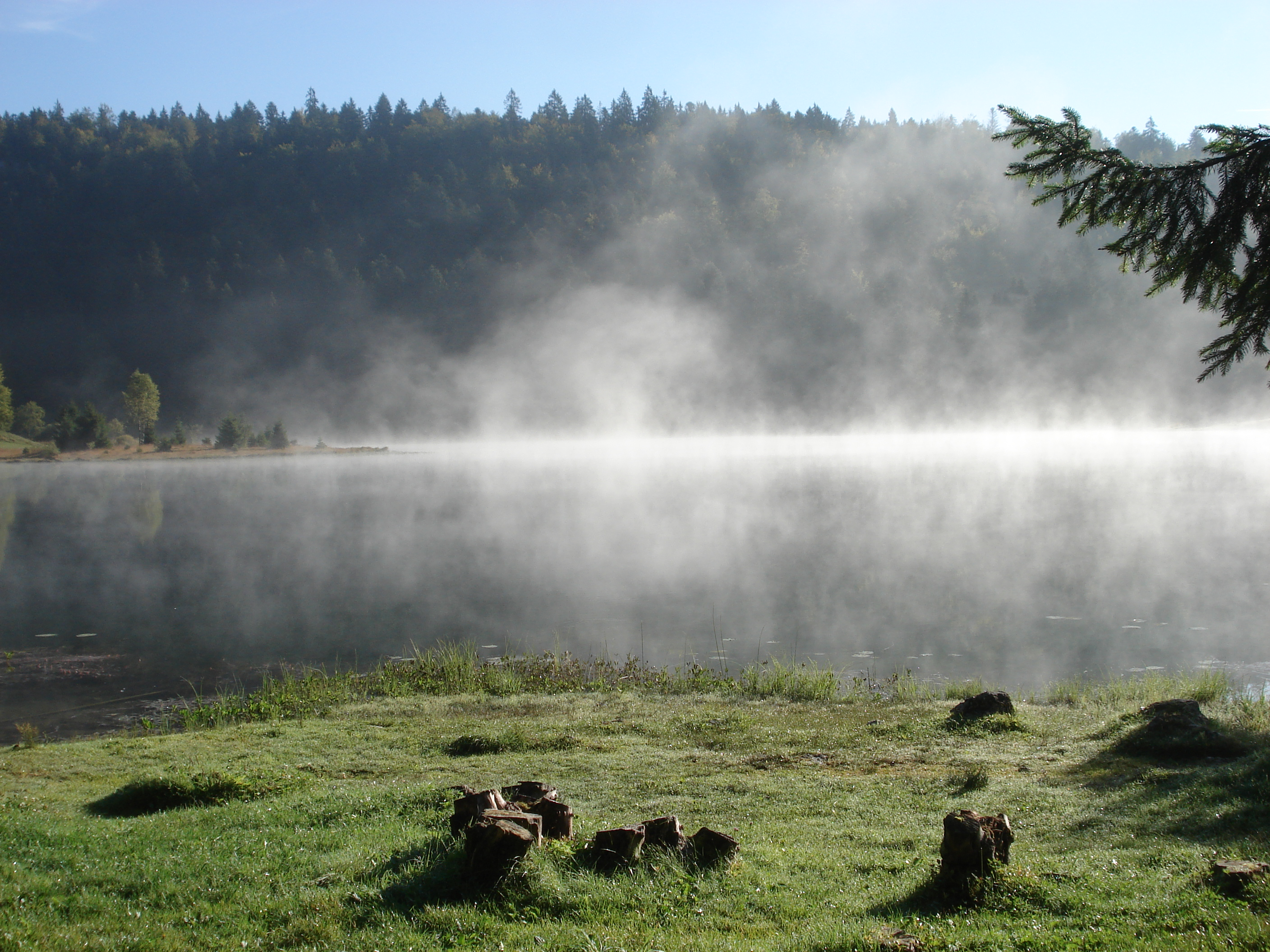
- Genin Lake

- Coat of arms
- Location of Échallon
- Location within France Location within Auvergne-Rhône-Alpes
- Coordinates: 46°12′39″N 5°44′31″E
- Country: France
- Region: Auvergne-Rhône-Alpes
- Department: Ain
- Arrondissement: Nantua
- Canton: Nantua
- Intercommunality: Haut-Bugey Agglomération

Government
  - Mayor (2026–32): Laurence Poncet
- Area^{1}: 28.09 km^{2} (10.85 sq mi)
- Elevation: 900 m (3,000 ft)
- Highest elevation: 1,082 m (3,550 ft)
- Lowest elevation: 510 m (1,670 ft)
- Population (2023): 784
  - Density: 27.9/km^{2} (72.3/sq mi)
- Time zone: UTC+01:00 (CET)
  - Summer (DST): UTC+02:00 (CEST)
- INSEE/Postal code: 01152 /01130
- Website: http://www.echallon.fr/
- ^{1} French Land Register data, which excludes lakes, ponds, glaciers > 1 km^{2} (0.386 sq mi or 247 acres) and river estuaries.

Échallon (French pronunciation: [eʃalɔ̃]) is a commune in the Ain department in eastern France.

== Population ==
Historical population
Year	Pop.	±% p.a.
1968	410	—
1975	423	+0.45%
1982	462	+1.27%
1990	550	+2.20%
1999	663	+2.10%
2007	765	+1.80%
2012	770	+0.13%
2017	757	−0.34%
2023	784	+0.59%
Source: INSEE

== See also ==
- Communes of the Ain department
