= A406 autoroute =

Road in France

A406 autoroute

Route information
- Part of E62
- Maintained by APRR
- Length: 11.1 km (6.9 mi)
- Existed: 2011–present

Major junctions
- East end: E21 / E62 / A 40 in Saint-André-de-Bâgé

- E15 / A 6 in Mâcon

- West end: E62 / N 79 in Charnay-lès-Mâcon

Location
- Country: France

Highway system
- Roads in France; Autoroutes; Routes nationales

The A406 near Mâcon, France

The A406 autoroute is a 11.1 km (6.9 mi) long motorway skirting the south side of Mâcon, France. It was opened in 2011. It connects the RN 79, and also the A6 motorway with the A40 motorway (connection Mâcon - Geneva, Switzerland via Bourg-en-Bresse).

== List of exits and junctions ==
Region	Department	km	mi	Junctions	Destinations	Notes
Auvergne-Rhône-Alpes	Ain	0,0	0.0	A40 - A406	Genève, Bourg-en-Bresse, Milan	Entry and exit from A40 (Bourg-en-Bresse)
Auvergne-Rhône-Alpes	Ain	Péage du Val de Saône				
Auvergne-Rhône-Alpes	Ain	4	2.48	1 : Crottet	Crottet, Replonges, Pont-de-Veyle, Vonnas, Châtillon-sur-Chalaronne	Exit and entry from RN 79
Bourgogne-Franche-Comté	Saône-et-Loire	9	5.59	2 : Mâcon - sud	Varennes-lès-Mâcon, Mâcon, Lyon, Villefranche-sur-Saône	
Bourgogne-Franche-Comté	Saône-et-Loire	10,3	6.40	2.1 : Vinzelles + A6 - A406	Vinzelles; Paris, Lyon, Villefranche-sur-Saône, Mâcon - nord	
Bourgogne-Franche-Comté	Saône-et-Loire	11	6.83	3 : Charnay-lès-Mâcon	Gare de Mâcon-Loché-TGV, Charnay-lès-Mâcon	
A 406 becomes N 79
1.000 mi = 1.609 km; 1.000 km = 0.621 mi
