= Scientrier =

Scientrier Shantrî (Savoyard)
- Commune
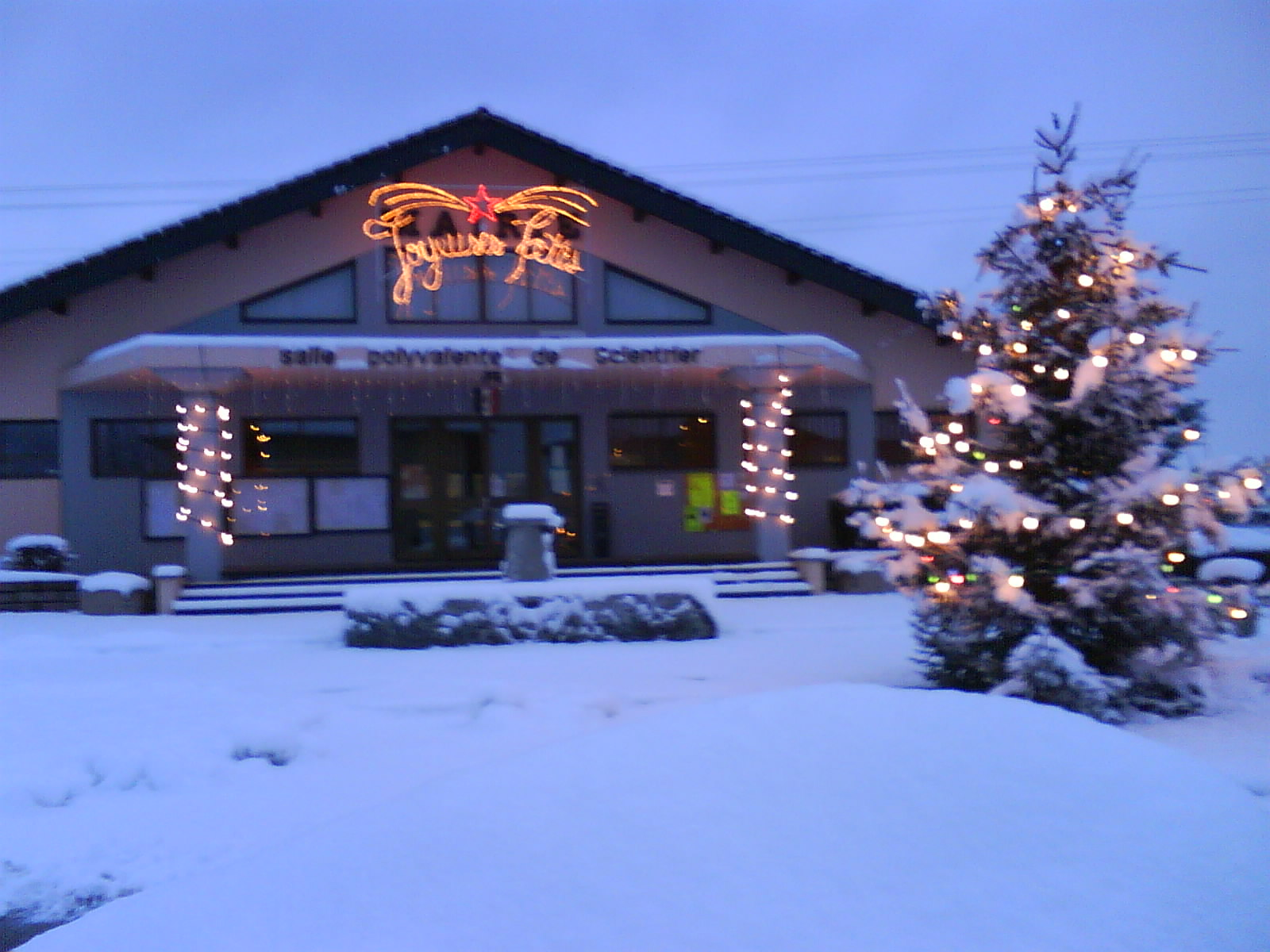
- The town hall in Scientrier

- Coat of arms
- Location of Scientrier
- Location within France Location within Auvergne-Rhône-Alpes
- Coordinates: 46°06′50″N 6°19′58″E
- Country: France
- Region: Auvergne-Rhône-Alpes
- Department: Haute-Savoie
- Arrondissement: Saint-Julien-en-Genevois
- Canton: La Roche-sur-Foron
- Intercommunality: Arve et Salève

Government
  - Mayor (2022–2026): Patricia Déage
- Area^{1}: 7.21 km^{2} (2.78 sq mi)
- Elevation: 454 m (1,490 ft)
- Highest elevation: 490 m (1,610 ft)
- Lowest elevation: 423 m (1,388 ft)
- Population (2023): 1,273
  - Density: 177/km^{2} (457/sq mi)
- Time zone: UTC+01:00 (CET)
  - Summer (DST): UTC+02:00 (CEST)
- INSEE/Postal code: 74262 /74930
- ^{1} French Land Register data, which excludes lakes, ponds, glaciers > 1 km^{2} (0.386 sq mi or 247 acres) and river estuaries.

Scientrier (Savoyard: Shantrî) is a commune in the Haute-Savoie department in the Auvergne-Rhône-Alpes region in south-eastern France.

== See also ==
- Communes of the Haute-Savoie department
