= Les Neyrolles =

Commune in Auvergne-Rhône-Alpes, France

- Commune
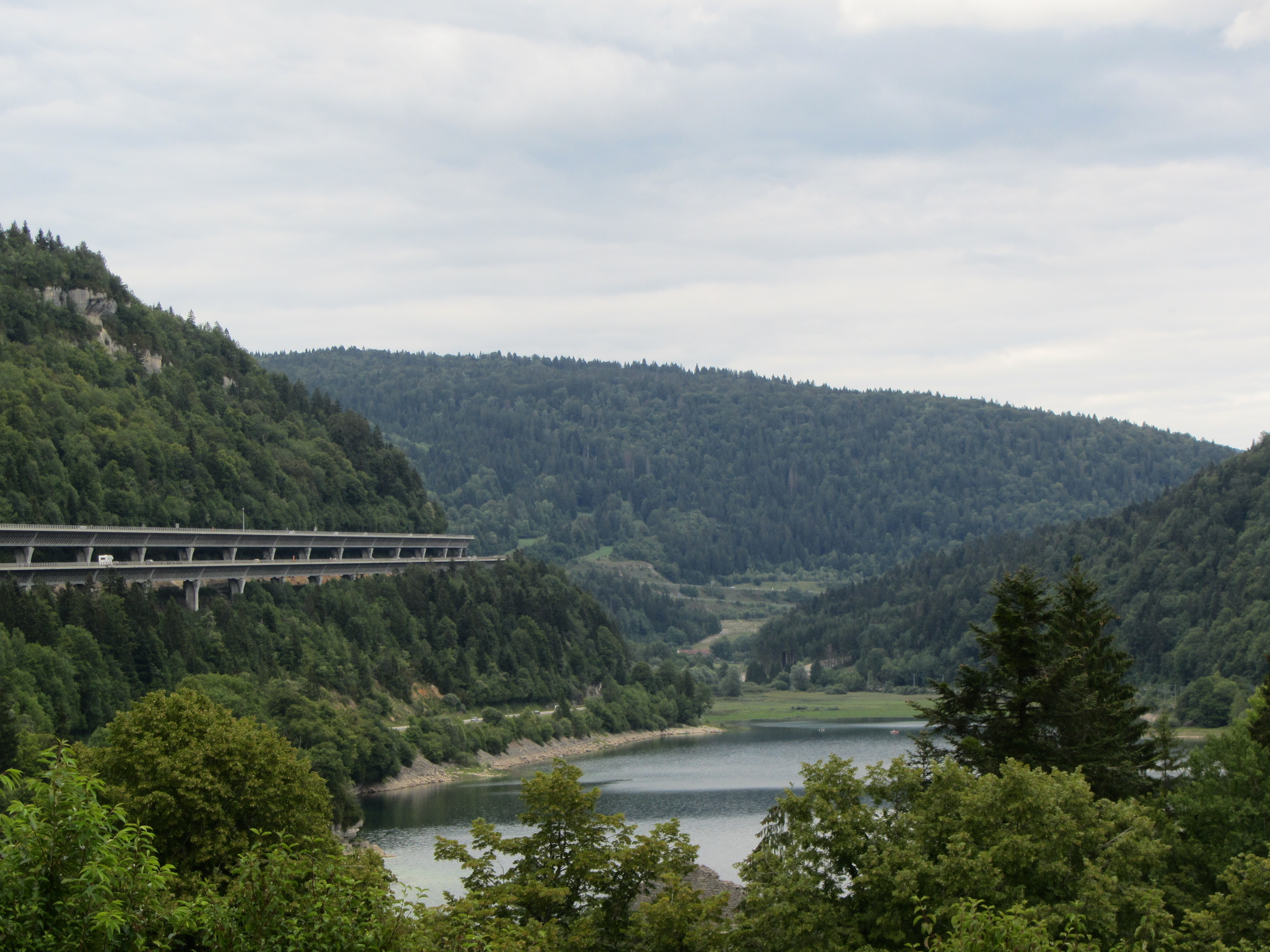
- Sylans Lake
- Location of Les Neyrolles
- Location within France Location within Auvergne-Rhône-Alpes
- Coordinates: 46°08′33″N 5°38′03″E
- Country: France
- Region: Auvergne-Rhône-Alpes
- Department: Ain
- Arrondissement: Nantua
- Canton: Nantua
- Intercommunality: Haut-Bugey Agglomération

Government
  - Mayor (2026–32): Emilie Desjours
- Area^{1}: 9.5 km^{2} (3.7 sq mi)
- Elevation: 625 m (2,051 ft)
- Highest elevation: 1,118 m (3,668 ft)
- Lowest elevation: 510 m (1,670 ft)
- Population (2023): 628
  - Density: 66/km^{2} (170/sq mi)
- Time zone: UTC+01:00 (CET)
  - Summer (DST): UTC+02:00 (CEST)
- INSEE/Postal code: 01274 /01130
- ^{1} French Land Register data, which excludes lakes, ponds, glaciers > 1 km^{2} (0.386 sq mi or 247 acres) and river estuaries.

Les Neyrolles (French pronunciation: [le nɛʁɔl]) is a commune in the Ain department in eastern France.

== Population ==
Historical population
Year	Pop.	±% p.a.
1968	383	—
1975	466	+2.84%
1982	526	+1.75%
1990	615	+1.97%
1999	617	+0.04%
2007	663	+0.90%
2012	634	−0.89%
2017	639	+0.16%
2023	628	−0.29%
Source: INSEE

== See also ==
- Communes of the Ain department
