= Groissiat =

Commune in Auvergne-Rhône-Alpes, France

- Commune
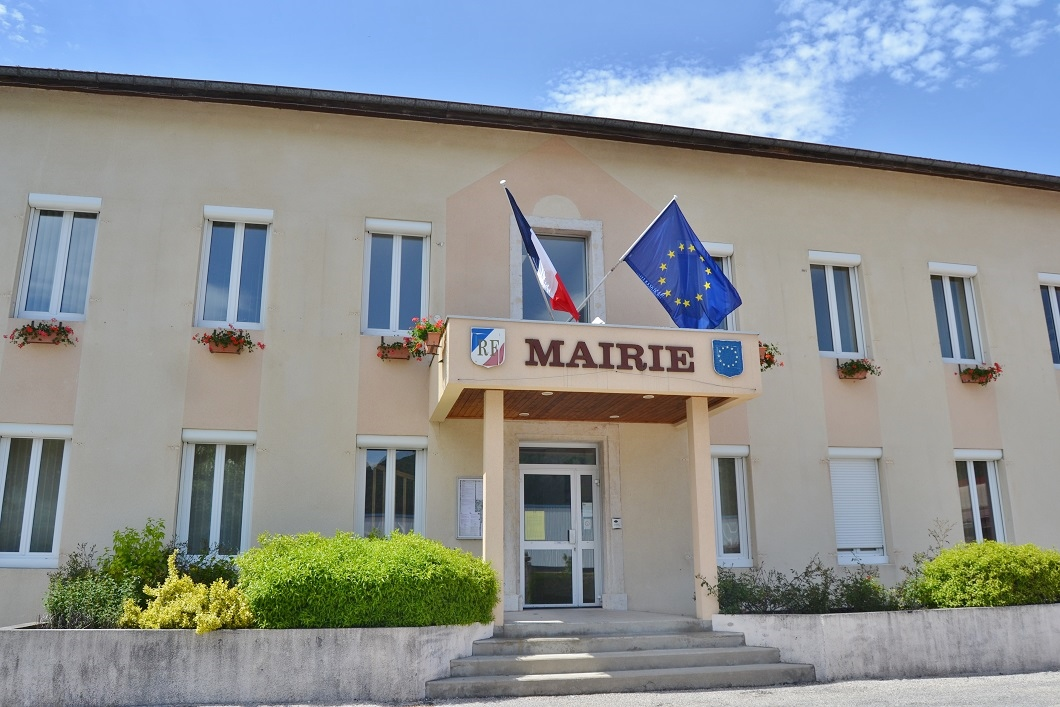
- Town hall
- Location of Groissiat
- Location within France Location within Auvergne-Rhône-Alpes
- Coordinates: 46°13′20″N 5°36′25″E
- Country: France
- Region: Auvergne-Rhône-Alpes
- Department: Ain
- Arrondissement: Nantua
- Canton: Nantua
- Intercommunality: Haut-Bugey Agglomération

Government
  - Mayor (2026–32): Patricia Deguerry
- Area^{1}: 6.32 km^{2} (2.44 sq mi)
- Elevation: 530 m (1,740 ft)
- Highest elevation: 940 m (3,080 ft)
- Lowest elevation: 507 m (1,663 ft)
- Population (2023): 1,205
  - Density: 191/km^{2} (494/sq mi)
- Time zone: UTC+01:00 (CET)
  - Summer (DST): UTC+02:00 (CEST)
- INSEE/Postal code: 01181 /01100
- ^{1} French Land Register data, which excludes lakes, ponds, glaciers > 1 km^{2} (0.386 sq mi or 247 acres) and river estuaries.

Groissiat (French pronunciation: [ɡʁwasja]) is a commune in the Ain department in eastern France.

== Population ==
Historical population
Year	Pop.	±% p.a.
1968	182	—
1975	310	+7.90%
1982	511	+7.40%
1990	611	+2.26%
1999	747	+2.26%
2007	1,098	+4.93%
2012	1,164	+1.17%
2017	1,229	+1.09%
2023	1,205	−0.33%
Source: INSEE

== See also ==
- Communes of the Ain department
