= Maillat =

Commune in Auvergne-Rhône-Alpes, France

- Commune
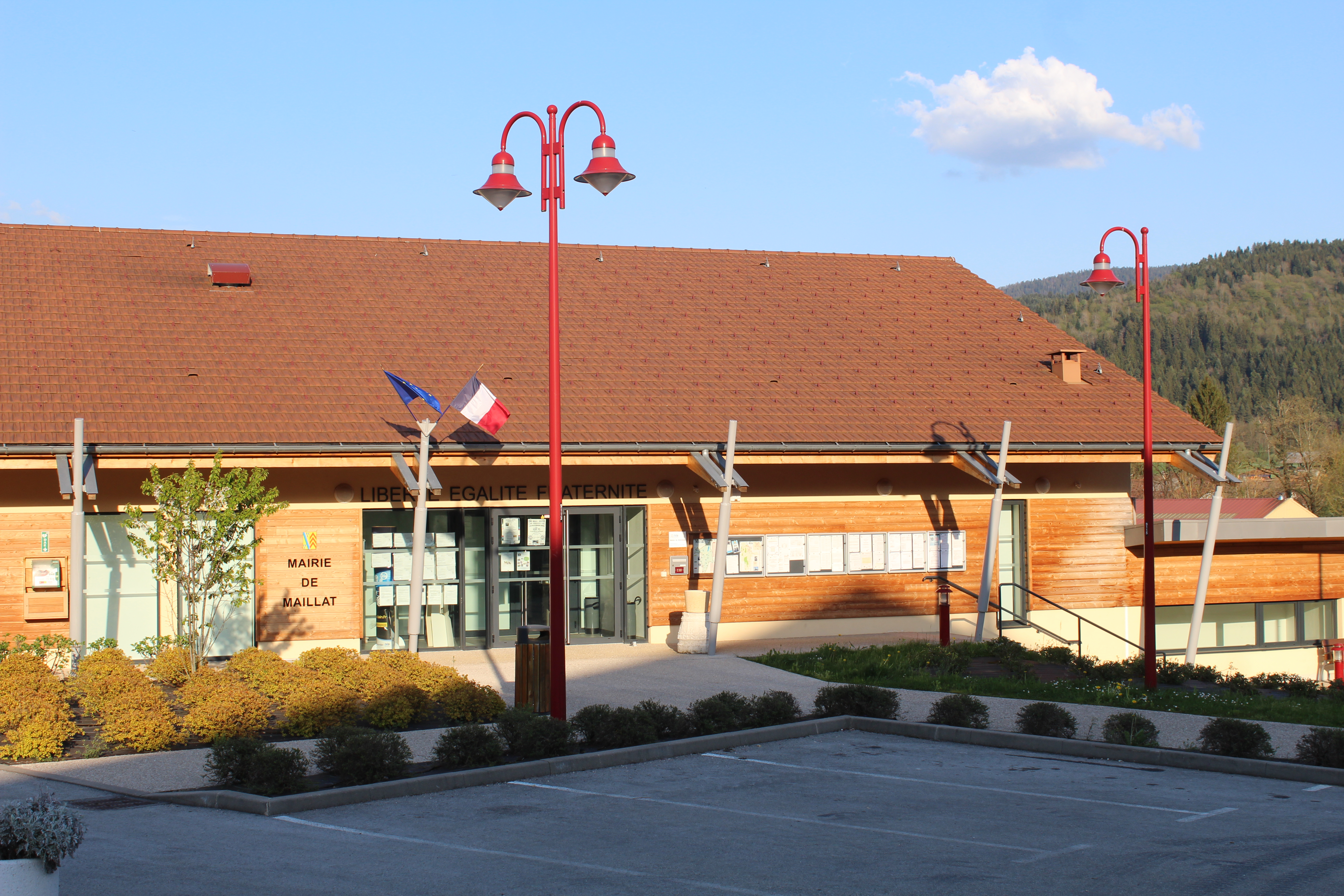
- Town hall

- Coat of arms
- Location of Maillat
- Location within France Location within Auvergne-Rhône-Alpes
- Coordinates: 46°08′00″N 5°33′00″E
- Country: France
- Region: Auvergne-Rhône-Alpes
- Department: Ain
- Arrondissement: Nantua
- Canton: Nantua
- Intercommunality: Haut-Bugey Agglomération

Government
  - Mayor (2026–32): Jean Cyrille Ducret
- Area^{1}: 11.5 km^{2} (4.4 sq mi)
- Elevation: 510 m (1,670 ft)
- Highest elevation: 825 m (2,707 ft)
- Lowest elevation: 497 m (1,631 ft)
- Population (2023): 669
  - Density: 58.2/km^{2} (151/sq mi)
- Time zone: UTC+01:00 (CET)
  - Summer (DST): UTC+02:00 (CEST)
- INSEE/Postal code: 01228 /01430
- ^{1} French Land Register data, which excludes lakes, ponds, glaciers > 1 km^{2} (0.386 sq mi or 247 acres) and river estuaries.

Maillat (French pronunciation: [maja]) is a commune in the Ain department in eastern France.

== Population ==
Historical population
Year	Pop.	±% p.a.
1968	520	—
1975	556	+0.96%
1982	578	+0.56%
1990	623	+0.94%
1999	664	+0.71%
2007	650	−0.27%
2012	657	+0.21%
2017	635	−0.68%
2023	669	+0.87%
Source: INSEE

== See also ==
- Communes of the Ain department
