= Port, Ain =

Commune in Auvergne-Rhône-Alpes, France

Port
- Commune
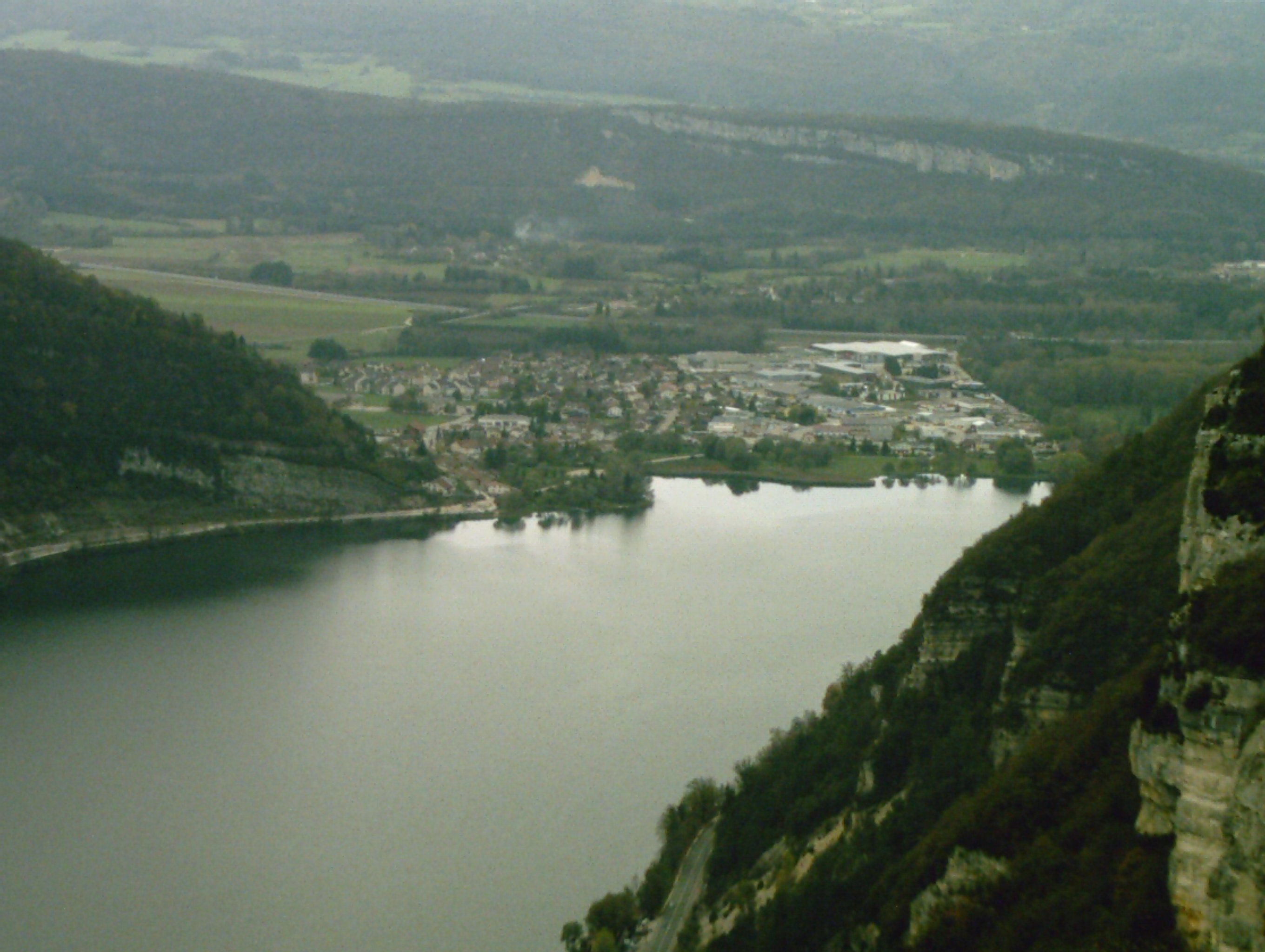
- Location of Port
- Location within France Location within Auvergne-Rhône-Alpes
- Coordinates: 46°09′55″N 5°34′16″E
- Country: France
- Region: Auvergne-Rhône-Alpes
- Department: Ain
- Arrondissement: Nantua
- Canton: Nantua
- Intercommunality: Haut-Bugey Agglomération

Government
  - Mayor (2026–32): Catherine Chantran
- Area^{1}: 4.25 km^{2} (1.64 sq mi)
- Elevation: 465 m (1,526 ft)
- Highest elevation: 991 m (3,251 ft)
- Lowest elevation: 460 m (1,510 ft)
- Population (2023): 832
  - Density: 196/km^{2} (507/sq mi)
- Time zone: UTC+01:00 (CET)
  - Summer (DST): UTC+02:00 (CEST)
- INSEE/Postal code: 01307 /01460
- ^{1} French Land Register data, which excludes lakes, ponds, glaciers > 1 km^{2} (0.386 sq mi or 247 acres) and river estuaries.

Port (French pronunciation: [pɔʁ]) is a commune in the Ain department in eastern France.

== Population ==
Historical population
Year	Pop.	±% p.a.
1968	240	—
1975	355	+5.75%
1982	509	+5.28%
1990	773	+5.36%
1999	913	+1.87%
2007	881	−0.44%
2012	850	−0.71%
2017	849	−0.02%
2023	832	−0.34%
Source: INSEE

== See also ==
- Communes of the Ain department
