= Saint-Julien-en-Genevois =

Subprefecture of Haute-Savoie, Auvergne-Rhône-Alpes, France

Saint-Julien-en-Genevois Sant-Jelien (Arpitan)
- Subprefecture and commune
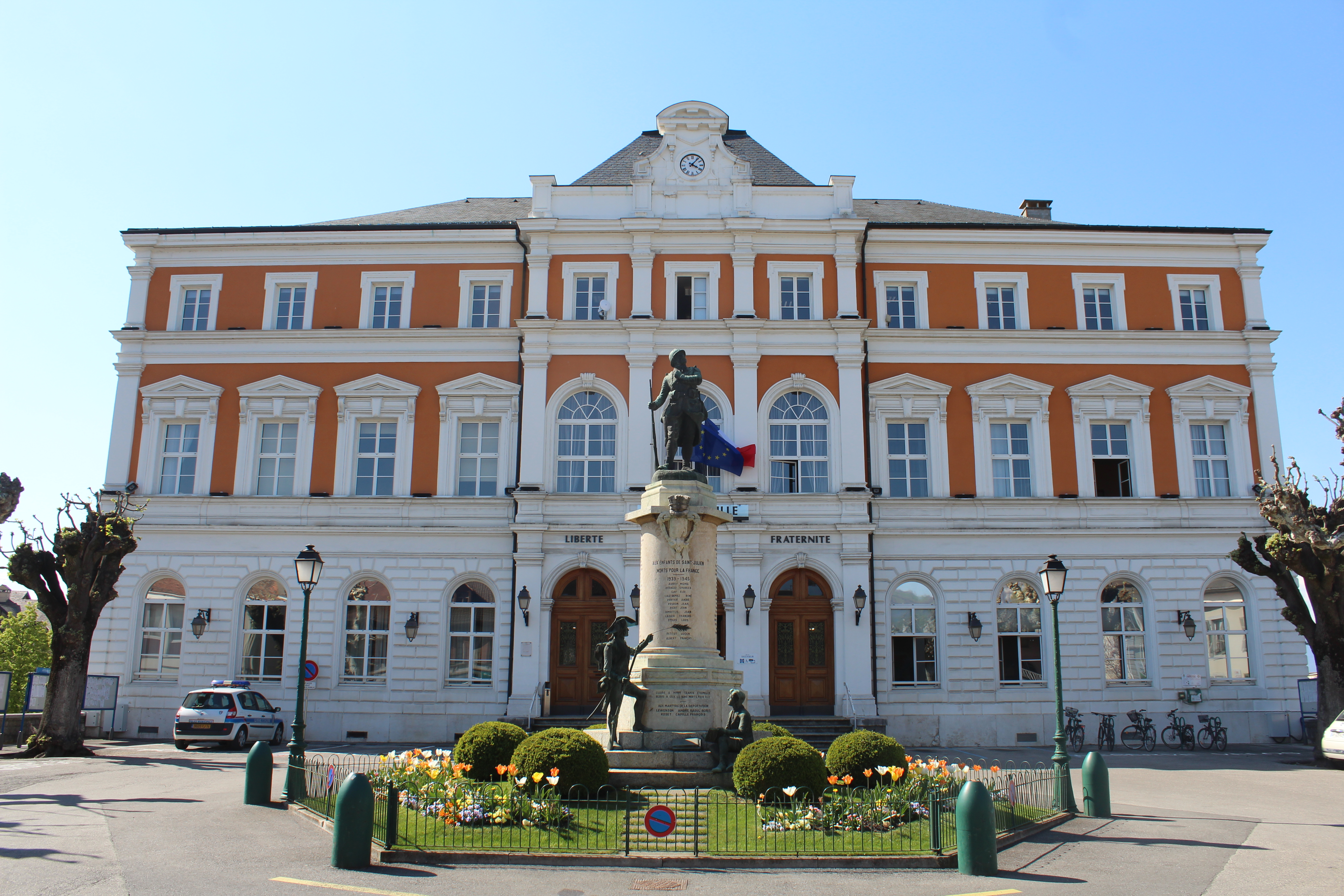
- Saint-Julien-en-Genevois Town Hall

- Coat of arms
- Location of Saint-Julien-en-Genevois
- Location within France Location within Auvergne-Rhône-Alpes
- Coordinates: 46°08′37″N 6°04′52″E
- Country: France
- Region: Auvergne-Rhône-Alpes
- Department: Haute-Savoie
- Arrondissement: Saint-Julien-en-Genevois
- Canton: Saint-Julien-en-Genevois
- Intercommunality: Genevois

Government
  - Mayor (2020–2026): Véronique Lecauchois
- Area^{1}: 15 km^{2} (5.8 sq mi)
- Elevation: 468 m (1,535 ft)
- Population (2023): 16,222
  - Density: 1,100/km^{2} (2,800/sq mi)
- Time zone: UTC+01:00 (CET)
  - Summer (DST): UTC+02:00 (CEST)
- INSEE/Postal code: 74243 /74160
- ^{1} French Land Register data, which excludes lakes, ponds, glaciers > 1 km^{2} (0.386 sq mi or 247 acres) and river estuaries.

Saint-Julien-en-Genevois (French pronunciation: [sɛ̃ ʒyljɛ̃ ɑ̃ ʒənvwa]; Arpitan: Sant-Jelien) is a subprefecture of the Haute-Savoie department in the Auvergne-Rhône-Alpes region in Eastern France.

== Geography ==
Saint-Julien-en-Genevois is located right on the Swiss border some 9 km (5.6 mi) southwest of the city centre of Geneva and forms part of its metropolitan area.

The commune of Saint Julien-en-Genevois also consists of the following villages: Thairy, Crâche, Thérens, Norcier, Ternier, Lathoy.

== Population ==
Historical population
Year	Pop.	±% p.a.
1968	3,872	—
1975	6,212	+6.99%
1982	6,795	+1.29%
1990	7,922	+1.94%
1999	9,140	+1.60%
2007	11,154	+2.52%
2012	12,099	+1.64%
2017	14,258	+3.34%
2023	16,222	+2.17%
Source: INSEE

== Economy ==
In 2007, there were 4,491 jobs in Saint-Julien-en-Genevois and 5,401 active inhabitants. However, 46.1% of active inhabitants were working in neighbouring Switzerland. The unemployment rate stood at 10.6%, twice as high as in the neighbouring rural and residential communes.

== Culture ==
Every summer, a rock-oriented music festival called "Guitare en Scène" is held in Saint-Julien-en-Genevois. Famous past performers include Sting and Carlos Santana.

== Twin town ==
Saint-Julien-en-Genevois has been twinned with Mössingen, Germany, since 13 January 1990.

== Gallery ==
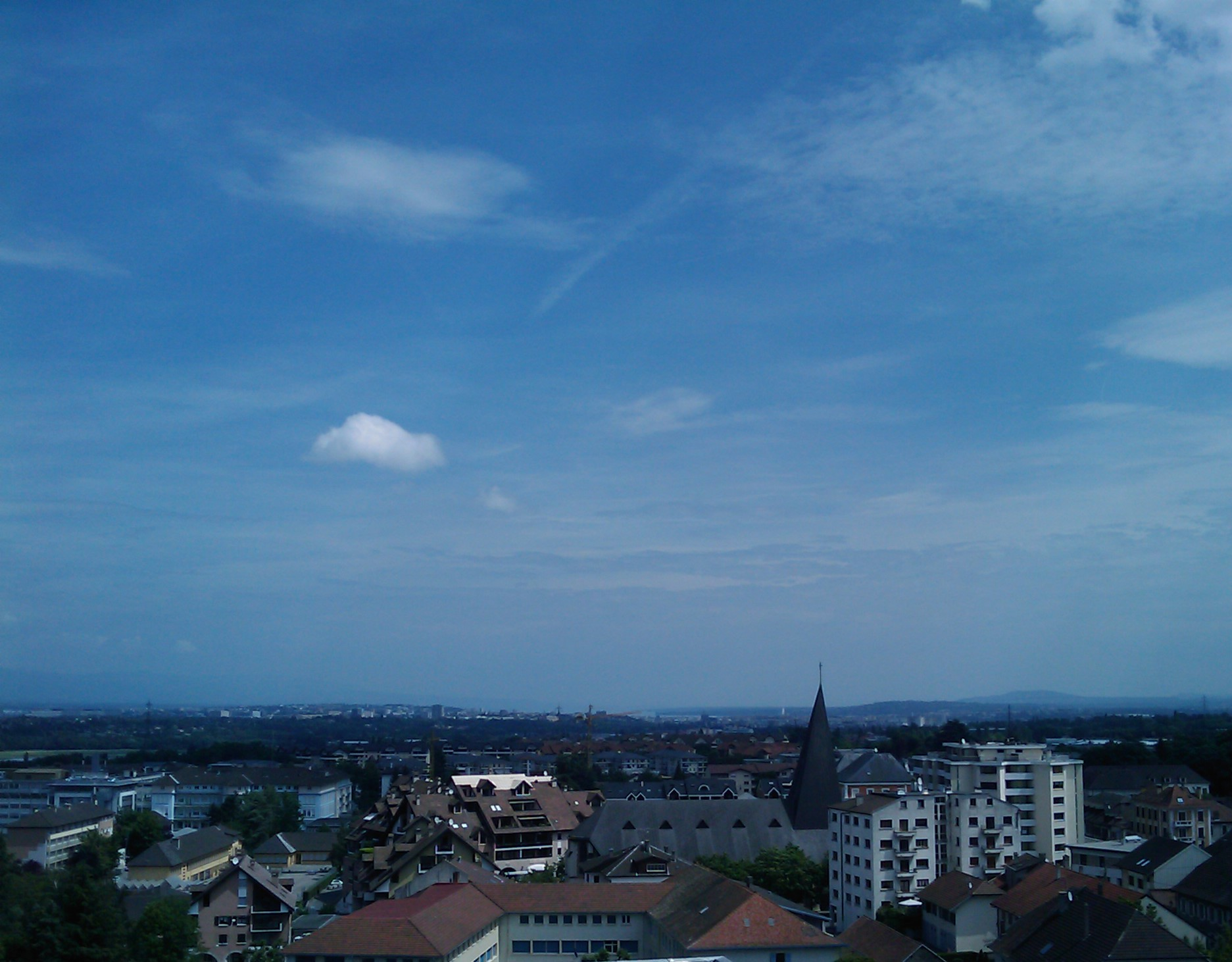
General view of Saint-Julien with Geneva in the background

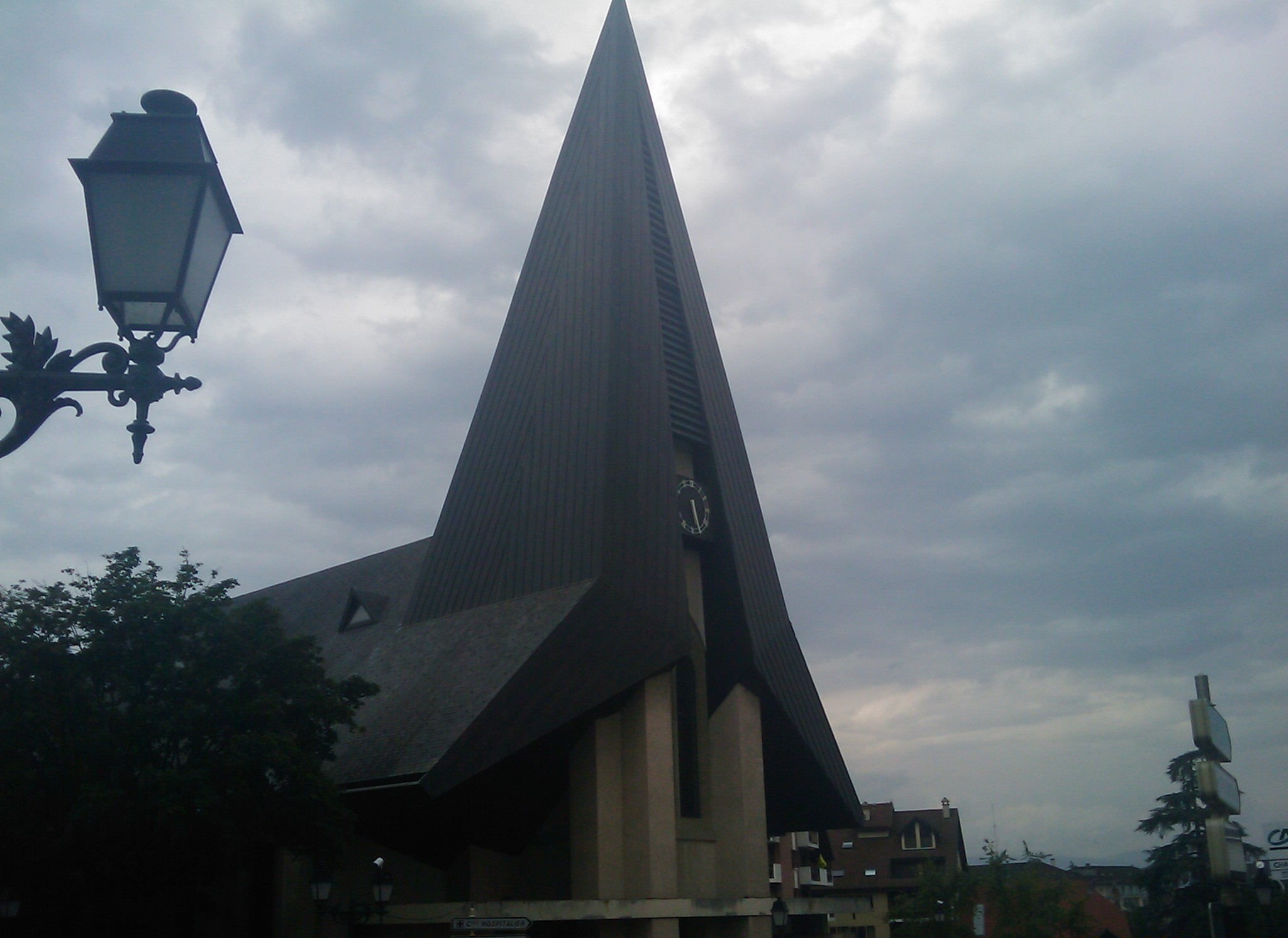
The church square

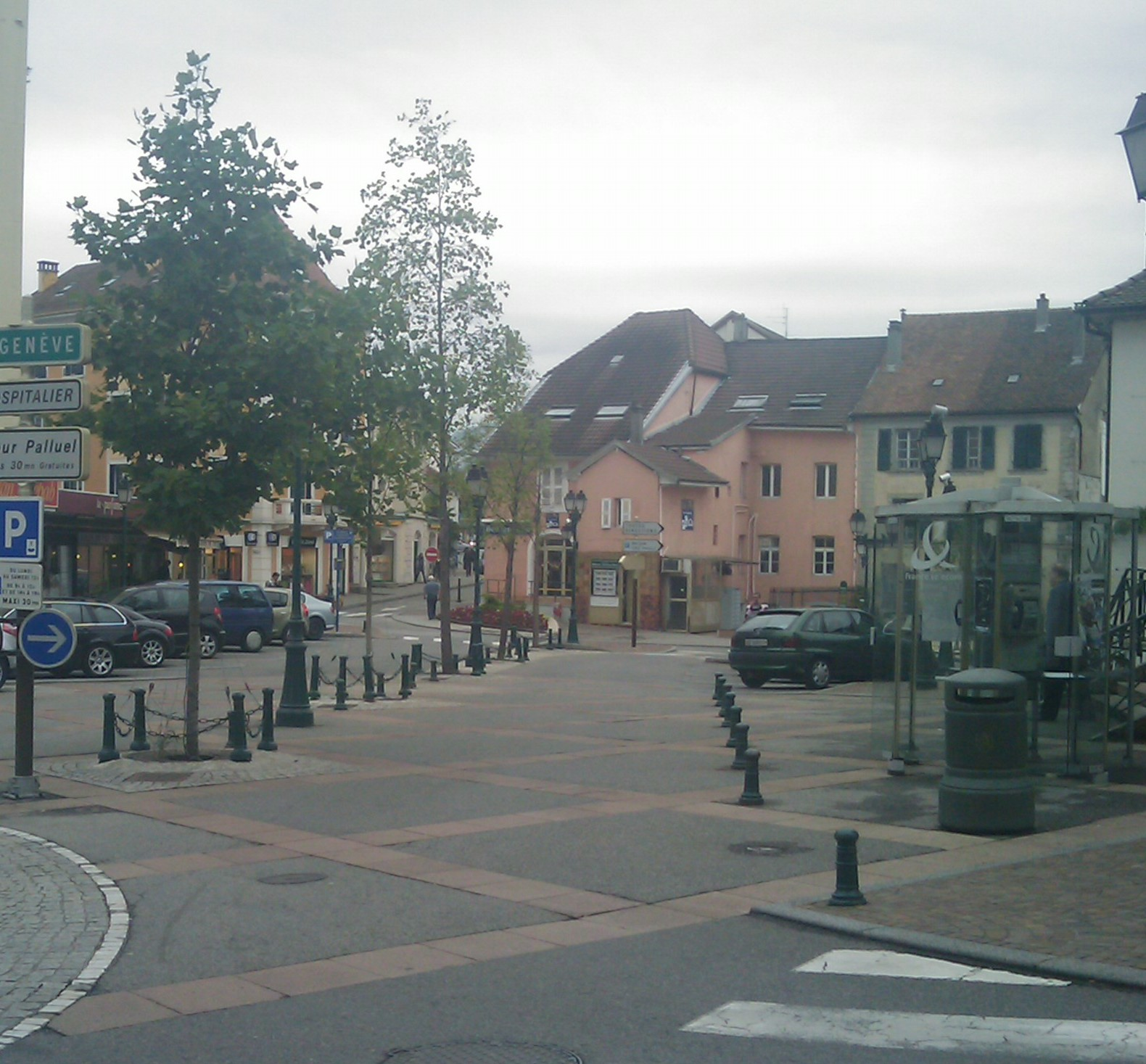
Place de la Libération, the main square

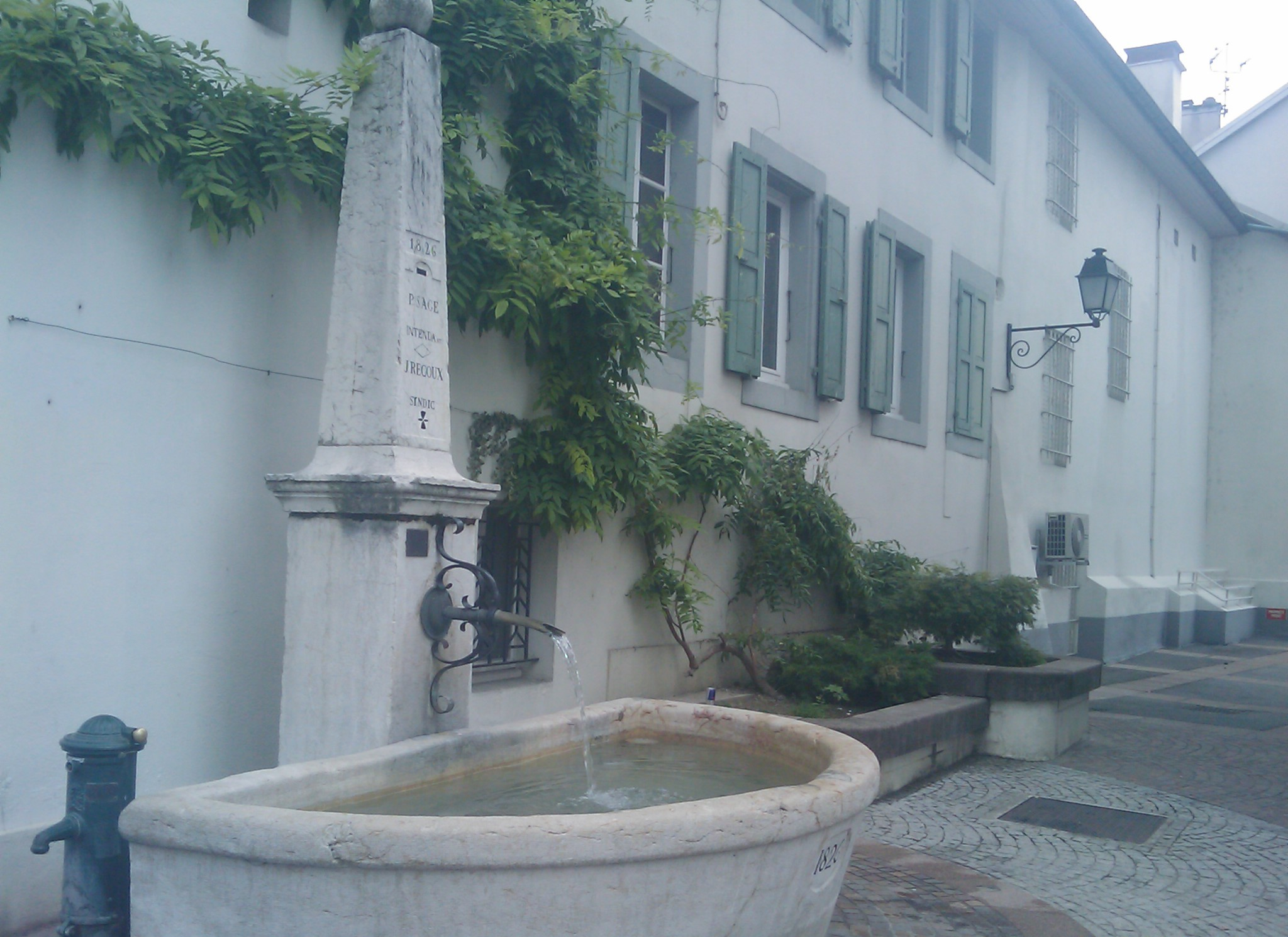
The old water trough at the Place de la Libération

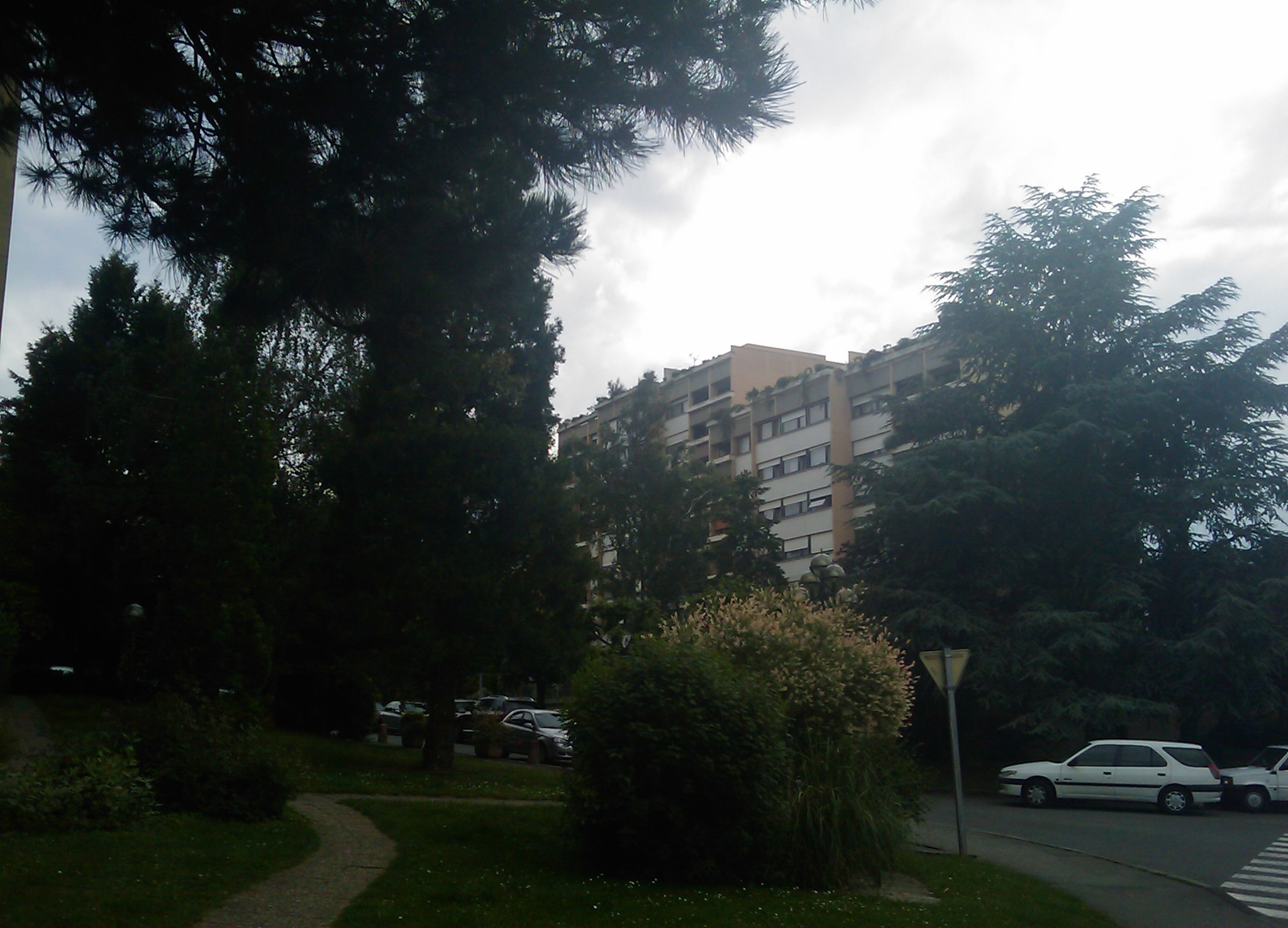
L'Escalade residential area

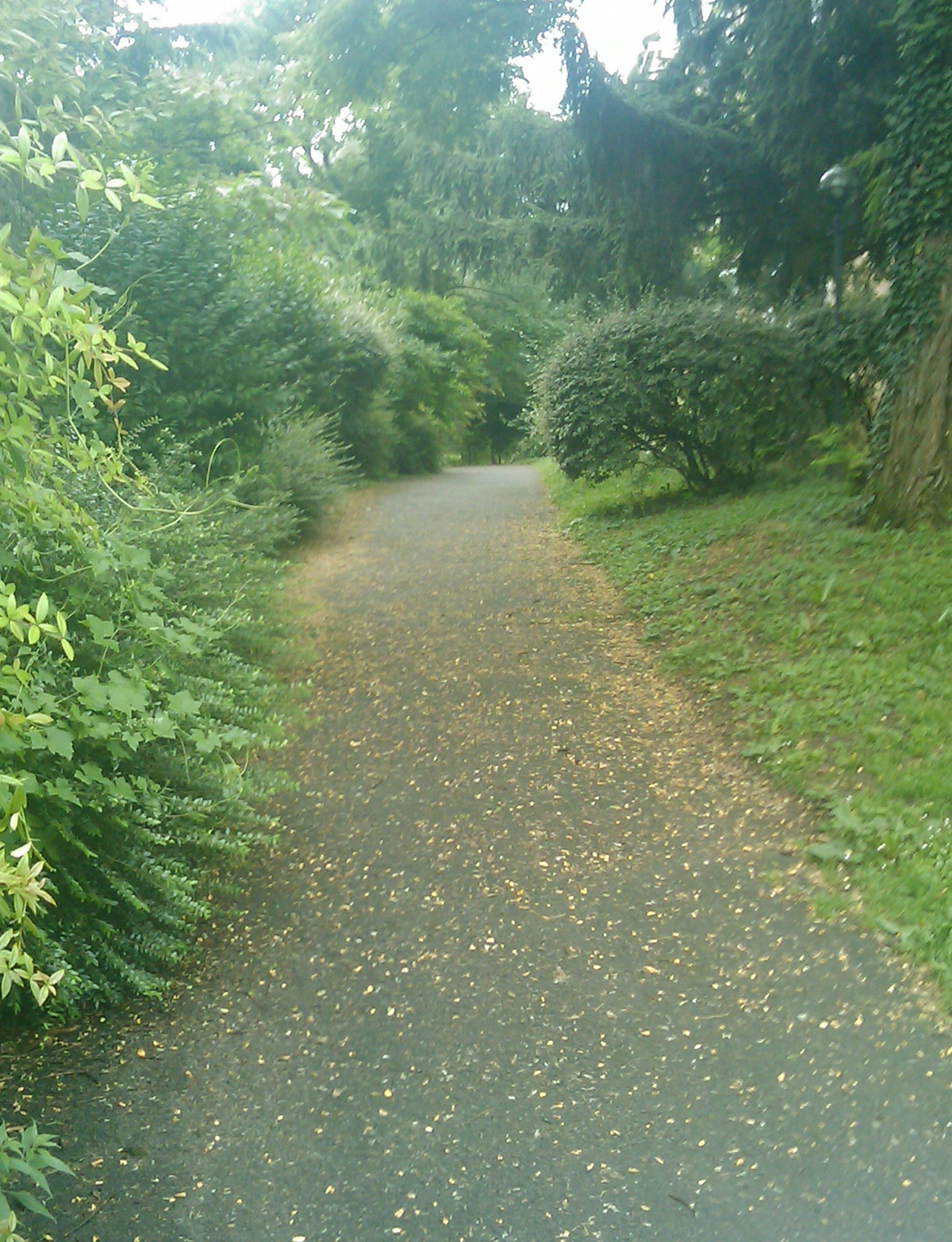
Chemin des marronniers, the chestnut lane at L'Escalade

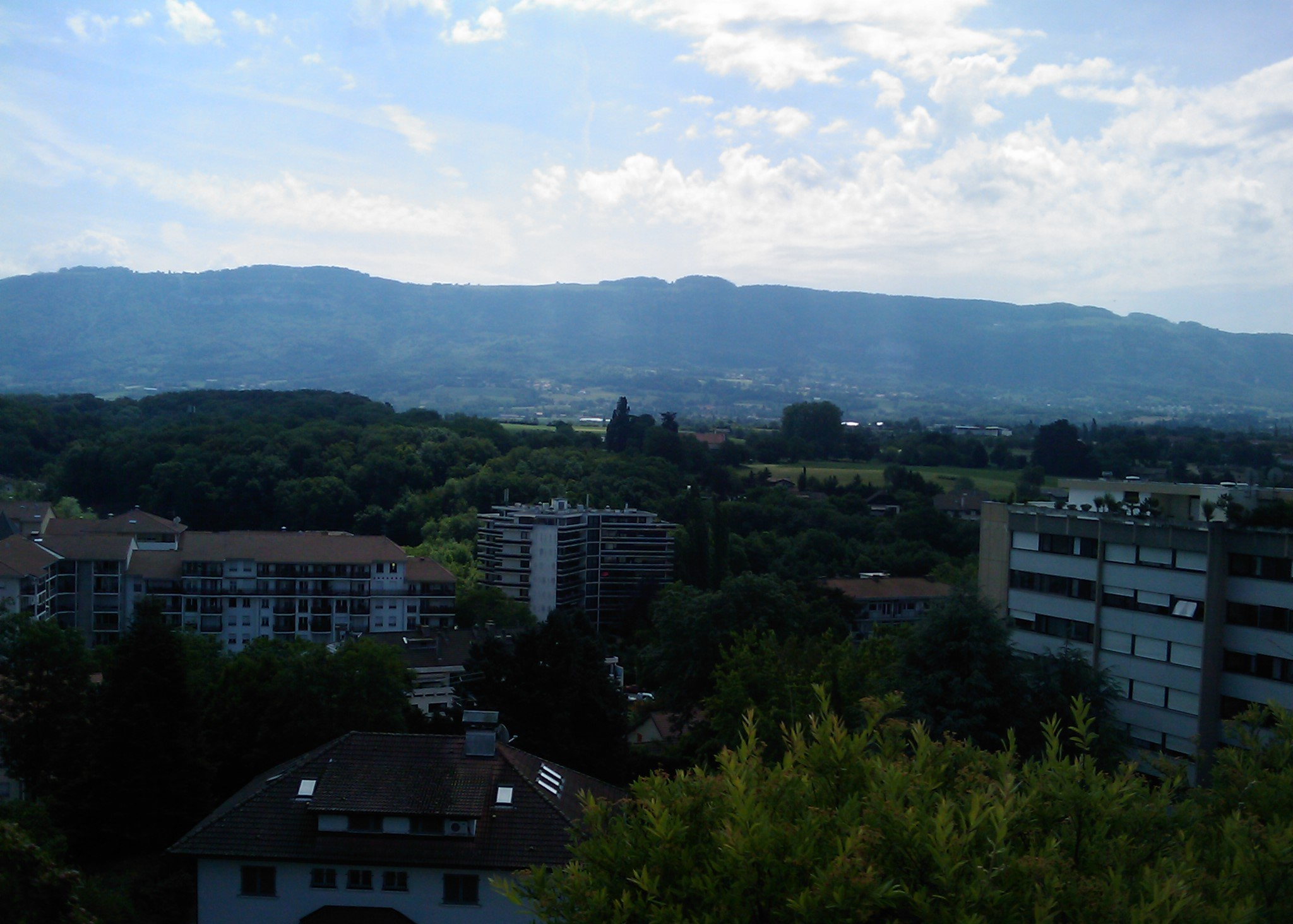
View on the Salève mountain

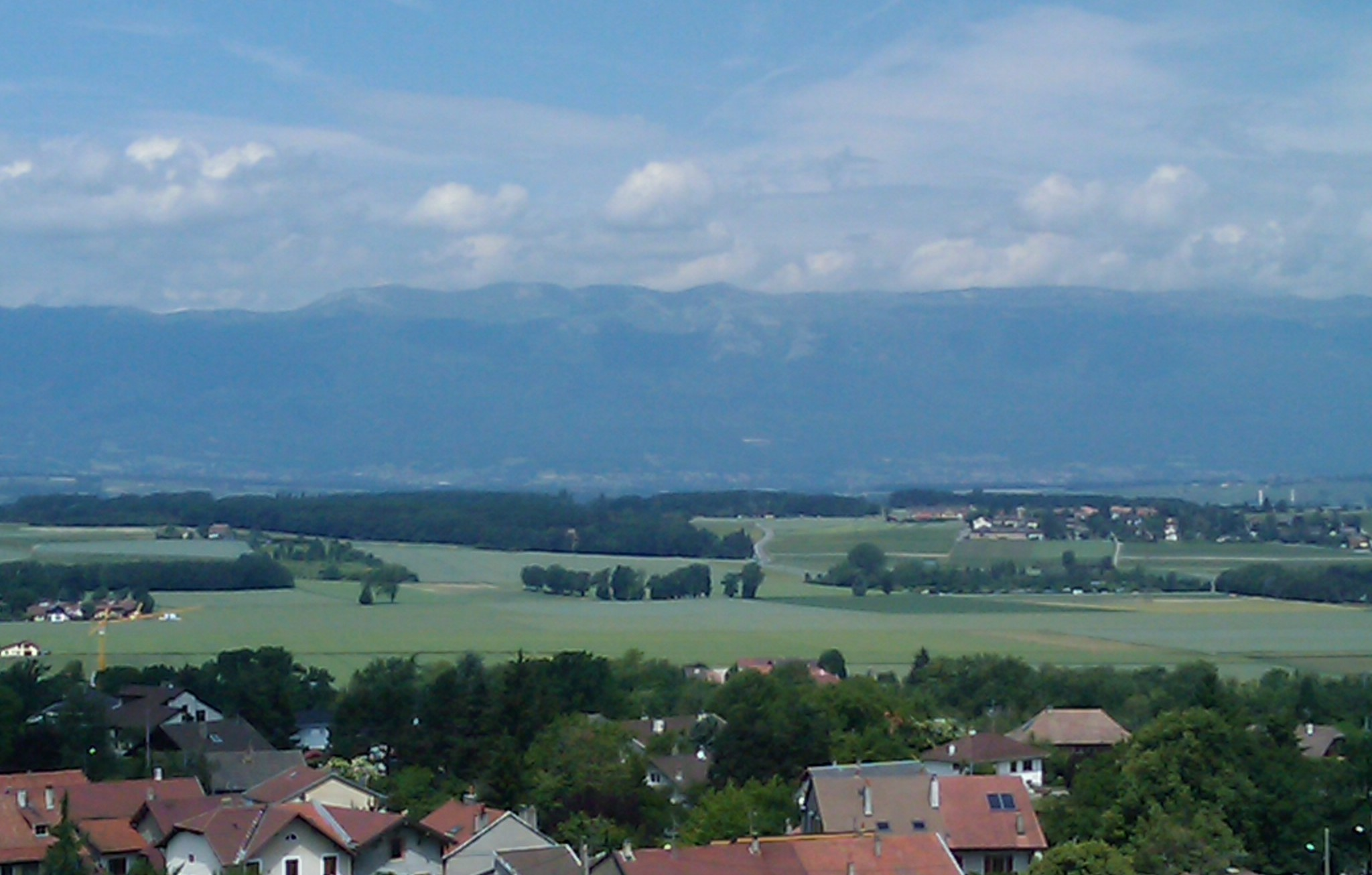
View on the Jura Mountains

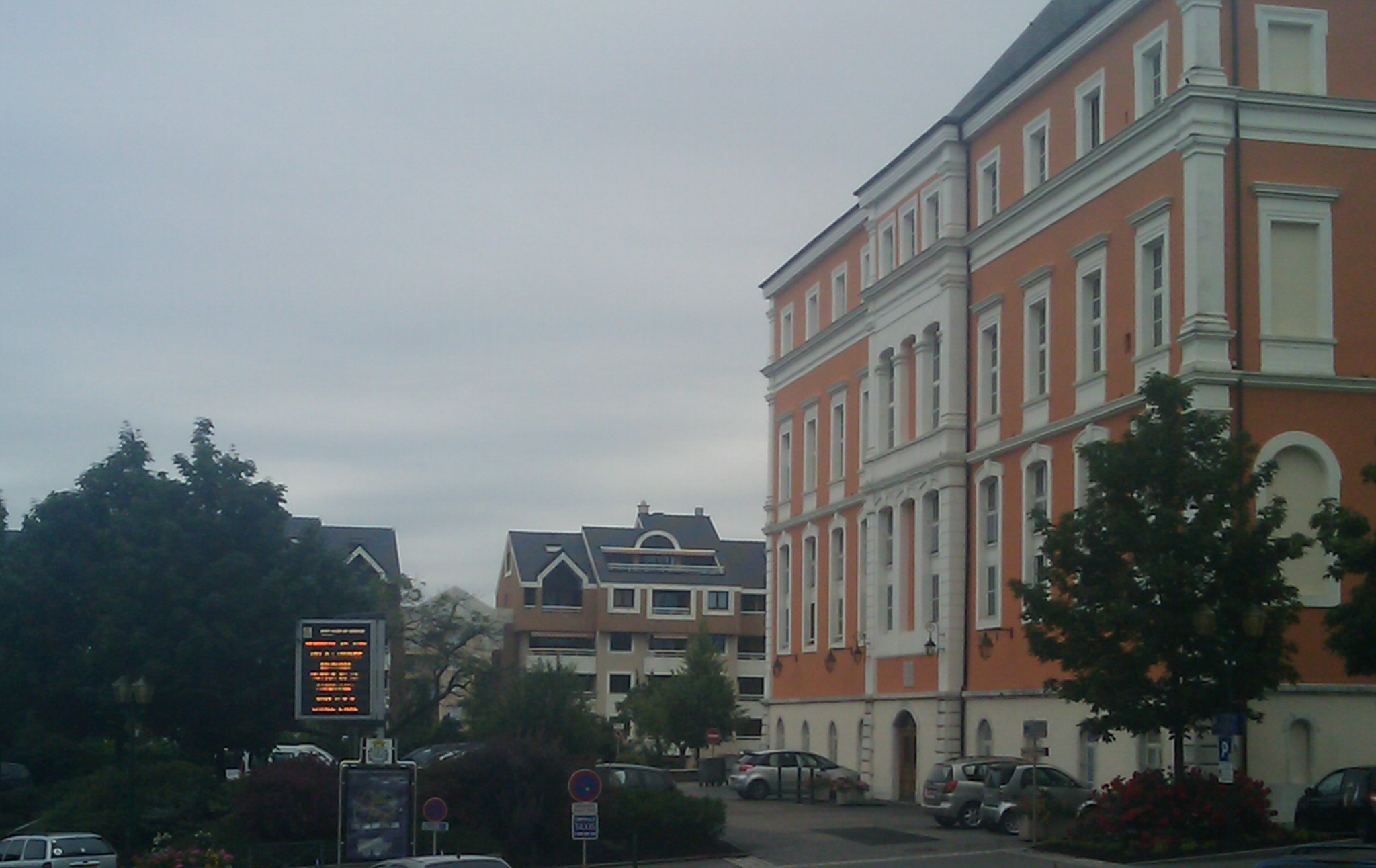
Place du Maquis des Glières et Mairie (western façade)

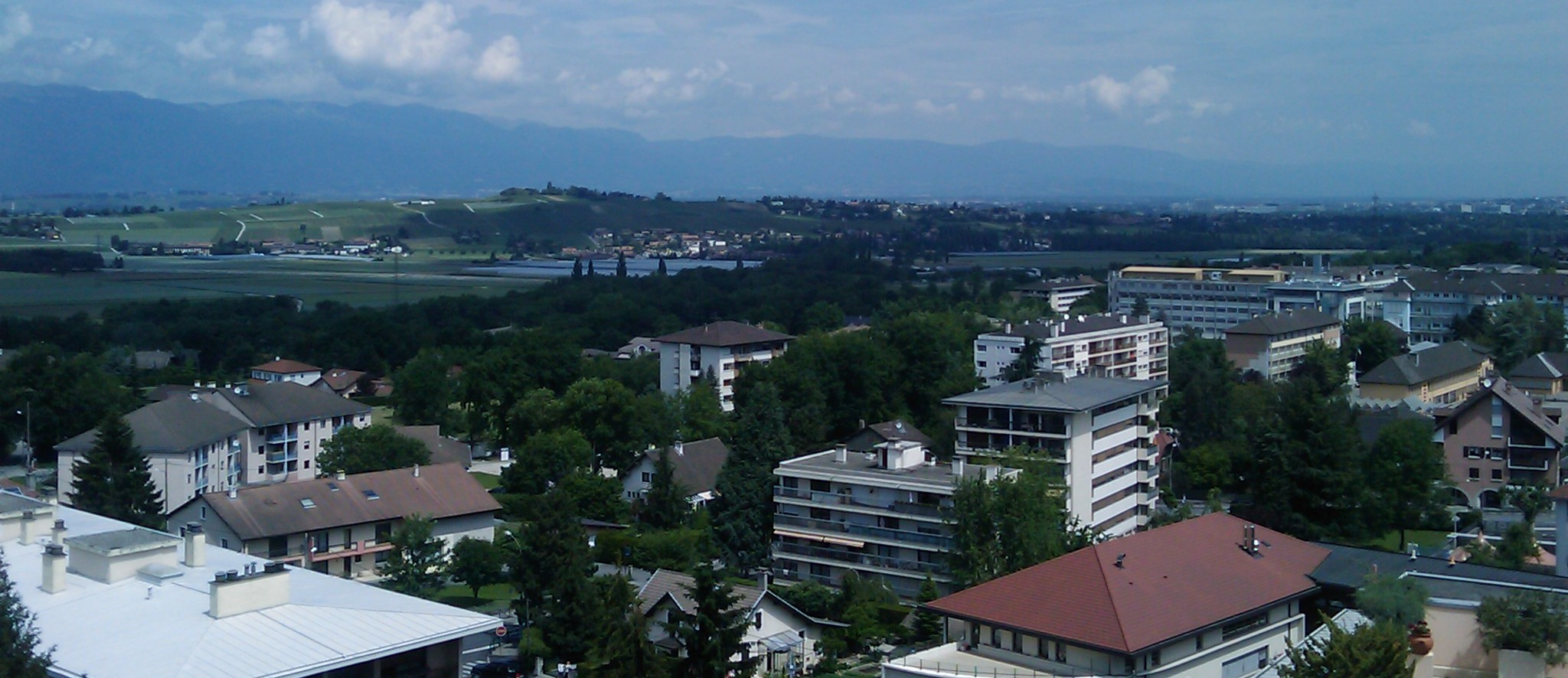
View of the Acacias area and the hospital. In the background, the Geneva countryside and the Jura mountain range.

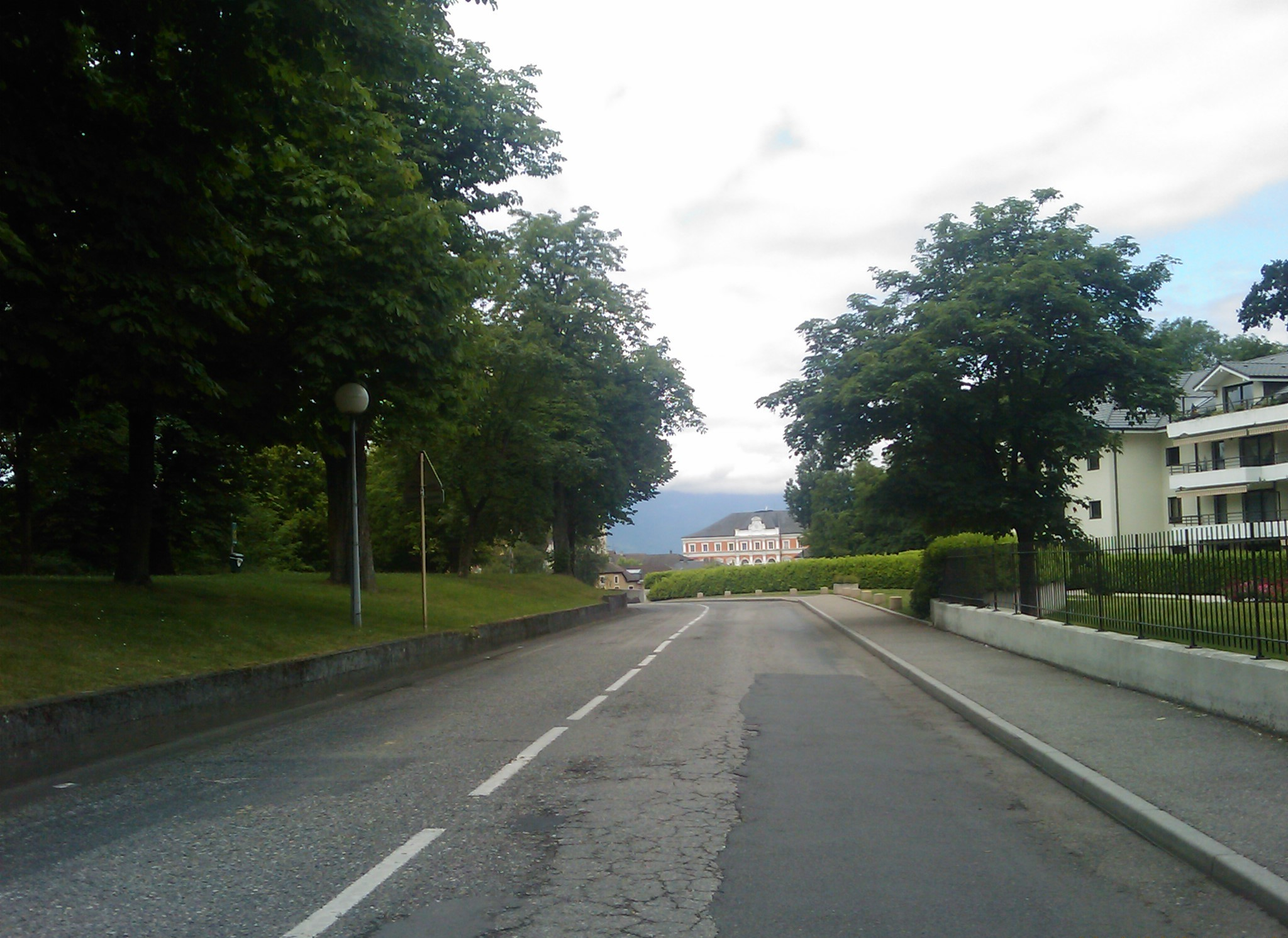
The town hall as seen from the Promenade du Crêt

== See also ==
- Communes of the Haute-Savoie department
