= Frangy =

Frangy Frinzhi (Savoyard)
- Commune
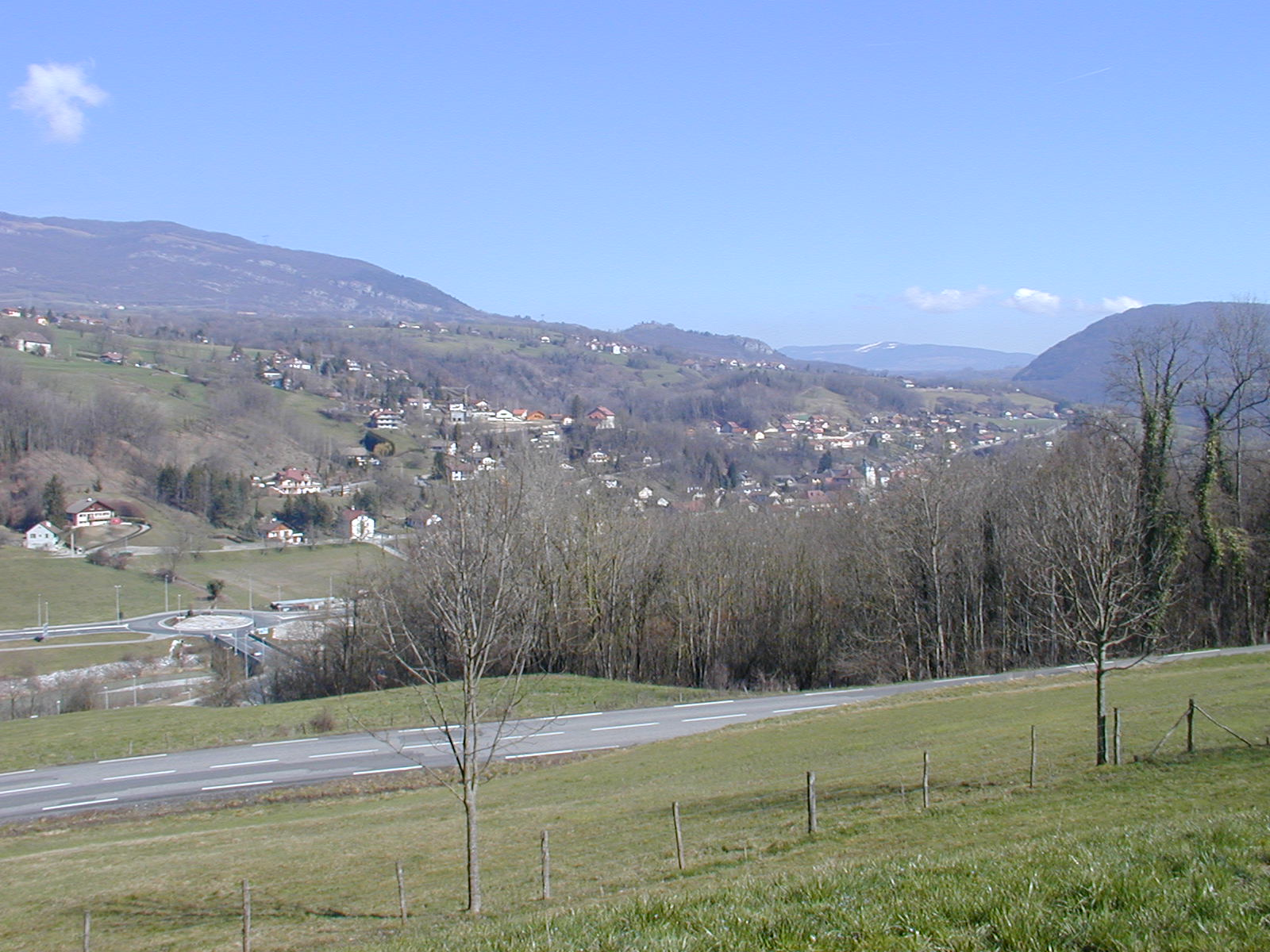
- A view of Frangy from the south-west

- Coat of arms
- Location of Frangy
- Location within France Location within Auvergne-Rhône-Alpes
- Coordinates: 46°01′11″N 5°55′50″E
- Country: France
- Region: Auvergne-Rhône-Alpes
- Department: Haute-Savoie
- Arrondissement: Saint-Julien-en-Genevois
- Canton: Saint-Julien-en-Genevois
- Intercommunality: CC Usses et Rhône

Government
  - Mayor (2022–2026): David Banant
- Area^{1}: 9.69 km^{2} (3.74 sq mi)
- Highest elevation: 562 m (1,844 ft)
- Lowest elevation: 299 m (981 ft)
- Population (2023): 2,262
  - Density: 233/km^{2} (605/sq mi)
- Time zone: UTC+01:00 (CET)
  - Summer (DST): UTC+02:00 (CEST)
- INSEE/Postal code: 74131 /74270
- ^{1} French Land Register data, which excludes lakes, ponds, glaciers > 1 km^{2} (0.386 sq mi or 247 acres) and river estuaries.

Frangy (French pronunciation: [fʁɑ̃ʒi]; Savoyard: Frinzhi) is a commune in the Haute-Savoie department in the Auvergne-Rhône-Alpes region in south-eastern France.

== Population ==
Historical population
| Year | Pop. | ±% p.a. |
|---|---|---|
| 1968 | 1,014 | — |
| 1975 | 1,102 | +1.20% |
| 1982 | 1,333 | +2.76% |
| 1990 | 1,521 | +1.66% |
| 1999 | 1,598 | +0.55% |
| 2007 | 1,928 | +2.37% |
| 2012 | 1,967 | +0.40% |
| 2017 | 2,119 | +1.50% |
| 2023 | 2,262 | +1.09% |
Source: INSEE

== See also ==
- Communes of the Haute-Savoie department

== Culture and heritage ==
- Ferme de Bel-Air (Frangy), 18th century farm, protected as Monument historique since December 7, 2010.
