= Saint-Martin-du-Frêne =

Commune in Auvergne-Rhône-Alpes, France

- Commune
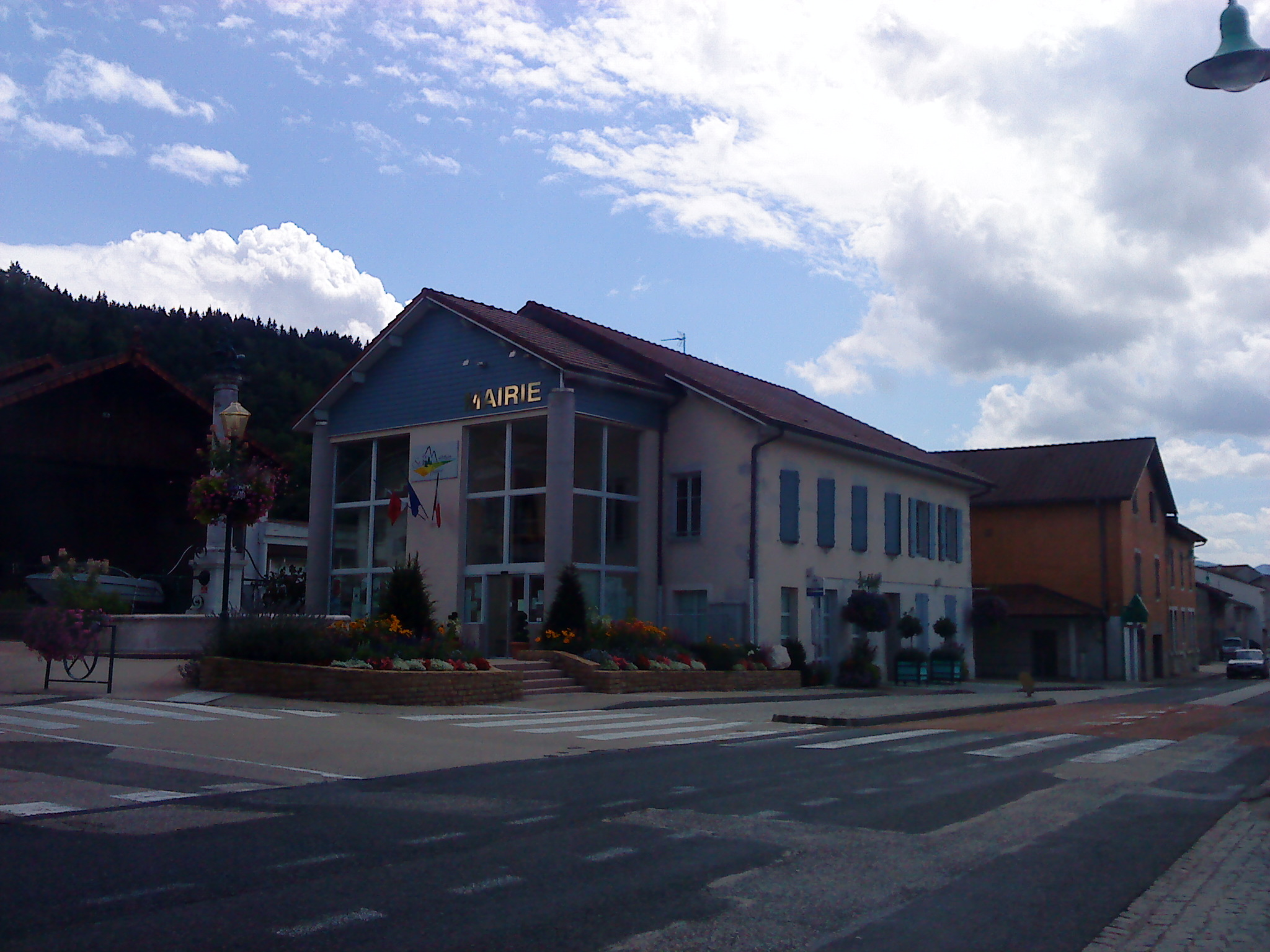
- Town hall
- Location of Saint-Martin-du-Frêne
- Location within France Location within Auvergne-Rhône-Alpes
- Coordinates: 46°08′22″N 5°33′11″E
- Country: France
- Region: Auvergne-Rhône-Alpes
- Department: Ain
- Arrondissement: Nantua
- Canton: Nantua
- Intercommunality: Haut-Bugey Agglomération

Government
  - Mayor (2026–32): Dominique Turc
- Area^{1}: 19.14 km^{2} (7.39 sq mi)
- Elevation: 516 m (1,693 ft)
- Highest elevation: 1,125 m (3,691 ft)
- Lowest elevation: 476 m (1,562 ft)
- Population (2023): 1,023
  - Density: 53.45/km^{2} (138.4/sq mi)
- Time zone: UTC+01:00 (CET)
  - Summer (DST): UTC+02:00 (CEST)
- INSEE/Postal code: 01373 /01430
- ^{1} French Land Register data, which excludes lakes, ponds, glaciers > 1 km^{2} (0.386 sq mi or 247 acres) and river estuaries.

Saint-Martin-du-Frêne (French pronunciation: [sɛ̃ maʁtɛ̃ dy fʁɛn]) is a commune in the Ain department in eastern France.

== Population ==
Historical population
Year	Pop.	±% p.a.
1968	623	—
1975	706	+1.80%
1982	744	+0.75%
1990	971	+3.38%
1999	1,050	+0.87%
2007	1,064	+0.17%
2012	1,098	+0.63%
2017	1,049	−0.91%
2023	1,023	−0.42%
Source: INSEE

== See also ==
- Communes of the Ain department
