= Nantua =

Subprefecture and commune in Auvergne-Rhône-Alpes, France

Nantua Nantuat (Arpitan)
- Subprefecture and commune
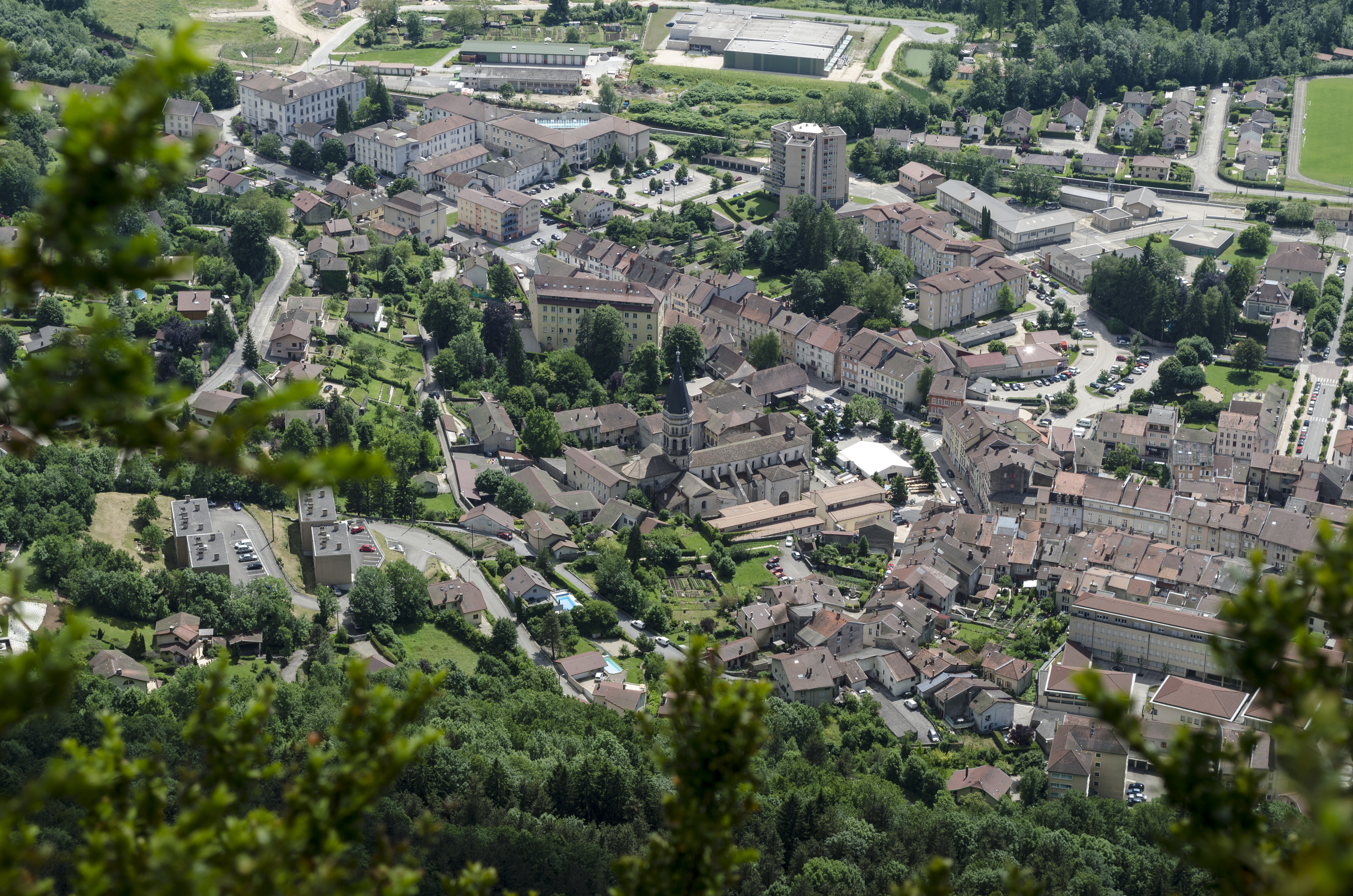
- A view of Nantua

- Coat of arms
- Location of Nantua
- Location within France Location within Auvergne-Rhône-Alpes
- Coordinates: 46°09′07″N 5°36′28″E
- Country: France
- Region: Auvergne-Rhône-Alpes
- Department: Ain
- Arrondissement: Nantua
- Canton: Nantua
- Intercommunality: Haut-Bugey Agglomération

Government
  - Mayor (2026–32): Séverine Debus
- Area^{1}: 12.79 km^{2} (4.94 sq mi)
- Elevation: 479 m (1,572 ft)
- Population (2023): 3,416
  - Density: 267.1/km^{2} (691.7/sq mi)
- Time zone: UTC+01:00 (CET)
  - Summer (DST): UTC+02:00 (CEST)
- INSEE/Postal code: 01269 /01130
- ^{1} French Land Register data, which excludes lakes, ponds, glaciers > 1 km^{2} (0.386 sq mi or 247 acres) and river estuaries.

Nantua (French pronunciation: [nɑ̃tɥa]; Arpitan: Nantuat) is a commune in and subprefecture of the Ain département in the Auvergne-Rhône-Alpes region in Eastern France. The commune of Nantua comprises the glacial Lac de Nantua.

Located in the Haut-Bugey historical region, among the southern foothills of the Jura Mountains, it is famous for its fresh-water fish and crayfish.

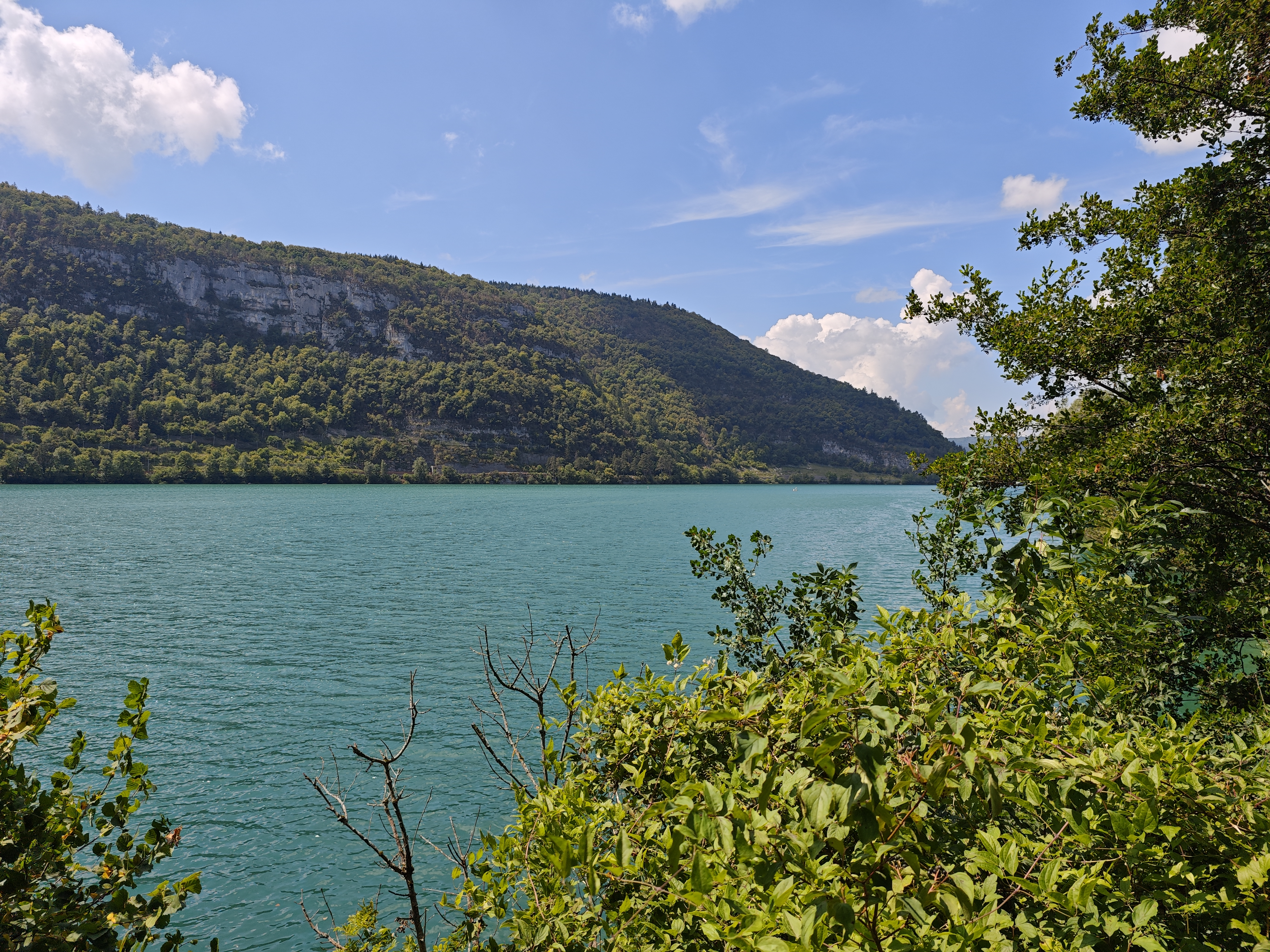
Lake Nantua dominates the town

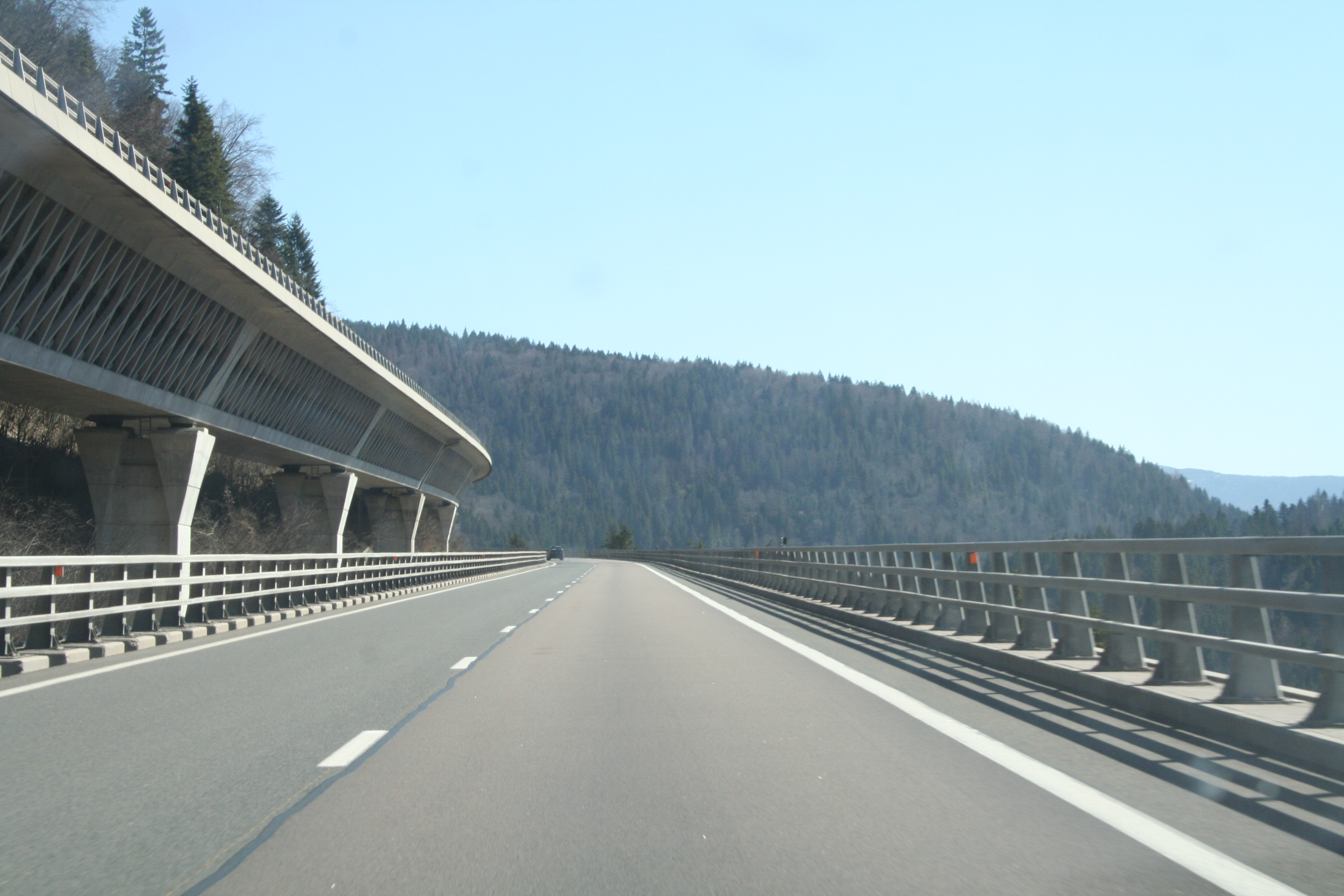
A40 motorway near Nantua

== History ==
The town grew up around a Benedictine monastery founded in 671 by Amandus and the church of St Peter where the body of Charles the Bald was initially buried.

The priory of Nantua was sacked and burned in 1230 by Stephen I of Thoire-Villars. Boniface of Savoy was selected prior in 1232.

In 1944, a hundred men were arrested and deported and the local French Secret Army leader was shot dead by the Nazis in response to French resistance activities.

== Demographics ==
Historical population
Year	Pop.	±% p.a.
1968	3,560	—
1975	3,440	−0.49%
1982	3,572	+0.54%
1990	3,602	+0.10%
1999	3,902	+0.89%
2007	3,663	−0.79%
2012	3,588	−0.41%
2017	3,446	−0.80%
2023	3,416	−0.15%
Source: INSEE

== Climate ==
Nantua faces the small Lac de Nantua on its west side and is protected by high cliffs on its landward sides which gives rise to a relatively mild continental climate.

== Twin towns – sister cities ==
Nantua is twinned with:

- Brembilla, Italy (2011)

== See also ==
- Communes of the Ain department
- Sauce Nantua
