= A39 autoroute =

Road in France

A39 autoroute
- L'Autoroute Verte

Route information
- Maintained by APRR
- Length: 144 km (89 mi)
- Existed: 1992–present

Major junctions
- North end: N 274 / N 5 in Dijon

- E17 / E21 / A 31 in Fauverney; E60 / A 36 in Saint-Seine-en-Bâche; A 391 in Bersaillin

- South end: E21 / E62 / A 40 in Viriat

Location
- Country: France

Highway system
- Roads in France; Autoroutes; Routes nationales

The A39 autoroute, also known as the L'Autoroute Verte, is a motorway in eastern France. The road connects Dijon with Dole and Bourg en Bresse.

== Characteristics ==
- The road is 142 km.
- There are 3 Service Areas
- The road provides quicker travel times between Bourg-en-Bresse and Paris.

== History ==
- 1992 : Opening of section between Dijon and Crimolois (6 km)
- 1994 : Opening of the section between Crimolois and Dole (34 km)
- 1998 : Opening of the section between Dole and Bourg-en-Bresse (110 km)

== List of exits and junctions ==
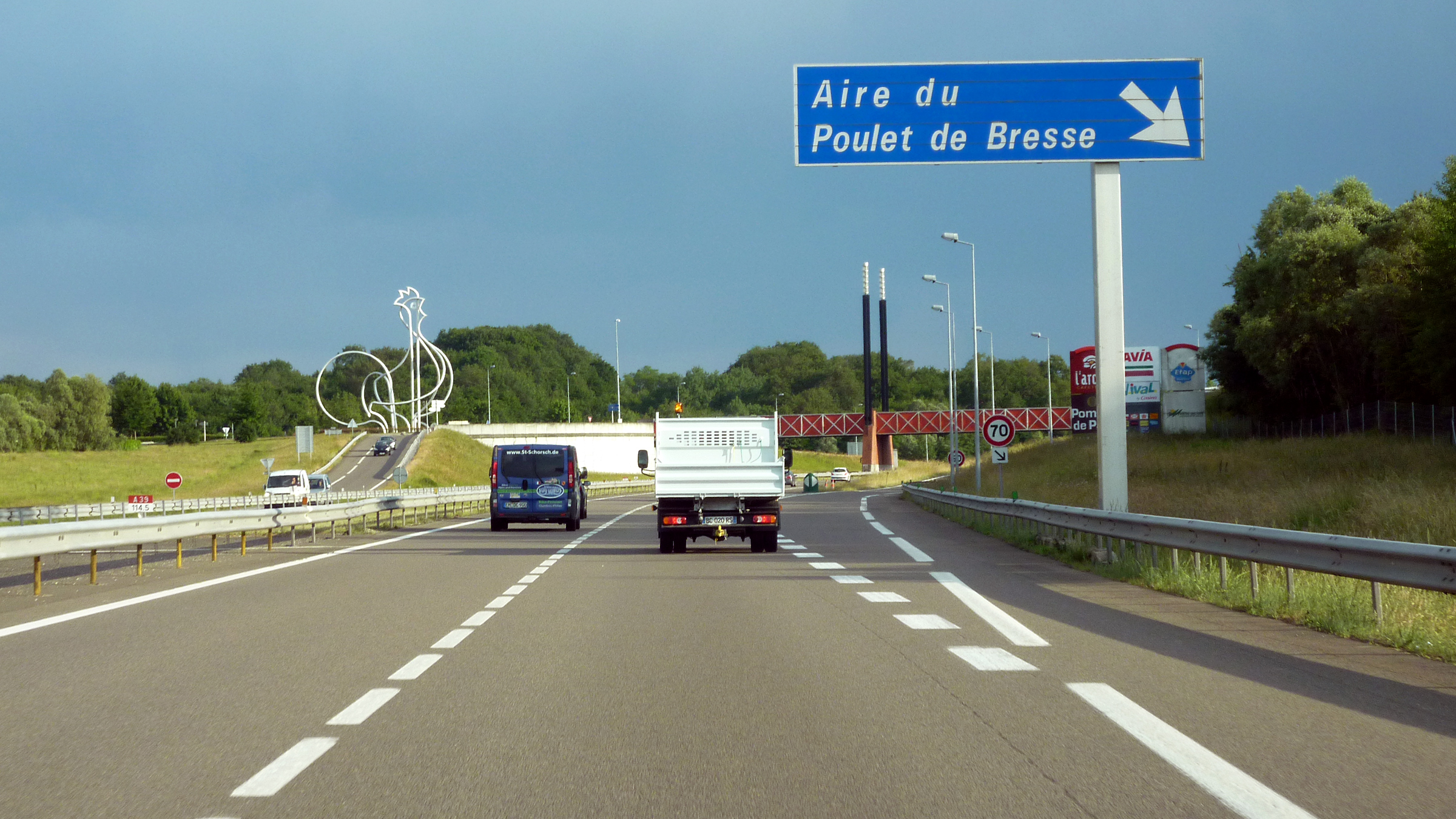
A39 autoroute, Service Area: Le Poulet de Bresse

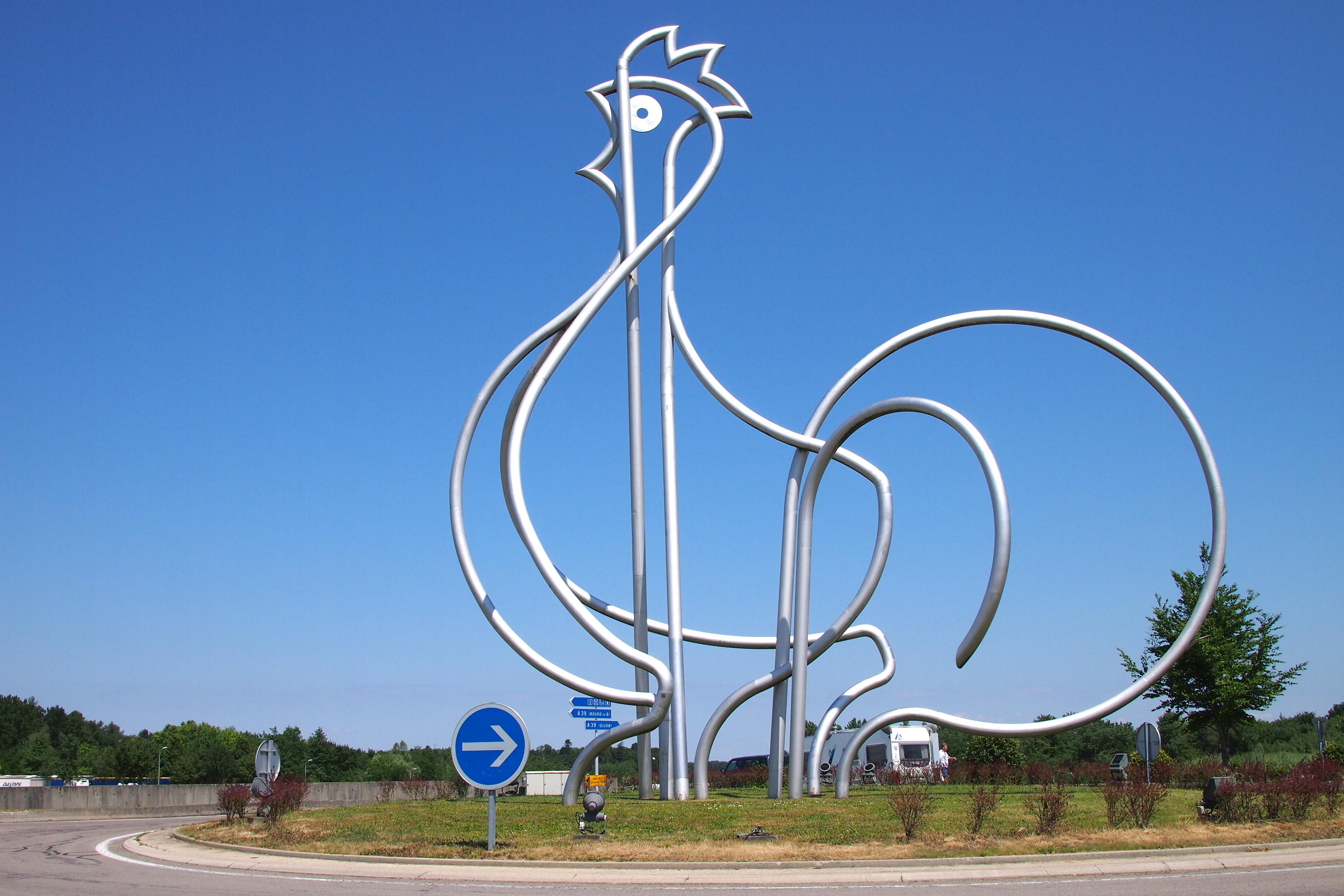
Service Area: Le Poulet de Bresse

Region	Department	Junction	Destinations	Notes
Bourgogne-Franche-Comté	Côte-d'Or	RN 274 & RN 5 - A39	Dijon - centre, Dijon - Université	
Bourgogne-Franche-Comté	Côte-d'Or	RN 274 & RN 5 - A39	Dijon - nord, Dijon - sud, Paris (A38), Quetigny, Lyon, Beaune (A31)	
Bourgogne-Franche-Comté	Côte-d'Or	2 : Neuilly-les-Dijon	Sennecey-lès-Dijon, Neuilly-Crimolois	
Bourgogne-Franche-Comté	Côte-d'Or	3 : Crimolois	Dole, Besançon, Chevigny-Saint-Sauveur, Quetigny, Genlis, Auxonne	
Bourgogne-Franche-Comté	Côte-d'Or	Péage de Crimolois		
Bourgogne-Franche-Comté	Côte-d'Or	A31 - A39	Lille, Paris (A5), Metz-Nancy, Troyes, Chaumont, Beaune	
Bourgogne-Franche-Comté	Côte-d'Or	Aire du Bois-Défendu (Southbound); Aire de Beire-le-Fort (Northbound)		
Bourgogne-Franche-Comté	Côte-d'Or	5 : Soirans	Auxonne, Genlis, Saint-Jean-de-Losne	
Bourgogne-Franche-Comté	Côte-d'Or	Aire du Pont Chêne d'Argent (Southbound); Aire du Pont Val de Saône (Northbound)		
Bourgogne-Franche-Comté	Côte-d'Or	A36 - A39	Paris (A6), Beaune, Strasbourg, Mulhouse, Besançon, Dole - Authume	
Bourgogne-Franche-Comté	Jura	6 : Choisey	Dole - centre, Dole - Choisey, Aéroport de Dole-Jura	
Bourgogne-Franche-Comté	Jura	Aire de La Vouivre (Southbound); Aire de Louis Pasteur (Northbound)		
Bourgogne-Franche-Comté	Jura	Aire de La Jument Verte (Southbound); Aire du Chat Perché (Northbound)		
Bourgogne-Franche-Comté	Jura	7 : Bersaillin ( A391 - A39)	Lausanne, Pontarlier, Lons-le-Saunier par RD, Poligny	
Bourgogne-Franche-Comté	Jura	7.1 : Arlay	Bletterans	
Bourgogne-Franche-Comté	Jura	7.1 : Arlay	Aire du Jura	
Bourgogne-Franche-Comté	Jura	8 : Beaurepaire en Bresse	Lons-le-Saunier, Louhans, Montmorot	
Bourgogne-Franche-Comté	Saône-et-Loire	Aire de La Vallière (Southbound); Aire de Savigny (Northbound)		
Bourgogne-Franche-Comté	Saône-et-Loire	9 : Le Miroir	Cuiseaux, Louhans, Cousance	
Bourgogne-Franche-Comté	Saône-et-Loire	Aire du Poulet de Bresse		
Auvergne-Rhône-Alpes	Ain	10 : Beaupont	Saint-Amour, Saint-Trivier-de-Courtes, Coligny	
Auvergne-Rhône-Alpes	Ain	Aire de Marmont (Southbound); Aire de Beny (Northbound)		
Auvergne-Rhône-Alpes	Ain	A40 - A39	Mâcon, Bourg-en-Bresse, Genève, Grenoble, Lyon (A42)	
A 39 becomes E21 / E62 / A 40
1.000 mi = 1.609 km; 1.000 km = 0.621 mi
