= A36 autoroute =

Road in France

A36 autoroute
- La Comtoise
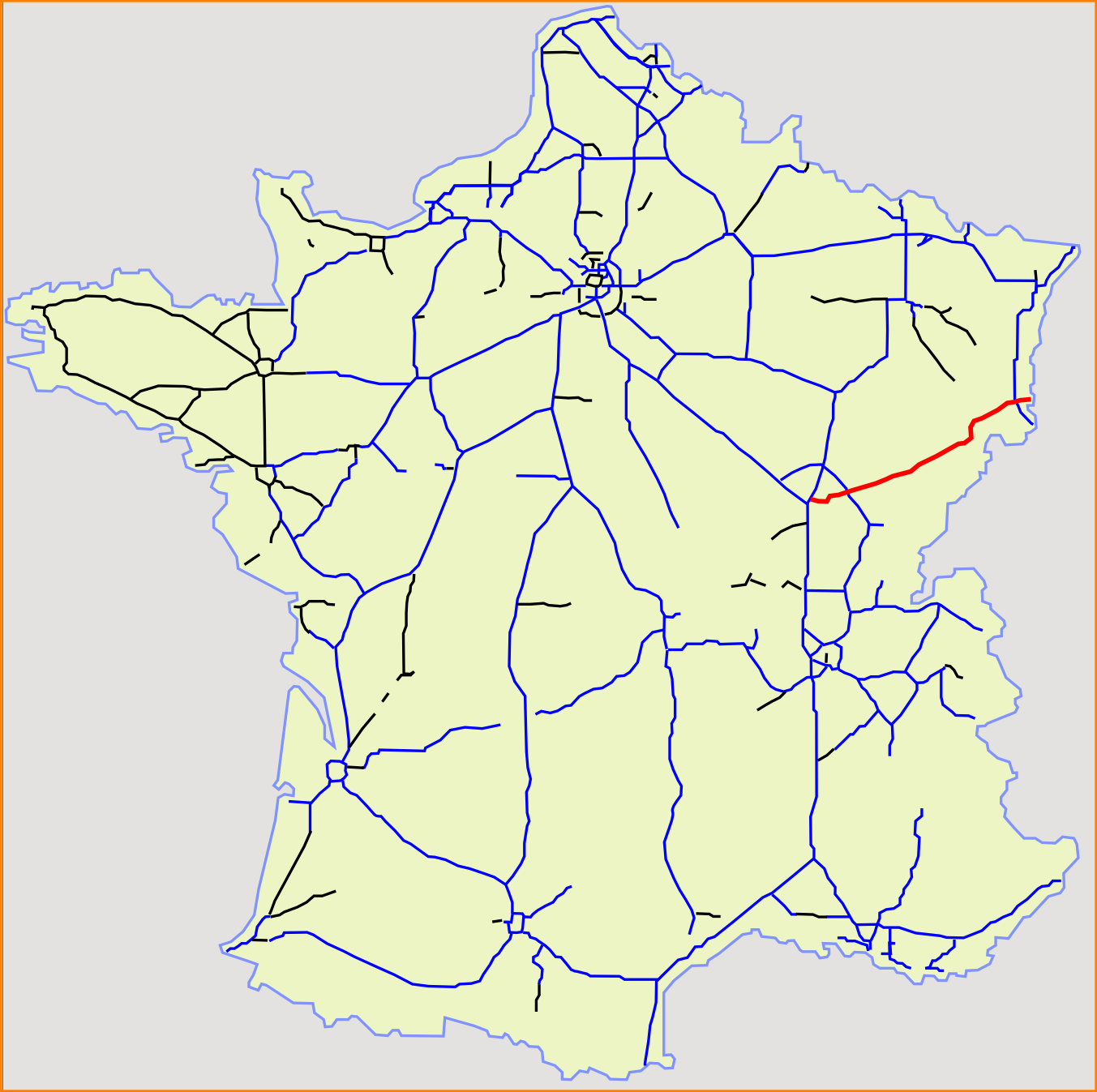

Route information
- Part of E27 / E54 / E60
- Maintained by APRR; Collectivité européenne d'Alsace
- Length: 237 km (147 mi)
- Existed: 1986–present

Major junctions
- West end: E17 / E21 / E60 / A 31 in Ladoix-Serrigny

- A 39 in Dole; E27 / E54 / N 19 in Botans; E25 / E60 / A 35 in Sausheim
- East end: E54 / A 5 in Neuenburg am Rhein, Germany

Location
- Country: France

Highway system
- Roads in France; Autoroutes; Routes nationales

The A36 autoroute is a toll motorway in northeastern France connecting the German border with Bourgogne-Franche-Comté. It is also known as La Comtoise. The road forms part of European route E27, E54 and E60.

== List of exits and junctions ==
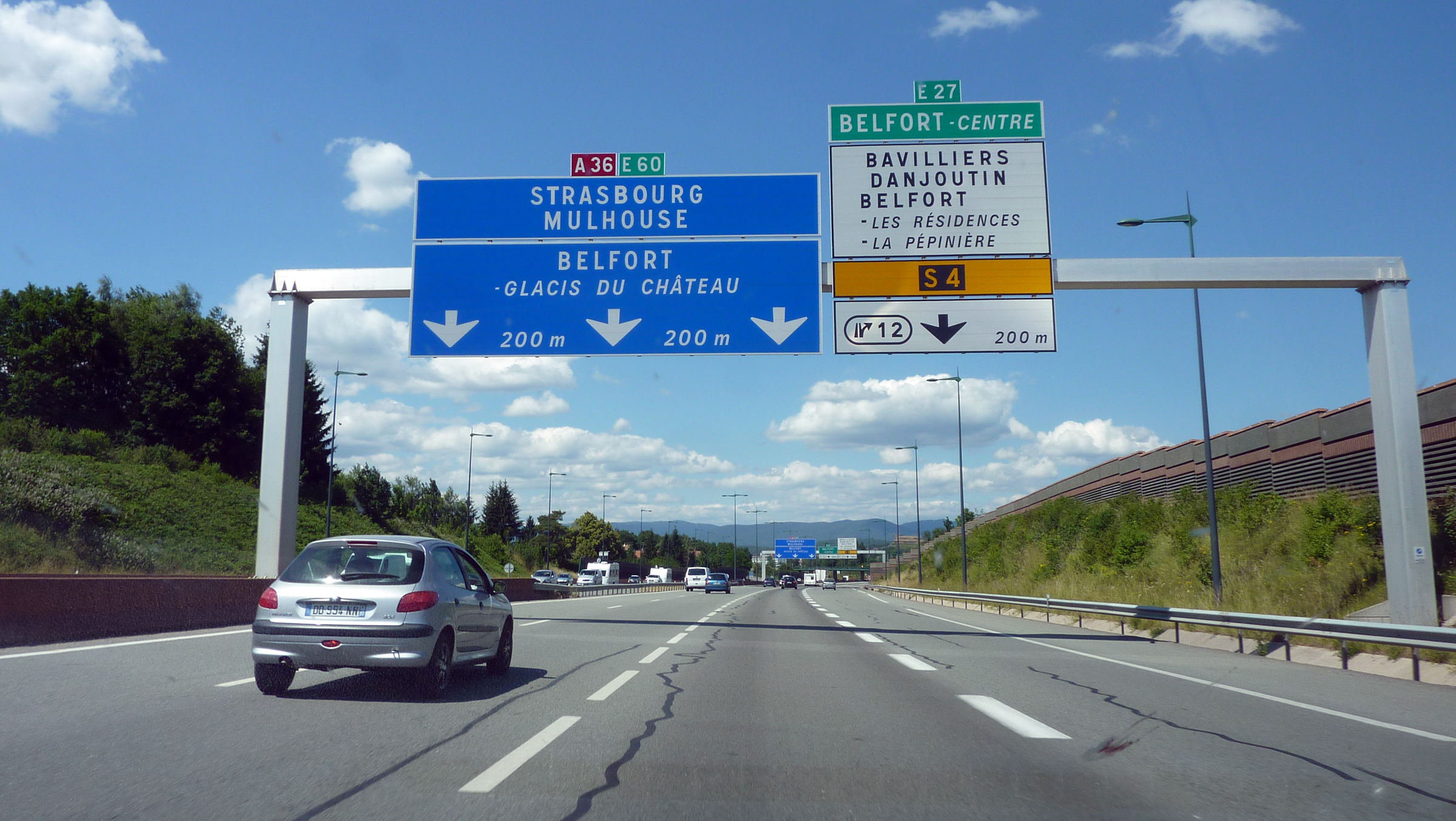
A36 near Belfort

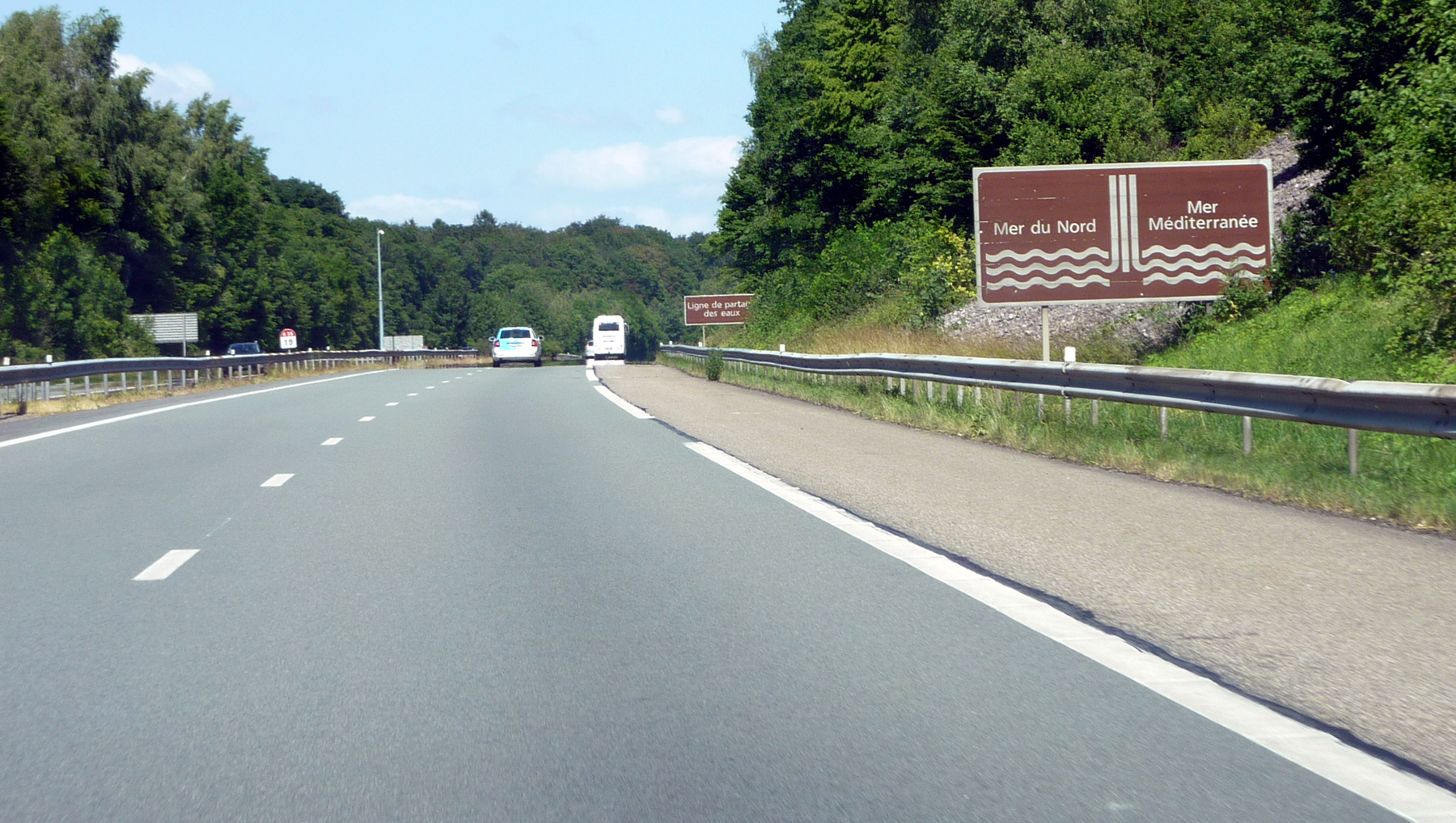
A36 near Mulhouse

| Region | Department | Junction | Destinations | Notes |
|---|---|---|---|---|
| Bourgogne-Franche-Comté | Côte-d'Or | A31 - A36 | Beaune, Lyon, Paris (A6) | |
| Bourgogne-Franche-Comté | Côte-d'Or | Aire de Villy-le-Moutier (Eastbound); Aire d'Argilly (Westbound) | | |
| Bourgogne-Franche-Comté | Côte-d'Or | Aire du Bois Guillerot (Eastbound); Aire de Glanon (Westbound) | | |
| Bourgogne-Franche-Comté | Côte-d'Or | 1 : Seurre | Seurre, Saint-Jean-de-Losne, Nuits-Saint-Georges | |
| Bourgogne-Franche-Comté | Côte-d'Or | Aire des Noues (Eastbound); Aire de St-Jean-de-Losne (Westbound) | | |
| Bourgogne-Franche-Comté | Côte-d'Or | A39 - A36 | Paris (A5), Dijon, Metz-Nancy, Lyon (A40), Grenoble, Genève, Lons-le-Saunier, Dole - Choisey | |
| Bourgogne-Franche-Comté | Jura | | | |
| Bourgogne-Franche-Comté | Jura | Aire de Sampans (Eastbound); Aire du Bois des Potets (Westbound) | | |
| Bourgogne-Franche-Comté | Jura | 2 Dole | Dole - centre, Dole - Authume, Gray | |
| Bourgogne-Franche-Comté | Jura | Aire de Dole-Audelange (Eastbound); Aire de Dole-Romange (Westbound) | | |
| Bourgogne-Franche-Comté | Jura | 2.1 Gendrey | Arc-et-Senans, Dampierre, Gendrey | |
| Bourgogne-Franche-Comté | Jura | Aire de Hyombre (Westbound) | | |
| Bourgogne-Franche-Comté | Doubs | Aire du Bois de Servole (Eastbound) | | |
| Bourgogne-Franche-Comté | Doubs | 3 Besançon - ouest | Lausanne, Pontarlier, Besançon - centre, Besançon - Planoise, Gray | |
| Bourgogne-Franche-Comté | Doubs | Aire du Bois de Frachère (Eastbound); Aire de Pelousey (Westbound) | | |
| Bourgogne-Franche-Comté | Doubs | 4 Besançon - nord | Besançon - centre, Lausanne, Vesoul, Besançon - Saint-Claude | |
| Bourgogne-Franche-Comté | Doubs | Aire de Besançon - Marchaux (Eastbound); Aire de Besançon - Champoux (Westbound) | | |
| Bourgogne-Franche-Comté | Doubs | 4.1 : Besançon - est | Besançon - Palente, Marchaux, Champoux, Roulans | |
| Bourgogne-Franche-Comté | Doubs | Aire de Chevaney (Eastbound); Aire des Grands Brocards (Westbound) | | |
| Bourgogne-Franche-Comté | Doubs | 5 : Baume-les-Dames | Valdahon, Baume-les-Dames, Lure | |
| Bourgogne-Franche-Comté | Doubs | Aire de La Combe de Fougère (Eastbound); Aire du Boulet (Westbound) | | |
| Bourgogne-Franche-Comté | Doubs | Aire du Charme (Eastbound); Aire de Galiot (Westbound) | | |
| Bourgogne-Franche-Comté | Doubs | 6 : L'Isle-sur-le-Doubs | Clerval, L'Isle-sur-le-Doubs | |
| Bourgogne-Franche-Comté | Doubs | Péage de St-Maurice | | |
| Bourgogne-Franche-Comté | Doubs | Aires d'Ecot | | |
| Bourgogne-Franche-Comté | Doubs | 6.1 : Voujeaucourt | Pontarlier, Pont-de-Roide, Bavans, Voujeaucourt, Mathay | |
| Bourgogne-Franche-Comté | Doubs | 7 Audincourt | Audincourt, Valentigney, Bavans, Voujeaucourt, Besançon | |
| Bourgogne-Franche-Comté | Doubs | 8 : Montbéliard | Montbéliard | |
| Bourgogne-Franche-Comté | Doubs | 9 Sochaux - Exincourt | Sochaux, Étupes, Exincourt, Audincourt, Usine Peugeot-Citroën de Sochaux, Musée de l'Aventure Peugeot | |
| Bourgogne-Franche-Comté | Doubs | 10 : Grand-Charmont | Grand-Charmont | |
| Bourgogne-Franche-Comté | Doubs | Aire de Dambenois (Westbound) | | |
| Bourgogne-Franche-Comté | Territoire de Belfort | 11/11a/11b : Sevenans | Delémont, Delle, Gare de Belfort - Montbéliard TGV, Hôpital Nord Franche-Comté, Vesoul, Épinal, Héricourt | |
| Bourgogne-Franche-Comté | Territoire de Belfort | E60 / A 36 becomes E27 / E54 / E60 / A 36 | | |
| Bourgogne-Franche-Comté | Territoire de Belfort | 12/12a/12b Belfort - sud | Belfort - centre, Belfort - Les Résidences, Belfort - La Pépinière, Bavilliers, Danjoutin | |
| Bourgogne-Franche-Comté | Territoire de Belfort | E27 / E54 / E60 / A 36 becomes E54 / E60 / A 36 | | |
| Bourgogne-Franche-Comté | Territoire de Belfort | 13 : Belfort - Glacis-du-Château | Belfort | |
| Bourgogne-Franche-Comté | Territoire de Belfort | 14 : Bessoncourt | Mulhouse, Colmar, Bessoncourt | |
| Bourgogne-Franche-Comté | Territoire de Belfort | Aire de La Forêt (Eastbound); Aire de Les Grands-Prés (Westbound) | | |
| Bourgogne-Franche-Comté | Territoire de Belfort | 14.1 : Fonatine | Fontaine, Masevaux, Giromagny | |
| Bourgogne-Franche-Comté | Territoire de Belfort | Péage de Fontaine - Larivière | | |
| Bourgogne-Franche-Comté | Territoire de Belfort | Aire du Haut Bois (Eastbound); Aire d'Angeot (Westbound) | | |
| Grand Est | Haut-Rhin | Aire de la Porte d'Alsace | | |
| Grand Est | Haut-Rhin | 15 : Burnhaupt | Colmar, Guebwiller, Belfort par RD, Masevaux, Thann-Cernay, Altkirch, Burnhaupt-le-Bas, Burnhaupt-le-Haut | |
| Grand Est | Haut-Rhin | 16/16a/16b : Mulhouse - Les Coteaux | Mulhouse, Brunstatt, Morschwiller-le-Bas, Altkirch, Épinal, Thann, Cernay, Wittelsheim, Lutterbach | |
| Grand Est | Haut-Rhin | 17 : Mulhouse Dornach | Mulhouse, Pfastatt, Lutterbach | |
| Grand Est | Haut-Rhin | 18/18a/18b: Mulhouse - Bourtzwiller | Mulhouse - centre, Guebwiller, Wittenheim, Kingersheim, Illzach - centre, Riedisheim, Parc des Expositions | |
| Grand Est | Haut-Rhin | 19 : Mulhouse - centre | Mulhouse, Riedisheim, Parc des Expositions | |
| Grand Est | Haut-Rhin | 20 : Île Napoléon | Sausheim, Illzach - Modenheim | |
| Grand Est | Haut-Rhin | A35 - A36 | Strasbourg, Colmar, Bâle, Euroairport | |
| Grand Est | Haut-Rhin | E54 / E60 / A 36 becomes again E60 / A 36 | | |
| Grand Est | Haut-Rhin | 21 : Usine Peugeot-Citröen | Usine Peugeot-Citroën de Mulhouse | |
| Grand Est | Haut-Rhin | 22 : Ottmarsheim | Ottmarsheim | |
French - German Border ; E54 / A 36 joins E54 / A 5
1.000 mi = 1.609 km; 1.000 km = 0.621 mi
