= A31 autoroute =

Road in France

A31 autoroute
- Autoroute de Lorraine-Bourgogne
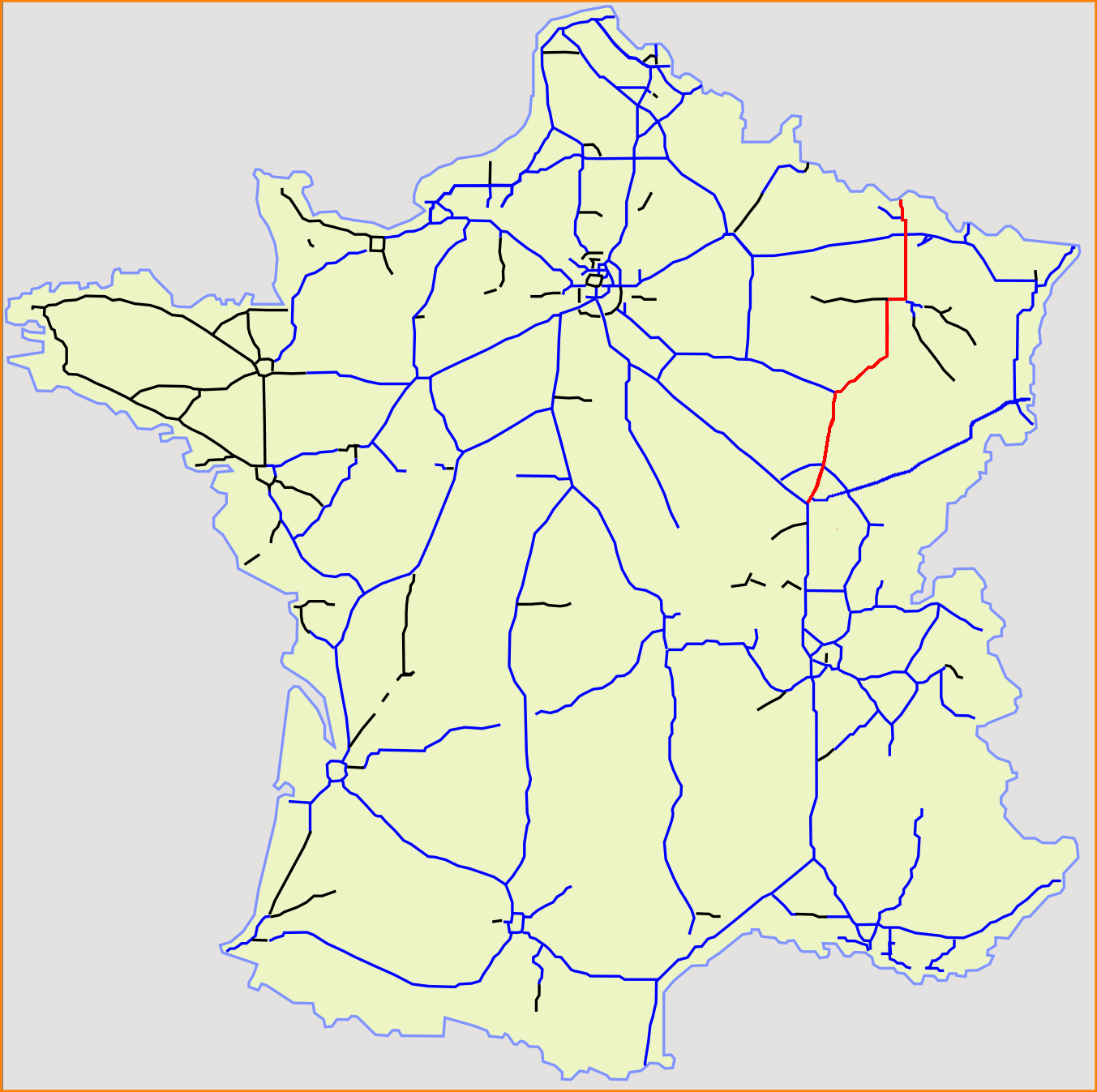

Route information
- Part of E17 / E21 / E23 / E25 / E54 / E60
- Maintained by APRR and DIR Est
- Length: 349 km (217 mi)
- Existed: 1966–present

Major junctions
- South end: E15 / E21 / E60 / A 6 in Beaune

- E60 / A 36 in Ladoix-Serrigny; A 311 in Perrigny-lès-Dijon; A 39 in Fauverney; E17 / E54 / A 5 in Beauchemin; E23 / A 33 in Laxou; E25 / E50 / A 4 in Hauconcourt; E411 / A 30 in Sausheim
- North end: A 3 / E25 in Zoufftgen

Location
- Country: France

Highway system
- Roads in France; Autoroutes; Routes nationales

The A31 autoroute, also known as l'Autoroute de Lorraine-Bourgogne, is a French motorway. The road runs from Beaune to the Franco-Luxembourg border where it joins the A3. The northern part of the autoroute is free, as far as the town of Toul, but is a toll road south of there. The autoroute serves the cities of Metz, Nancy, and Dijon and is heavily used in the holiday season as it is a convenient route for those travelling from Belgium, the Netherlands, Luxembourg, and Germany to the south of France.

== List of junctions ==
Region	Department	Junction	Destinations	Notes
Bourgogne-Franche-Comté	Côte-d'Or	A6 - A31	Paris, Auxerre, Beaune, Lyon, Chalon-sur-Saône	
Bourgogne-Franche-Comté	Côte-d'Or	A36 - A31	Dole, Besançon, Mulhouse, Strasbourg	
Bourgogne-Franche-Comté	Côte-d'Or	E17 / E21 / E60 / A 31 becomes E17 / E21 / A 31		
Bourgogne-Franche-Comté	Côte-d'Or	Aire de Corgoloin (Northbound); Aire de Serrigny (Southbound)		
Bourgogne-Franche-Comté	Côte-d'Or	1 : Nuits St Georges	Nuits St Georges	
Bourgogne-Franche-Comté	Côte-d'Or	Aire de Boncourt-le-Bois (Northbound); Aire de Flagey-Échezeaux (Southbound)		
Bourgogne-Franche-Comté	Côte-d'Or	Aire de Gevrey-Chambertin		
Bourgogne-Franche-Comté	Côte-d'Or	A311 - A31	Dijon	
Bourgogne-Franche-Comté	Côte-d'Or	A39 - A31	Dijon - sud, Dole, Besançon, Mulhouse, Genève, Grenoble	
Bourgogne-Franche-Comté	Côte-d'Or	Aire du Pré d'Azur (Northbound); Aire de La Tille (Southbound)		
Bourgogne-Franche-Comté	Côte-d'Or	4 : Arc-sur-Tille	Arc-sur-Tille, Saint-Apollinaire, Gray, Dijon - centre, Vesoul	
Bourgogne-Franche-Comté	Côte-d'Or	Aire de Dijon Spoy (Northbound); Aire de Dijon Brognon (Southbound)		
Bourgogne-Franche-Comté	Côte-d'Or	5 : Til-Châtel	Til-Châtel, Selongey, Is-sur-Tille, Châtillon-sur-Seine	
Bourgogne-Franche-Comté	Côte-d'Or	Aire de La Villa des Tuillères (Northbound); Aire de la Sainte Gertrude (Southbound)		
Grand Est	Haute-Marne	Aire de La Combe Suzon (Northbound); Aire de Fontenelle (Southbound)		
Grand Est	Haute-Marne	6 : Langres - sud	Langres, Gray, Châtillon-sur-Seine	
Grand Est	Haute-Marne	Aire de Langres Noidant (Northbound); Aire de Langres Perrogney (Southbound)		
Grand Est	Haute-Marne	A5 - A31	Paris, Lille, Troyes, Chaumont	
Grand Est	Haute-Marne	E17 / E21 / A 31 becomes E21 / E54 / A 31		
Grand Est	Haute-Marne	7 : Langres-nord	Nogent, Langres, Vesoul	
Grand Est	Haute-Marne	E17 / E21 / E54 / A 31 becomes E17 / E21 / A 31		
Grand Est	Haute-Marne	Aire du Val de Gris (Northbound); Aire de La Côte Robert (Southbound)		
Grand Est	Haute-Marne	Aire du Val de Meuse (Northbound); Aire de Montigny-le-Roi (Southbound)		
Grand Est	Haute-Marne	8 : Montigny le Roi	Montigny-le-Roi, Nogent, Bourbonne-les-Bains, Chaumont	
Grand Est	Vosges	8.1 : Robécourt	Bourmont, Lamarche	
Grand Est	Vosges	8.1 : Robécourt	Aire du Bois de Chaumont (Northbound); Aire du Grand Repenti (Southbound)	
Grand Est	Vosges	9 : Bulgnéville	Bulgnéville, Vittel, Contrexéville, Épinal	
Grand Est	Vosges	Aire de Lorraine Sandaucourt-lès-Rappes (Northbound); Aire de Lorraine Sandaucourt la Trelle (Southbound)		
Grand Est	Vosges	10 : Châtenois	Châtenois, Mirecourt, Neufchâteau, Épinal	
Grand Est	Vosges	Aire du Val au Renard (Northbound); Aire de Grand Chêne (Southbound)		
Grand Est	Meurthe-et-Moselle	Aire de Malvaux (Northbound); Aire de Faverosse (Southbound)		
Grand Est	Meurthe-et-Moselle	11 : Colombey les Belles	Colombey-les-Belles, Neuves-Maisons, Neufchâteau, Charmes	
Grand Est	Meurthe-et-Moselle	Peáge de Gye		
Grand Est	Meurthe-et-Moselle	12 : Gye ( RN 4 - A31)	Toul - centre, Paris, Reims, Troyes par RN, Bar-le-Duc	
Grand Est	Meurthe-et-Moselle	13 : Toul - sud	Toul - Valcourt, Chaumont, Dijon	
Grand Est	Meurthe-et-Moselle	Aire de Toul Chaudenay (Northbound); Aire de Toul Dommartin (Southbound)		
Grand Est	Meurthe-et-Moselle	14 : Toul - nord	Toul - Croix de Metz, Toul - Z. I, Verdun	
Grand Est	Meurthe-et-Moselle	15 : Dommartin-lès-Toul	Toul, Dommartin-lès-Toul	
Grand Est	Meurthe-et-Moselle	16 : Gondreville	Gondreville, Velaine-en-Haye, Z. A. Internationale Gondreville-Fontenoy	
Grand Est	Meurthe-et-Moselle	Aire de La Forêt de Haye(Northbound)		
Grand Est	Meurthe-et-Moselle	17 : Les Cinq Tranchées	Verlaine-en-Haye, Parc de Haye, Sites Saint Jacques	
Grand Est	Meurthe-et-Moselle	A33 - A31	Strasbourg, Besançon, Épinal, Lunéville, Nancy - sud, CHRU de Nancy - Hôpitaux de Nancy-Brabois, Vandœuvre-lès-Nancy	
Grand Est	Meurthe-et-Moselle	E21 / A 31 becomes E21 / E23 / A 31		
Grand Est	Meurthe-et-Moselle	18 : Laxou	Laxou, Nancy - centre, Nancy - Gentilly	
Grand Est	Meurthe-et-Moselle	19 : Nancy-Gentilly	Laxou, Nancy, Maxéville - Champ le Bœuf, Maxéville - Saint-Jacques	
Grand Est	Meurthe-et-Moselle	20 : Nancy - Centre-Gare	Nancy, Maxéville	
Grand Est	Meurthe-et-Moselle	21 : Maxéville	Nancy - centre, Nancy - Rives de Meurthe, Maxéville	
Grand Est	Meurthe-et-Moselle	22 : Frouard	Champigneulles, Frouard, Pompey, Liverdun	
Grand Est	Meurthe-et-Moselle	23 : Bouxières	Sarreguemines, Bouxières-aux-Dames, Malzéville, Nancy - est	
Grand Est	Meurthe-et-Moselle	24 : Custines	Custines, Pompey	
Grand Est	Meurthe-et-Moselle	25 : Belleville	Belleville, Dieulouard, Pompey	
Grand Est	Meurthe-et-Moselle	Aire de Loisy (Northbound); Aire de L'Obrion (Southbound)		
Grand Est	Meurthe-et-Moselle	A313 - A31 ( 26 )	Pont-à-Mousson - sud, Verdun	
Grand Est	Meurthe-et-Moselle	27 : Atton	Atton, Nomeny	
Grand Est	Meurthe-et-Moselle	Aire du Bois du Juré (Northbound); Aire de Lesménils (Southbound)		
Grand Est	Meurthe-et-Moselle	28 : Lorraine	Lesménils, Pont-à-Mousson - nord, Saint-Avold, Aéroport régional, Gare Lorraine TGV	
Grand Est	Moselle	29 : Féy	Féy, Marly, Pagny-sur-Moselle, Metz - est, Saarbrücken, Lac de Madine	
Grand Est	Moselle	30/30a/30b : Jouy-aux-Arches	Jouy-aux-Arches, Ars-sur-Moselle, Marly, Zone Actisud	
Grand Est	Moselle	31 : Moulins-lès-Metz	Moulins-lès-Metz, Montigny-lès-Metz, Briey, Ars-sur-Moselle, Verdun, Charleville-Mézières	
Grand Est	Moselle	32 : Metz - centre	Metz - Centre-Gare, Montigny-lès-Metz, Technopole	
Grand Est	Moselle	33 : Metz - nord	Metz - nord, Strasbourg, Sarrebrücken, Woippy, Pontiffroy, Zones Industrielles	
Grand Est	Moselle	34 : La Maxe	Woippy, La Maxe, Port de Metz	
Grand Est	Moselle	Aire de La Maxe (Northbound); Aire de Saint-Rémy (Southbound)		
Grand Est	Moselle	A4 - A31	Paris, Verdun, Reims, Strasbourg, Saarbrücken, Metz - est, Amnéville - Walygator Parc	
Grand Est	Moselle	E21 / E23 / E60 / A 31 becomes E25 / A 31		
Grand Est	Moselle	35 : Maizières-lès-Metz	Maizières-lès-Metz, Hauconcourt, Ennery	
Grand Est	Moselle	36 : Talange	Talange, Hagondange	
Grand Est	Moselle	37 : Mondelange	Mondelange, Amnéville, Richemont, Ennery, Bousse	
Grand Est	Moselle	A30 - A31	Longwy, Hayange, Florange, Fameck, Uckange	
Grand Est	Moselle	37.1 : Bertrange	Guénange, Bertrange, Uckange	
Grand Est	Moselle	37.2 : Illange	Illange, Yutz - est, Bouzonville, Trèves, Sarrelouis	
Grand Est	Moselle	38 : Yutz	Yutz - centre, Thionville - centre, Illange	
Grand Est	Moselle	39 : Thionville - Beauregard	Thionville, Terville, Uckange	
Grand Est	Moselle	40 : Thionville - ouest	Bel Air, Thionville - Linkling, Cattenom, Mondorf-les-Bains	
Grand Est	Moselle	41 : Terville	Terville, Florange	
Grand Est	Moselle	42 : Bétange	Hayange, Florange, Briey, Bétange	
Grand Est	Moselle	43 : Thionville - Elange	Thionville - ouest, Nilvange, Algrange, Longwy	
Grand Est	Moselle	Aire d'Entrange (Northbound); Aire de Thionville - Porte de France (Southbound)		
Grand Est	Moselle	44 : Kanfen	Hettange-Grande, Kanfen, Volmerange-les-Mines	
French - Luxembourg Border ; E25 / A 31 becomes E25 / A 3
1.000 mi = 1.609 km; 1.000 km = 0.621 mi

== Future ==
There is a proposal to create a new autoroute, the A32, to relieve congestion on the A31 but the scheme is currently stalled owing to vigorous opposition.
