= A33 autoroute =

Road in France

A33 autoroute

Route information
- Part of E23
- Maintained by DIR Est
- Length: 26.8 km (16.7 mi)
- Existed: 1972–present

Major junctions
- West end: E21 / E23 / A 31 in Laxou

- E23 / A 330 in Ludres
- East end: N 4 in Hudiviller

Location
- Country: France

Highway system
- Roads in France; Autoroutes; Routes nationales

The A33 autoroute is a 26.8 kilometres (16.7 mi) long motorway in northeastern France. It forms part of European route E23.

== Route ==
The road is only 27 km (17 mi) long and connects Nancy to Dombasle-sur-Meurthe. After Lunéville the road becomes the N333 to Blâmont. The road forms an upgrade of the N4 which is now called the N4a.

== Lists of Exits and junctions ==
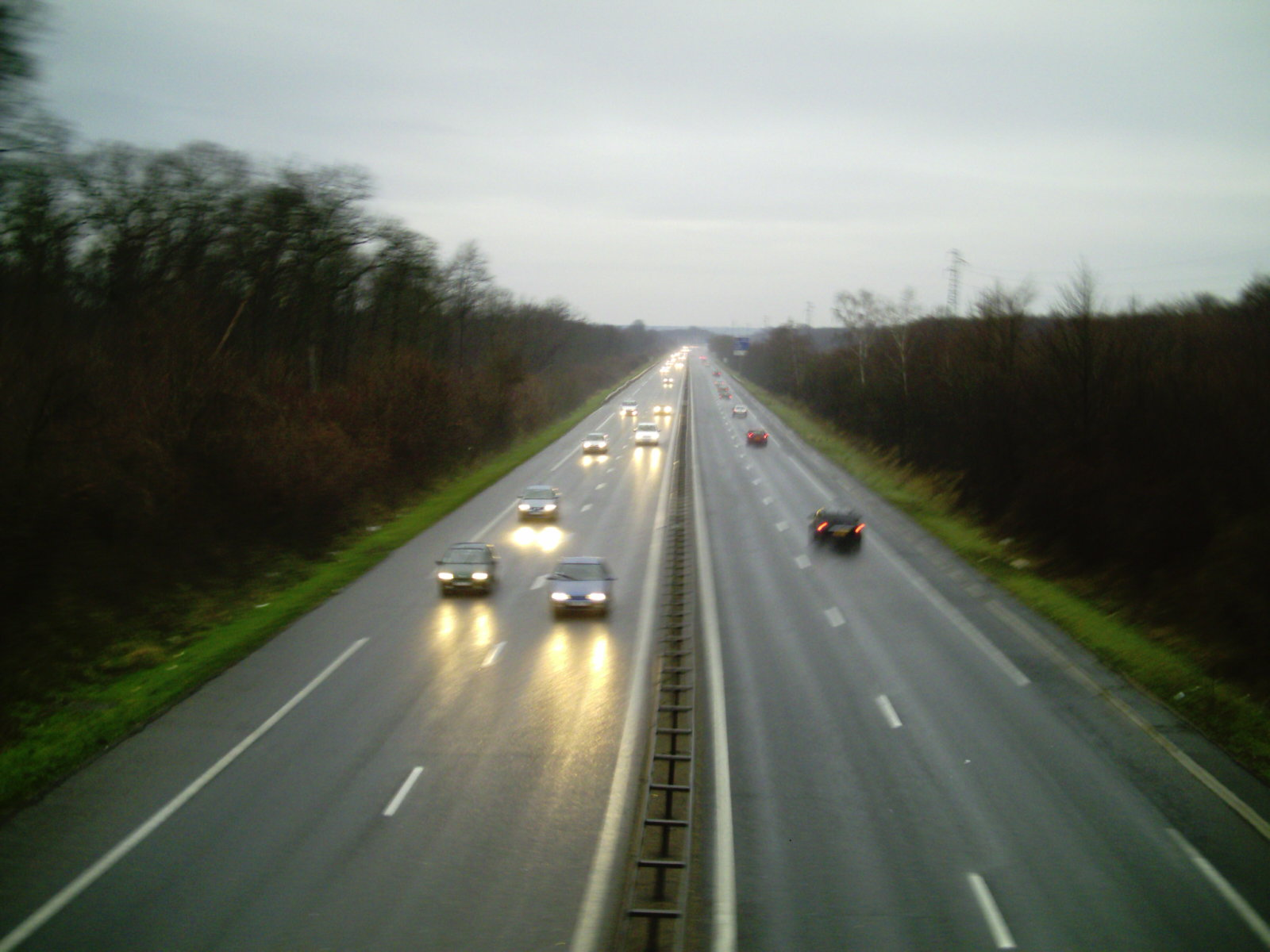
Near Laxou city

| Region | Department | km | mi | Junctions | Destinations | Notes |
|---|---|---|---|---|---|---|
| Grand Est | Meurthe-et-Moselle | 0.0 | 0.0 | A31 - A33 + 1 : Nancy - ouest | Luxembourg, Metz, Paris, Toul, Lyon, Dijon, Nancy - centre | |
| Grand Est | Meurthe-et-Moselle | 0.0 | 0.0 | A31 - A33 + 1 : Nancy - ouest | Nancy - ouest, Laxou, Grande Sapinière | |
| Grand Est | Meurthe-et-Moselle | Aire de Clairlieu; Aire de Villiers | | | | |
| Grand Est | Meurthe-et-Moselle | 6 | 3.72 | 2a / 2b : Brabois | Neuves-Maisons, Vandœuvre-lès-Nancy, Villers-lès-Nancy, Technopôle de Nancy-Brabois, Brabois | |
| Grand Est | Meurthe-et-Moselle | 10.3 | 6.40 | A330 - A33 | Nancy - sud, Heillecourt, Vandœuvre-lès-Nancy - centre, Besançon, Épinal, Ludres | |
| Grand Est | Meurthe-et-Moselle | E23 / A 33 becomes A 33 | | | | |
| Grand Est | Meurthe-et-Moselle | 13 | 8.00 | 3 : Fléville | Fléville | |
| Grand Est | Meurthe-et-Moselle | 17 | 10.5 | 4 : Saint-Nicolas-de-Port | Saint-Nicolas-de-Port, Varangéville | |
| Grand Est | Meurthe-et-Moselle | 23 | 14.3 | 5 : Rosières-aux-Salines | Blainville-sur-l'Eau, Rosières-aux-Salines | Entry and exit only from Nancy |
| Grand Est | Meurthe-et-Moselle | 25 | 15.5 | 6 : Dombasle-sur-Meurthe | Dombasle-sur-Meurthe, Z.I. des Sables | |
| Grand Est | Meurthe-et-Moselle | 27 | 26.7 | 7 : Hudiviller | Hudiviller, Dombasle-sur-Meurthe, Lunéville - Château | |
A 33 becomes N 4
1.000 mi = 1.609 km; 1.000 km = 0.621 mi

== Speeds ==
Its speed limit is:

- Lunéville-Laxou: 110 km/h from the motorway junction with the A33
- Laxou-Vandœuvre: 110 km/h
- Vandœuvre-A330: 90 km/h
- A330-Lunéville: 110 km/h

Since 1 October 2009, 3 months after the A31 and at the same time as the A33, speed limits have been revised downwards. The only 130 km/h section between the A33 and Hudiviller has been lowered to 110 km/h.

At the end of 2016, variable message signs were installed between the Vandoeuvre University Hospital area and the A31 to vary speeds depending on traffic.
