= Route nationale 5 =

The Route nationale 5, or RN 5, is a trunk road (nationale) in France now connecting Dijon with the frontier of Switzerland. It is also numbered the European route E21.

== Reclassification ==
The RN 5 originally ran to Paris following the route now numbered RN 6 to Sens. Thereafter the road has mostly been detrunked, with control and maintenance handed to local départments. A short section of road between Poligny and Les Rousses is still trunk.

== Route ==
Sens-Dijon-Dole-Geneva-Thonon-Switzerland

=== Sens to Dijon (0 km to 199 km) (as D905) ===
The road branches east from Sens as the N 60 along the Vanne valley. After 8 km the D 905 turns south east over rolling wooded countryside. The TGV line runs parallel. The road crosses the ridge of the Forêt d'Othe. The road continues through Saint-Florentin where there is a junction with the RN 77. The road then runs southeast along the valley of the Armançon, following the Canal de Bourgogne, as far as Tonnerre where it crosses to the south of both canal and river and then through Lézinnes and Ancy-le-Franc. The road continues through the Bois de la Ville eventually leaving the valley at Montbard and the nearby Abbaye de Fontenay.

The road now follows the River Brenne and leaves the Canal de Bourgogne, which it has been following for almost 100 km. The road passes the Auxois to Vitteaux and then below the Forêt de Boutas et Charmot (542 m) and then along the northern shore of the Reservoir de Grosbois and then east passing over a ridge where the road meets Sombernon and the A 38. The road now enters the valley of the River Ouche eastward through the Forêt de Plombières and enters Dijon.

=== Dijon to Geneva (Switzerland) (199 km to 386 km) ===
(as D 905 from Dijon to Poligny, RN 5 until La Cure and D 1005 until Geneva (Switzerland))

The D 905 now forms part of a ring road around the south of the city heading southeast as the Rue d'Auxonne and then the Avenue du Mont Blanc, through traffic takes the A 38. The road's old course passes through Neuilly-Crimolois (as the D 905B) before it branches south from the motorway. The road then crosses the A 31.

The road crosses open countryside past Genlis and over the A 39 skirting the Bois de Mondragon. The road crosses the River Saône at Auxonne and goes through the Bois des Crochères. Before Dole the road crosses the A 36. The D 905 bypasses the town to the west while the old road is now classed the D 405 past the Forêt de Chaux.

The road follows a wooded ridge between two river valleys. The next town is Poligny. Upon crossing the RN 83 west of Poligny, the road becomes the RN 5. The road leaves to the southeast up the Culée de Vaux into the Forêt de Poligny (575 m). The countryside is then formed by ridges which rise to become the Jura Mountains. The road heads through Champagnole overlooked bt Mont Fival (805 m). The road goes south along the Gorges de la Billaude to Saint-Laurent-en-Grandvaux.

There the road heads east over the Col de la Savine (984 m) in the Crête de la Joux Devant(1,094 m). The road drops into the next valley and the towns of Morbier and Morez. The road rises over the Crête des Sauges into Les Rousses alongside the Swiss border with a road heading over the Col de la Givrine (1228 m). Upon leaving La Cure the road becomes the D 1005.

The D 1005 heads along the Chaîne du Jura to the southwest in the Valmijoux before crossing the mountains towards Switzerland at the Col de la Faucille (1320 m). The road heading southeast passes through Gex and enters Switzerland at Ferney-Voltaire and Geneva Airport.

=== Geneva (Switzerland) to Saint-Gingolph (Switzerland) via Thonon (386 km to 436 km) (as D 1005) ===
The D 1005 commences again north-east of the city of Geneva on the southern shores of Lake Geneva. The road passes through the town of Douvaine, before reaching the shores of the lake at the village of Sciez. The road then enters the town of Thonon-les-Bains.

After Thonon the road crosses the River Dranse, and enters Amphion les Bains and then the town of Évian-les-Bains. The road now hugs the shores of the lake as the mountains climb steeply to the south with Mont Bénant. The road then passes the village of Meillerie and the town of Saint-Gingolph where the road reaches the frontier with Switzerland becoming the route 21 towards Martigny.
