= Route nationale 19 =

Road in France

National road 19
- Route nationale 19

Location
- Country: France

Highway system
- Roads in France; Autoroutes; Routes nationales

The Route nationale 19 (N19) is a trunk road (nationale) in north east France. The road forms part of European route E54.

== Reclassification ==
The RN19 has been subsequently downgraded in several sections to the RD319 and RD619.

== Route ==
Paris - Provins - Troyes - Chaumont - Langres - Vesoul - Belfort - Switzerland

=== Paris to Troyes (0 to 148 km) ===
The road starts as the Quai d'Ivry on the south bank of the river Seine south east of the City centre. The road crosses the river just downstream from the river Marne on the Pont d'Ivry. in a predominantly industrial area. The road then has a junction with the N6 (Paris to Lyon road at the Carrefour de la Résistance. The road then heads through the suburb of Maisons Alfort. After it crosses the A86 autoroute the road passes east of Créteil as the Avenue de Paris.

The road passes south east through Bonneuil-sur-Marne and the Foret de Gros Bois. The road crosses the N104 (Paris outer ring road) and enters an area famous for its cheese (Brie. The road passes through Brie Comte Robert now classified as the D319. Through traffic is now directed onto the N104 and then to Guigers where the two routes are re-united.

At Guigers the road crosses the N36 (Meaux to Melun) and then passes a refinery to Nangris. The road then turns east to the town of Provins. The road turns south east through the Foret de Sourdun (167 m) and then into the valley of the river Seine. The road next comes to Nogent-s-Seine and then heading east to Romilly-s-Seine and then south east into the city of Troyes as the Avenue du Major General Georges Vanuer.

Troyes is a major regional centre. It has excellent communications with the A5 autoroute (Paris to Langres), A26 autoroute (Calais to Troyes) as well as the N77 (Châlons to Auxerre), N60 (Troyes to Orléans) and N71 (Troyes to Dijon).

=== Troyes to Langres (148 km to 269 km) ===
The N19 heads south east out of the town past the A26 and round the bottom of the Parc Naturale Regional de la Foret d'Orient. The road drops into the Aube valley at Bar-sur-Aube. The countryside is now hilly with dense woodland with the Foret de Clairvaux to the south. The road passes Colombey-les-Deux-Églises and its monument to Charles de Gaulle.

The road then climbs over the Cote d'Alun (384 m) into the town of Chaumont in the valley of the Marne. There are junctions with the N67 (Saint Dizier to Chaumont) and the N74 (Beaune-Dijon-Langres-Chaumont-Nancy-Germany).

The road heads south east along the south bank of the Upper Marne Valley through the Bois de la Vendue and crosses the A31 autoroute and enters a small plain surrounded by hills of over 475 m. The road then enters the walled hill town of Langres.

=== Langres to Belfort/Switzerland (269 to 414 km) ===
Langres occupies an important defensive position from the east and the Franche-Comté there are views from the ramparts to the Alps. The N19 heads east past the Lac de la Liez and then climbs the surrounding hills to 409m. It then heads through wooded countryside and the Les Plains Bois and Les Grandes Bois. Before entering the town of Combeaufontaire the road crosses the Bois la Sol.

The N19 now heads through the Foret du Chanois and crosses the river Saône at Pont-s-Saône before heading south east to the town of Vesoul. Here the road crosses the N57 (Besançon–Metz-Belgium). The N19 turns north east through the Bois Franche Communes to the town of Lure.

After Lure through traffic now takes the D438 to the south while the N19 heads north past Ronchamp, the Bois de la Nannire and Foret du Cherimont into the fortress town of Belfort. Belfort is also on the A36 autoroute (Mulhouse to Dijon) and the N83 (Strasbourg–Lyon).

Originally the N19 ran from Belfort via Altkirch to the Swiss border at Basel. This section was renamed RD416 in the 1970s.

The N19 currently leaves Belfort to the south parallel to the A36. At Sevenans it turns south east over the river Bourbeuse to the town of Delle on the frontier with Switzerland. The road becomes the Swiss route 6. The link is being improved to the south of Delle with a dual carriageway to meet the Swiss autoroute A16 currently being constructed.
