= European route E512 =

Road in trans-European E-road network

E512

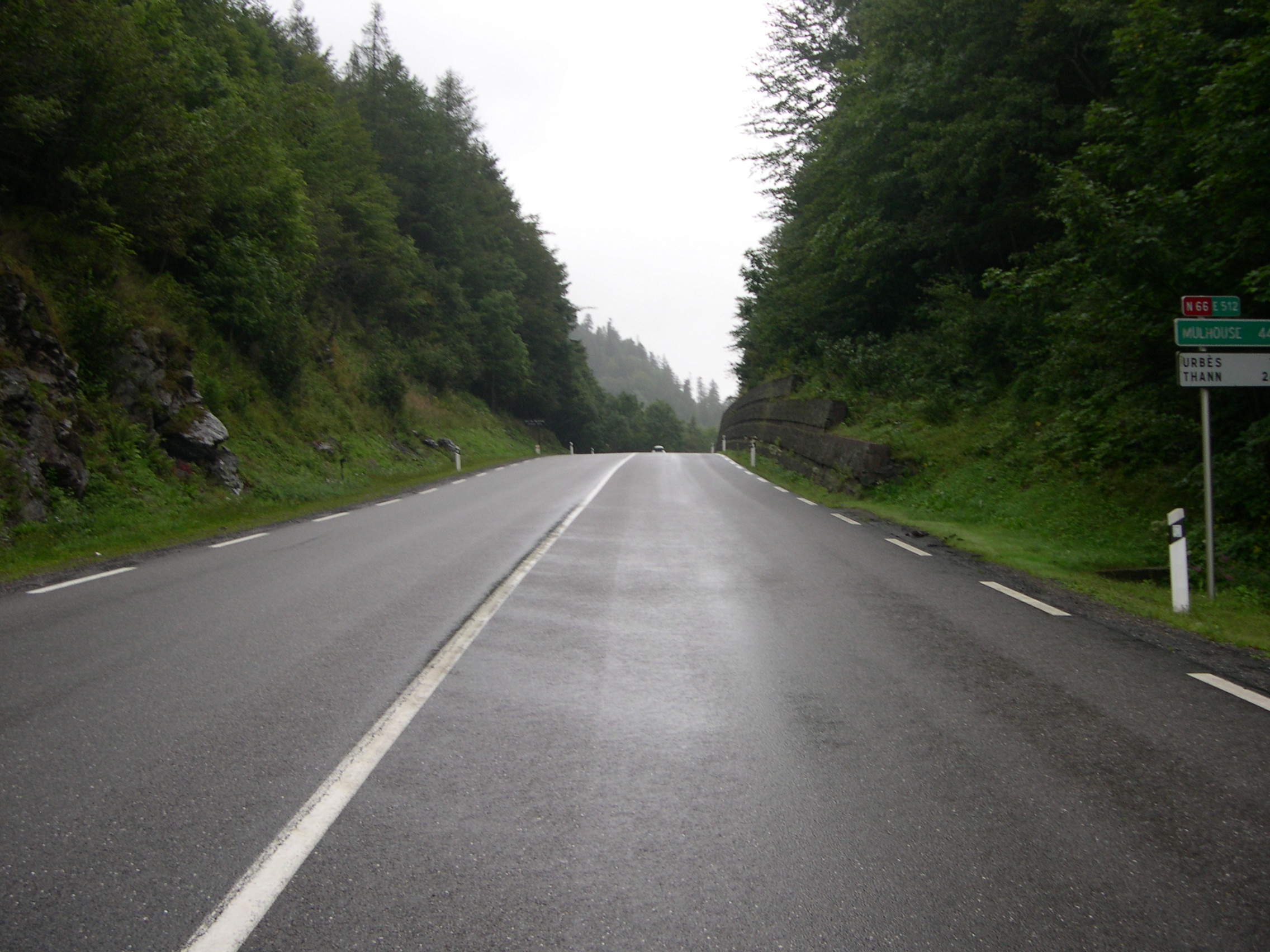
- High altitude point on E512, as it crosses the border of the Vosges and Haut-Rhin departments in the Vosges mountains

Route information
- Length: 82 km (51 mi)

Major junctions
- From: Remiremont
- Thann
- To: Mulhouse

Location
- Countries: France

Highway system
- International E-road network; A Class; B Class

E 512 is a European B class road in France, connecting the cities Remiremont, Thann, and Mulhouse.

== Route and E-road junctions ==
- France
  - Remiremont: E23
  - Thann
  - Mulhouse: E25, E54, E60
