= E23 =

E23 may refer to:

- BMW E23
- British submarine HMS E23
- European route E23
- Sprint Expressway, a major expressway in Kuala Lumpur (designated as E23 in the Malaysian Expressway System)
- Nimzo-Indian Defense, Encyclopaedia of Chess Openings code
- Higashi-Meihan Expressway and Ise Expressway, route E23 in Japan
- Citybus Route E23 in Hong Kong
