= European route E27 =

Road in trans-European E-road network

E27

Major junctions
- North end: Belfort, France
- South end: Aosta, Italy

Location
- Countries: France; Switzerland; Italy

Highway system
- International E-road network; A Class; B Class

The European route E27 is a road in Europe, part of the United Nations International E-road network, running between Belfort, France and Aosta, Italy. Between these two cities, most of the route passes through French-speaking Switzerland, including a section along the eastern shore of the Lake Geneva, and a mountain section that peaks at just above 1,900 metres in the Great St Bernard Tunnel.

Much of the route has not currently been upgraded to autoroute quality. However, major improvements in recent years have occurred in the region of the Franco-Swiss frontier and on the continuation to Delémont, with further extension of the motorway section south of Delémont ongoing. Progress is slow because of the mountainous terrain.

Apart from the Swiss capital, Bern, the towns and cities linked by the E27 tend to be medium sized or smaller. Much of route is dominated by mountainous landscapes, with a correspondingly high profile tourist trade: mountain valley agriculture or viticulture are also in evidence where the topography permits. Several sections of the E27 are more than averagely occupied by tunnels and viaducts.

E27 BELFORT-AOSTA
| State | Dep; Can; Reg | National Road Number | Section | Junction (national numbering) | Pan European road connections |
| Europe France | | | | | |
| | 90 | A36 | Belfort-Bermont | A36 12 Belfort- centre | E54 doubling E60 |
| | 90 | R.N.19 | Bermont- Delle | A36 11 Bermont | |
| - | | | | | |
| | JU | N 6 | Boncourt-Porrentruy | | |
| | JU | A16 | Porrentruy-Cornol | A 16 4 Porrentruy west A 16 5 Porrentruy east | |
| | JU | A16 | Cornol-Choindez | A 16 6 Cornol; A 16 Mont Terri; A 16 7 Saint-Ursanne; A 16; A 16 8 Glovelier; A 16 9 Bassecourt; A 16 10 Delémont west A 16 11 Delémont east | |
| | JU | A16 | Choindez-Moutier | A 16 12 Choindez; A 16 13 Moutier north | |
| | BE | N 6 | Moutier-Tavannes | | |
| | BE | A16 | Tavannes-Biel | A 16 17 Tavannes; A 16 Pierre Pertuis; A 16 18 Sonceboz; A 16 19 La Heutte; A 16 20 Péry; A 16 21 Péry; A 16 22 Frinvillier; A 16 23 Biel east | |
| | BE | N5 | through Biel / Bienne | | |
| | BE | A6 | Biel-Lyss | A 6 2 Port; A 6 3 Brügg; A 6 4 Studen; A 6 5 Lyss north A 6 6 Lyss south | |
| | BE | A6 | Lyss- Schönbühl | A 6 7 Schüpfen; A 6 8 Münchenbuchsee; A 6 9 Schönbühl | |
| | BE | A1 | Schönbühl-Bern | A 6 10 / A 1 38; A 6 11 / A 1 37 | doubling with E25 |
| | BE FR | A12 | Bern-Vevey | A 12 12 Bern-Bümpliz; A 12 11 Niederwangen; A 12 10 Flamatt; A 12 9 Düdingen; A 12 8 Fribourg north A 12 7 Fribourg south A 12 6 Matran; A 12 5 Rossens; A 12 de la Gruyère; A 12 4 Bulle; A 12 3 Vaulruz; A 12 2 Châtel-St-Denis; A 12 1 / A 9 14 | |
| | VD VS | A9 | Vevey-Martigny | A 9 14 Vevey; A 9 15 Montreux; A 9 du Chablais; A 9 16 Villeneuve; A 9 17 Aigle; A 9 18 Saint-Triphon; A 9 19 Bex; A 9 20 Saint-Maurice; A 9 du Grand-Saint-Bernard; A 9 21 Martigny-Fully; A 9 22 | doubling with E62 |
| | VS | N 21 | Martigny by-pass | | |
| | VS | N 21 | Martigny-Croix-Bourg-Saint-Bernard | | |
| - | VS | galleria | Great St Bernard Tunnel; Frontier formalities this end | | |
| Europe Italy | | | | | |
| | AO | semi-autostrada | Great St Bernard Tunnel | | |
| | AO | viabilità ordinaria | Saint-Rhémy-en-Bosses - Aosta | | E25 |
