= Route nationale 4 =

French national road

The Route nationale 4 is a trunk road (nationale) in France between Paris and the frontier with Germany.

== Reclassification ==
The RN 4 has been re-classified around Nancy as the RD 400 as through traffic is now directed onto the Autoroutes A 31 and A 33.

== Route ==
Paris-St Dizier-Nancy-Strasbourg-Germany

=== Paris to Saint Dizier (0 km to 191 km) ===
The road begins in Central Paris at the Porte Doree and a junction with the RN 6 a separate branch starts in the Bois Vincennes with a junction with the RN 34 before heading south through the park and meeting the other branch the Avenue de Gravelle. The road follows the southern edge of the park. It crosses the A4 autoroute and continues east as the Avenue des Canadiens and then crossing the river Marne. It passes through the suburbs of Joinville-le-Pont and Champigny-sur-Marne. It then passes through Chennevières-sur-Marne and an industrial area before reaching open countryside and the northern edge of the Forêt de Notre-Dame.

The road has a junction with the RN 104 and becomes a dual-carriageway and now bypasses Ozoir-la-Ferrière and then Gretz Armainvilliers south of the Forêt d'Armainvilliers. The road passes through rolling countryside past the Château de Boulayes. This is cheese county with the road taking an eastern course after Rozay-en-Brie. The road crosses the Forêt de la Traconne to Sézanne.

The road passes over open flat countryside increasingly sparsely populated reaching RN 77 and A 26. The road then drops from 200 m to 98 m at Vitry-le-François and the Marne again. There is a junction with the RD 44.

=== Saint Dizier to Nancy (191 km to 296 km) ===
The road heads south east next to the Canal de la Marne à Saône and heads into Saint-Dizier which lies on the Marne between the Forêt de la Haie Renaut and the Forêt du Val with the RN 67 branching south along the Marne valley. The RN 4 heads east up out of the valley climbing to 350 m in much steeper countryside which is also more wooded. The road then passes through the Forêt de Ligny before entering Ligny-en-Barrois itself in the Ornain valley crossing the Canal du Rhein.

The road passes to the south of the Forêt de Commercy and the village of Void-Vacon. The road is now in the valley of the river Meuse. The road passes into the town of Toul overlooked by wooded highlands including Bois de Grammont (424 m) and enters the valley of the river Moselle. The road then becomes the A 31, the old road runs parallel past the Parc de Haye in the Forêt de Haye. The road then heads east into Nancy on the river Meurthe.

=== Nancy to Strasbourg (296 km to 465 km) ===
At Nancy the road heads southeast re-classified as the D 900. Through traffic then follows the A 33 to the south. The old road passes through Saint Nicolas de Port over the river and east into Dombasle-s-Meurthe and then onward to Lunéville north of the Foret de Vitrimont. The road passes round the Forêt de Mondon and then over rolling countryside.

The road heads northeast along a ridge overlooking the Cornée de Réchicourt and Étang de Gondrexange in the Forêt de Réchicourt. The road then enters Alsace and the town of Sarrebourg. The road is doubled again as it meets the Autoroute A 4. The RN 4 passes through the Vosges over the Col de Saverne (385 m). As it heads down to Saverne it passes a Botanical Garden. After the town the road heads south east now in the valley of the Rhine. The countryside is flat and the road heads into the City of Strasbourg. The road becomes the autoroute A 351 joins the autoroute A 35 before branching east south of the city and over the river Rhine into Germany. The road then becomes the B 28.

== Village étape ==
The route is served by the following two Village étapes, Ligny-en-Barrois and Sézanne.
