= Great St Bernard Tunnel =

Road tunnel complementing the Great St Bernard Pass

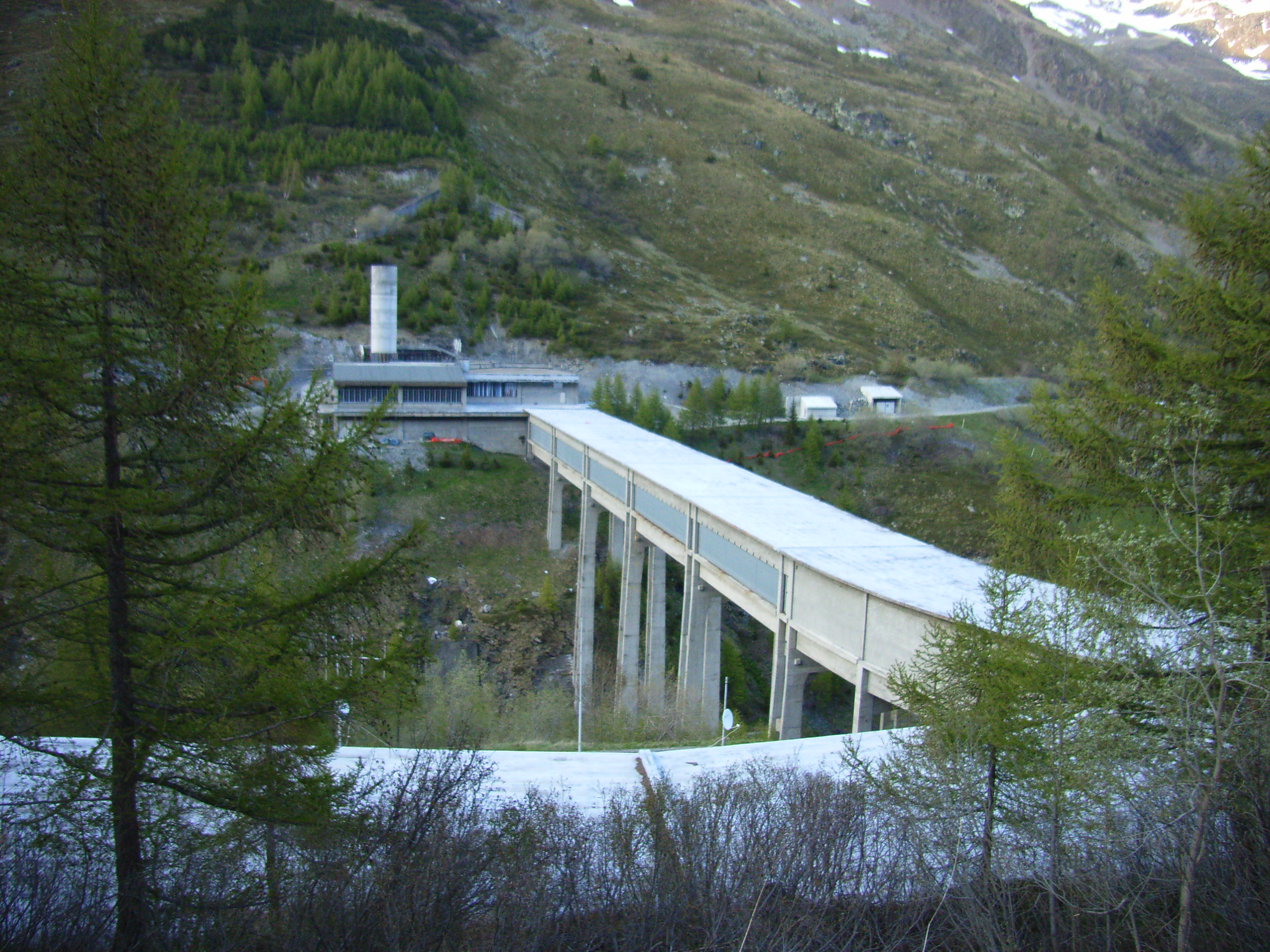
- Italian side of the tunnel
- Interactive map of Great St Bernard Tunnel

Overview
- Other names: Tunnel du Grand Saint-Bernard (French); Traforo del Gran San Bernardo (Italian); Grosser-Sankt-Bernhard-Tunnel (German)
- Location: Italy/Switzerland
- Coordinates: 45.8645°N 7.17266°E
- Status: Open
- Route: E27/ T 2/ H21
- Crosses: Great St Bernard Pass
- Start: (Italy) Saint-Rhémy-en-Bosses, Aosta Valley
- End: (Switzerland) Bourg-Saint-Pierre, Valais

Operation
- Work began: 1958
- Opened: 19 March 1964
- Operator: SISEX S.A.
- Traffic: Automotive
- Toll: See list

Technical
- Length: 5,798 m (6,341 yd)
- No. of lanes: 2 (one per direction)
- Operating speed: 80km/h (50mph)
- Max elevation: 1,918 m (6,293 ft)
- Min elevation: 1,875 m (6,152 ft)

Location of the tunnel in Aosta Valley
Location of the tunnel in Valais

The Great St Bernard Tunnel (French: Tunnel du Grand Saint-Bernard, Italian: Traforo del Gran San Bernardo, German: Grosser-Sankt-Bernhard-Tunnel) is a road tunnel complementing the Great St Bernard Pass, linking Martigny (in the Swiss canton of Valais) with Aosta (in the Aosta Valley, in north western Italy).

== Description ==
There is a toll to use the tunnel, payable in full even for drivers who already display on their vehicles a Swiss motorway vignette. The tunnel comprises a section of the E27 route linking Belfort with Aosta.

For most of its 5,798-metre (6,341 yd) length the tunnel runs in a straight line, but incorporates a gentle slope. The northern end is 1,918 m (6,293 ft) above sea level while the southern end is only 1,875 m (6,152 ft) above sea level. At both ends, the approach road to the tunnel is covered by a gallery/avalanche shelter in order to minimize the risk of access to the tunnel being temporarily blocked during bad weather. Any frontier formalities are handled at the tunnel's north end, although the actual national frontier is around 4,100 m (4,500 yd) from the Swiss tunnel entrance and 1,700 m (1,900 yd) from the Italian entrance. Note that the Swiss manage 2,938 m (3,213 yd) of the tunnel, while Italians 2,860 m (3,130 yd), so the border between the two operating entities does not lie at the state border, but around one kilometre on the Swiss side.

The name of the tunnel comes directly from that of the Grand St Bernard Pass, and thereby indirectly from the saint who in AD 1049 founded the hospice high above the tunnel, which also bears his name. Tourists on the Swiss side additionally find themselves reminded by roadside billboards of the saint's association with St Bernard dogs.

The Rhône Pipeline has carried oil through the tunnel since 1966.

=== Toll charges ===
As of 1 August 2020

Vehicle class	One way	Return (Note: Within 30 days)	10 crossings (Note: Two years validity)	20 crossings (Note: Two years validity)
A1 (Note: Motorcycle, motorcycle with sidecar, motorcycle with trailer)	€16.50; CHF 17.50	€22.10; CHF 23.50	€112; CHF 118.50	€150; CHF 159
A2 (Note: Vehicles with 2 or more axles, height measured from the front axle of less than 1.3m and total height not exceeding 2m)	€27.80; CHF 29.50	€44.60; CHF 47.30	€112; CHF 118.50	€150; CHF 159
B1 (Note: Vehicles with 2 or more axles, total height exceeding 2m and equal to/less than 3m)	€43.40; CHF 46	€69.30; CHF 73.50	€260.50; CHF 276	€346; CHF 367
B2 (Note: 2-axle goods vehicle with total height exceeding 3m)	€75.50; CHF 80	€122; CHF 129.50	€563; CHF 597	€981; CHF 1,040
B3 (Note: 2-axle passenger vehicle with a total height exceeding 3m)	€75.50; CHF 80	€122; CHF 129.50	€563; CHF 597	€981; CHF 1,040
3A (Note: 3-axle goods vehicle with total height exceeding 3m)	€110; CHF 116.50	€176; CHF 186.50	€825; CHF 874	€1,424; CHF 1,510
3B (Note: 3-axle passenger vehicle with a total height exceeding 3m)	€110; CHF 116.50	€176; CHF 186.50	€825; CHF 874	€1,424; CHF 1,510
4 (Note: Vehicles with 4 or more axles and total height exceeding 3m)	€167; CHF 177	€266; CHF 282	€1,257; CHF 1,333	€2,153; CHF 2,282

== History ==
Before the tunnel was constructed, the frontier was passable here only using the Great St Bernard Pass, which took its name from the Great St Bernard Hospice, a monastery, and ultimately from the monastery's founder Bernard of Menthon.

The pass remains an option in summer, but is normally closed by snow between October and May, and sometimes for longer. The tunnel, on the other hand, is intended to be usable uninterruptedly for 365 days throughout the year.

Construction of the tunnel began in 1958 and it was opened to traffic on 19 March 1964, when it was the longest road tunnel in the world, surpassing the Vielha tunnel in the Pyrenees in Spain which was opened in 1948.

The approach roads have been progressively improved, and most recently the avalanche covers have been extended on the southern side. The Mont Blanc tunnel tragedy of 1999 prompted a major review of road tunnel safety in several countries including Switzerland, and significant safety upgrades are planned for the Grand St Bernard Tunnel. A speed limit of 80 km/h (50 mph) is already in force inside the tunnel.

== Access and popularity ==
The tunnel and most of the connecting roads between Aosta and Martigny are only single-carriageway roads, and for most relevant city destinations in Switzerland and Italy the toll-free St Gotthard Tunnel and Simplon Pass offer more direct or at least faster routes. This and the toll ensure that the Grand San Bernard Tunnel rarely suffers from the levels of holiday season congestion that plague the more popular Alpine crossing routes.

== Notes ==
Records
Preceded by Alfonso XIII (Vielha) Tunnel; 5.24 km (3.26 mi)	World's longest road tunnel 1964–1965	Succeeded by Mont Blanc Tunnel; 11.61 km (7.22 mi)
