= Le Petit-Mercey =

- Part of Dampierre
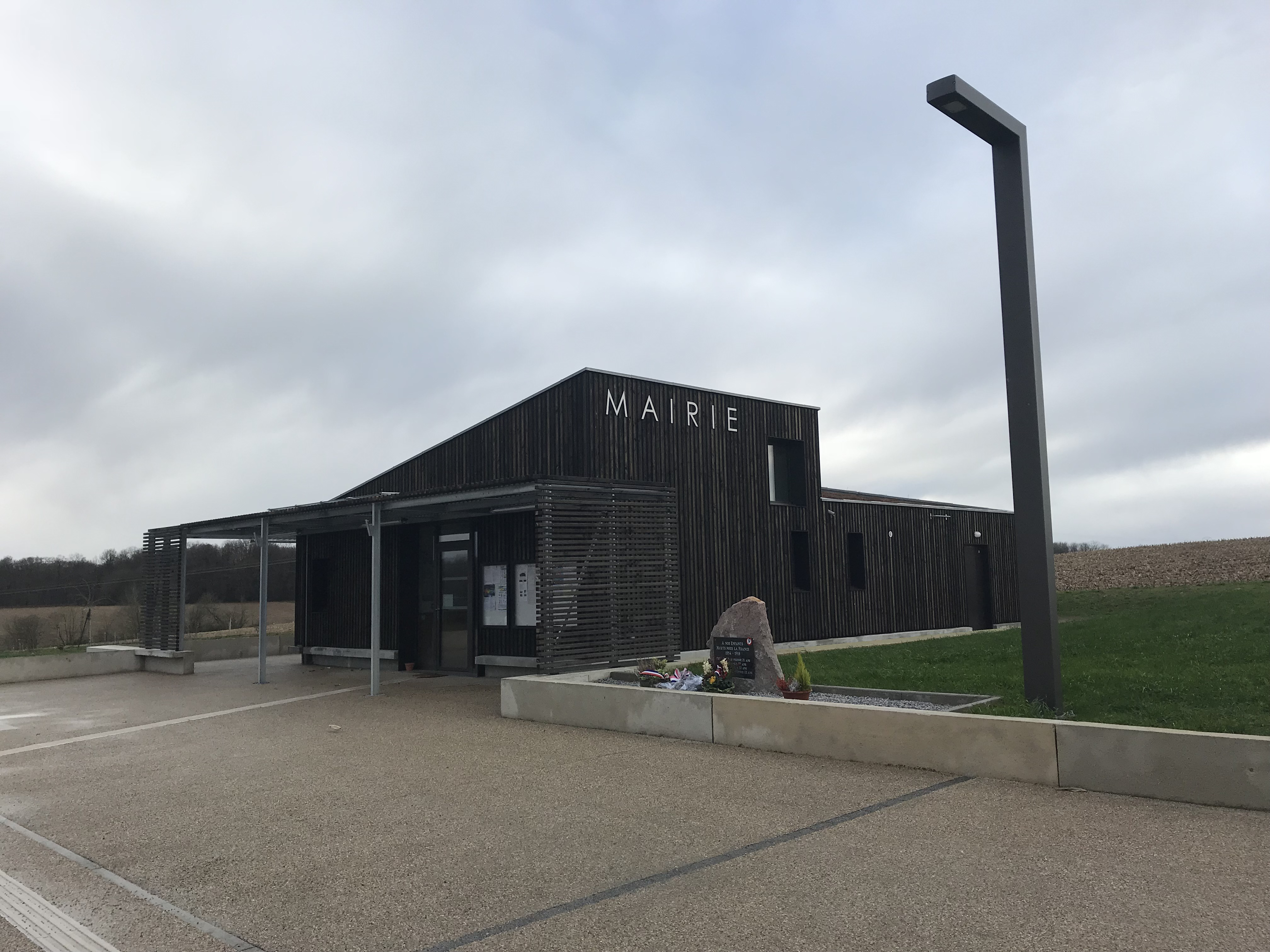
- Town hall
- Location of Le Petit-Mercey
- Location within France Location within Bourgogne-Franche-Comté
- Coordinates: 47°11′37″N 5°44′42″E
- Country: France
- Region: Bourgogne-Franche-Comté
- Department: Jura
- Arrondissement: Dole
- Canton: Authume
- Commune: Dampierre
- Area^{1}: 2.49 km^{2} (0.96 sq mi)
- Highest elevation: 278 m (912 ft)
- Lowest elevation: 240 m (790 ft)
- Population (2023): 129
  - Density: 51.8/km^{2} (134/sq mi)
- Time zone: UTC+01:00 (CET)
  - Summer (DST): UTC+02:00 (CEST)
- Postal code: 39350
- ^{1} French Land Register data, which excludes lakes, ponds, glaciers > 1 km^{2} (0.386 sq mi or 247 acres) and river estuaries.

Le Petit-Mercey (French pronunciation: [lə pəti mɛʁsɛ]) is a former commune in the Jura department in Bourgogne-Franche-Comté in eastern France. On 1 January 2019, it was merged into the commune Dampierre.

== See also ==
- Communes of the Jura department
