= Ennery, Moselle =

Ennery
- Commune
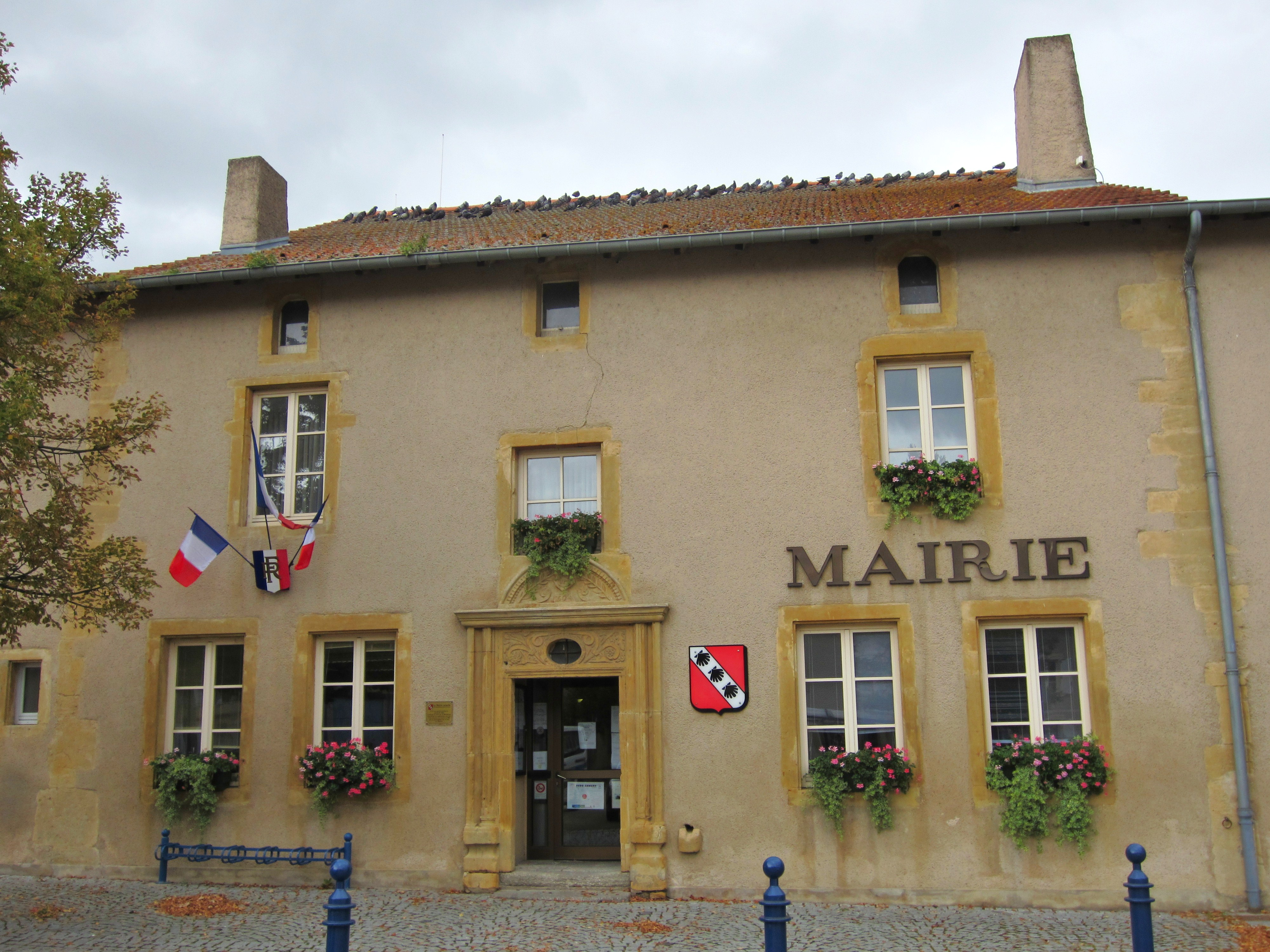
- The town hall in Ennery

- Coat of arms
- Location of Ennery
- Location within France Location within Grand Est
- Coordinates: 49°13′36″N 6°13′03″E
- Country: France
- Region: Grand Est
- Department: Moselle
- Arrondissement: Metz
- Canton: Le Pays Messin
- Intercommunality: CC Rives de Moselle

Government
  - Mayor (2020–2026): Ghislaine Melon
- Area^{1}: 7.24 km^{2} (2.80 sq mi)
- Elevation: 185 m (607 ft)
- Highest elevation: 228 m (748 ft)
- Lowest elevation: 154 m (505 ft)
- Population (2023): 2,322
  - Density: 321/km^{2} (831/sq mi)
- Time zone: UTC+01:00 (CET)
  - Summer (DST): UTC+02:00 (CEST)
- INSEE/Postal code: 57193 /57365
- ^{1} French Land Register data, which excludes lakes, ponds, glaciers > 1 km^{2} (0.386 sq mi or 247 acres) and river estuaries.

Ennery (French pronunciation: [ɛnʁi]; German: Ennerchen) is a commune in the Moselle department in Grand Est in north-eastern France.

== Population ==
Historical population
Year	Pop.	±% p.a.
1968	637	—
1975	1,325	+11.03%
1982	1,656	+3.24%
1990	1,743	+0.64%
1999	1,758	+0.10%
2007	1,644	−0.83%
2012	1,921	+3.16%
2017	2,010	+0.91%
2023	2,322	+2.43%
Source: INSEE

== See also ==
- Communes of the Moselle department
