= Dampierre, Jura =

Commune in Bourgogne-Franche-Comté, France

Dampierre
- Commune
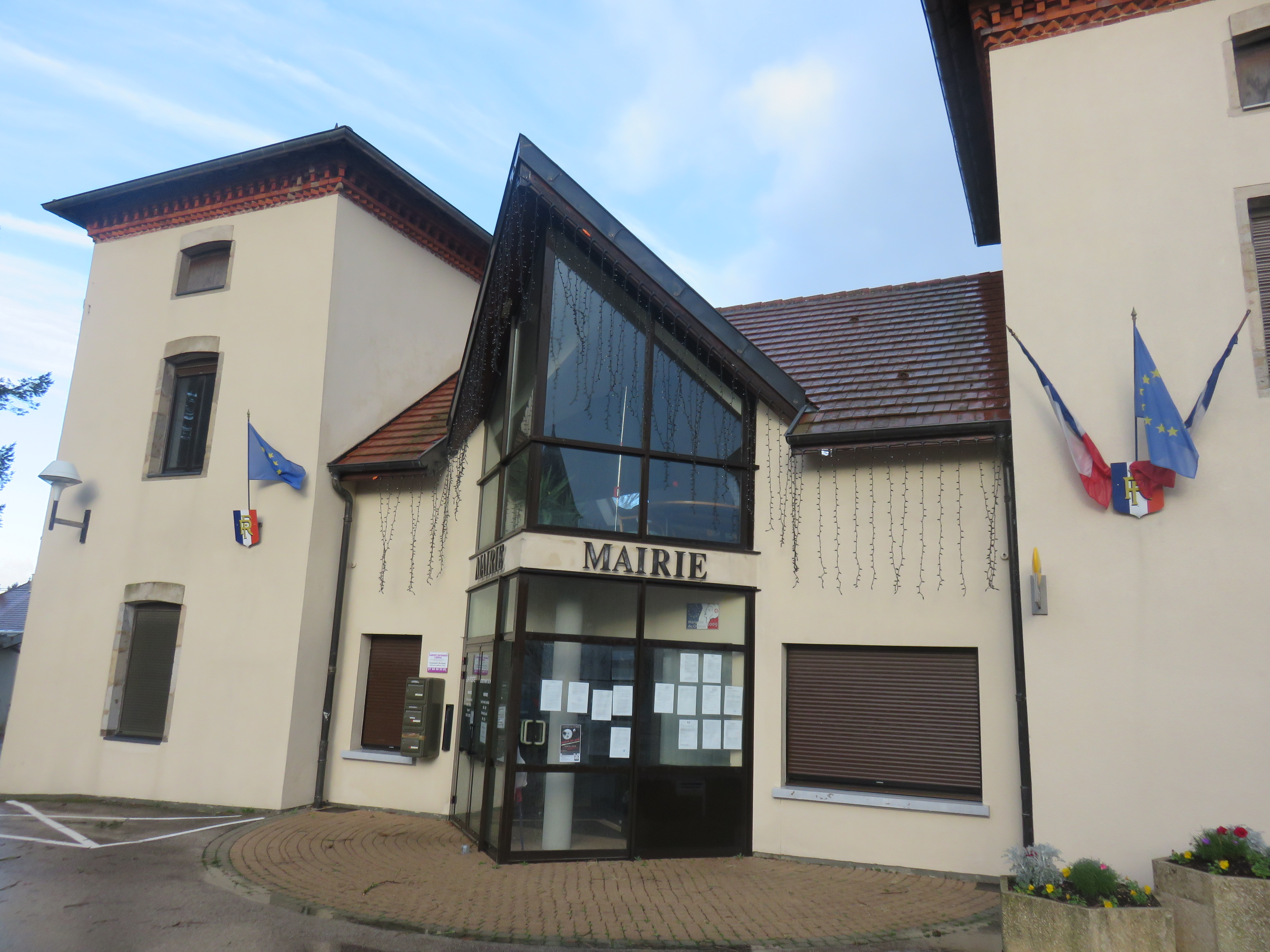
- The town hall in Dampierre

- Coat of arms
- Location of Dampierre
- Location within France Location within Bourgogne-Franche-Comté
- Coordinates: 47°09′21″N 5°44′36″E
- Country: France
- Region: Bourgogne-Franche-Comté
- Department: Jura
- Arrondissement: Dole
- Canton: Mont-sous-Vaudrey

Government
  - Mayor (2020–2026): Laure Valentin
- Area^{1}: 9.48 km^{2} (3.66 sq mi)
- Highest elevation: 278 m (912 ft)
- Lowest elevation: 210 m (690 ft)
- Population (2023): 1,314
  - Density: 139/km^{2} (359/sq mi)
- Time zone: UTC+01:00 (CET)
  - Summer (DST): UTC+02:00 (CEST)
- INSEE/Postal code: 39190 /39700
- ^{1} French Land Register data, which excludes lakes, ponds, glaciers > 1 km^{2} (0.386 sq mi or 247 acres) and river estuaries.

Dampierre (French pronunciation: [dɑ̃pjɛʁ]) is a commune in the Jura department in Bourgogne-Franche-Comté in eastern France. On 1 January 2019, the former commune Le Petit-Mercey was merged into Dampierre.

== Population ==
Historical population
Year	Pop.	±% p.a.
1968	622	—
1975	709	+1.89%
1982	867	+2.92%
1990	994	+1.72%
1999	1,057	+0.69%
2007	1,289	+2.51%
2012	1,294	+0.08%
2017	1,278	−0.25%
2023	1,314	+0.46%
Source: INSEE

Population data refer to the area corresponding with the commune as of January 2025.

== See also ==
- Communes of the Jura department
