= Hudiviller =

- Commune
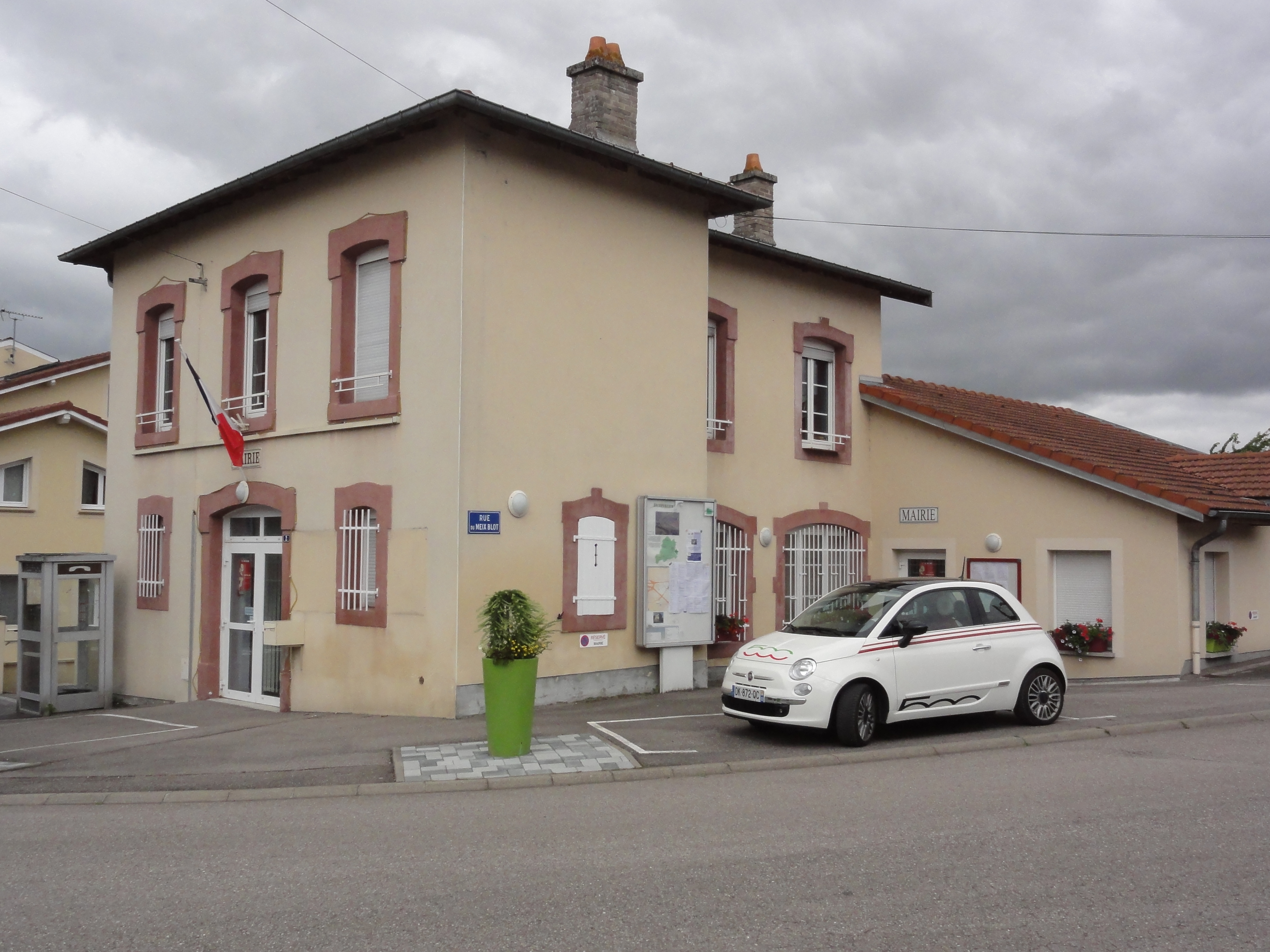
- The town hall in Hudiviller

- Coat of arms
- Location of Hudiviller
- Location within France Location within Grand Est
- Coordinates: 48°36′11″N 6°23′47″E
- Country: France
- Region: Grand Est
- Department: Meurthe-et-Moselle
- Arrondissement: Nancy
- Canton: Lunéville-1
- Intercommunality: CC des Pays du Sel et du Vermois

Government
  - Mayor (2023–2026): Patrick Oster
- Area^{1}: 2.99 km^{2} (1.15 sq mi)
- Elevation: 250 m (820 ft)
- Highest elevation: 307 m (1,007 ft)
- Lowest elevation: 230 m (750 ft)
- Population (2023): 313
  - Density: 105/km^{2} (271/sq mi)
- Time zone: UTC+01:00 (CET)
  - Summer (DST): UTC+02:00 (CEST)
- INSEE/Postal code: 54269 /54110
- ^{1} French Land Register data, which excludes lakes, ponds, glaciers > 1 km^{2} (0.386 sq mi or 247 acres) and river estuaries.

Hudiviller (French pronunciation: [ydivile]) is a commune in the Meurthe-et-Moselle department in north-eastern France.

== See also ==
- Communes of the Meurthe-et-Moselle department
