= Choisey =

Commune in Bourgogne-Franche-Comté, France

- Commune
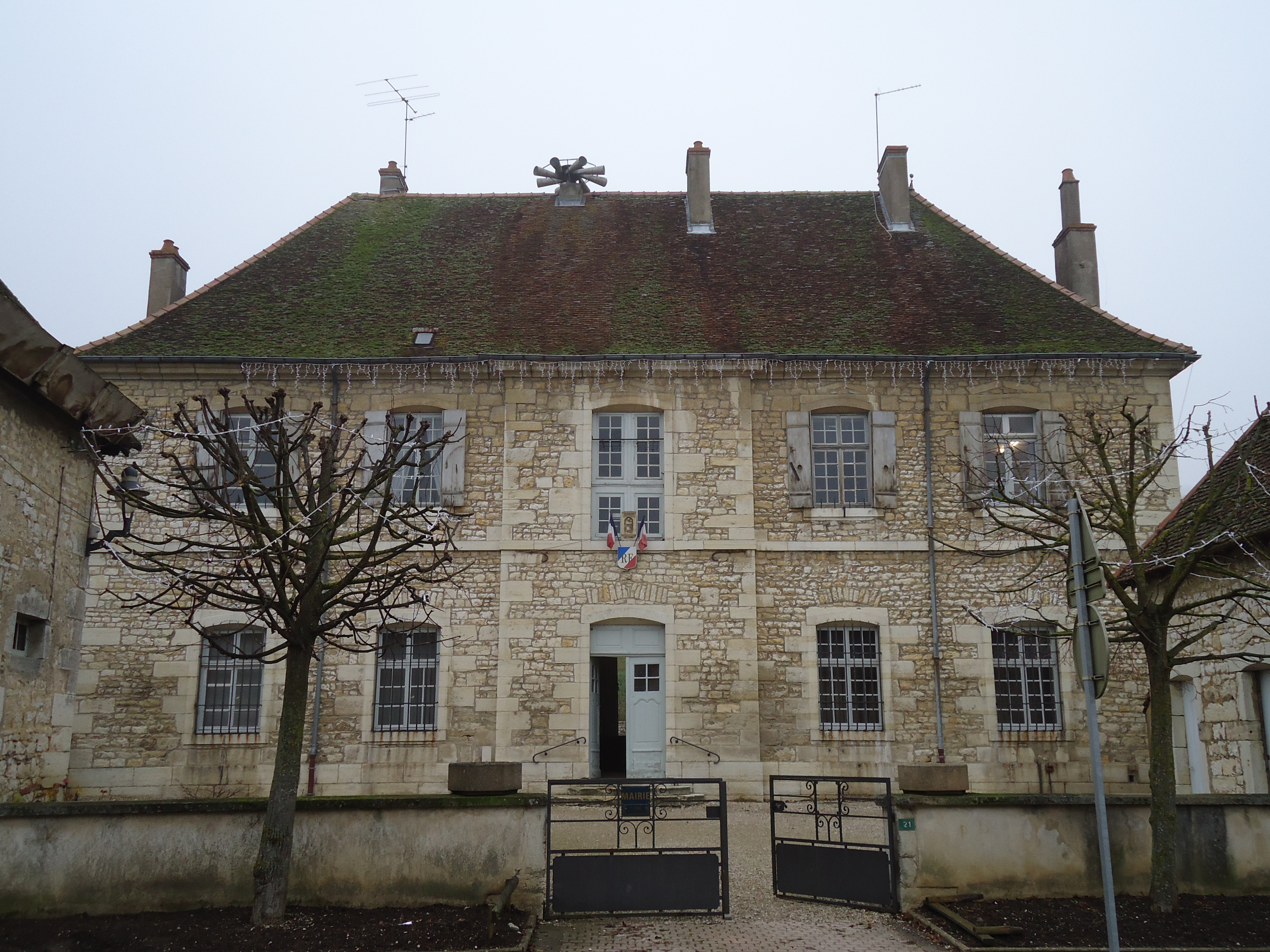
- Town hall

- Coat of arms
- Location of Choisey
- Location within France Location within Bourgogne-Franche-Comté
- Coordinates: 47°03′47″N 5°27′37″E
- Country: France
- Region: Bourgogne-Franche-Comté
- Department: Jura
- Arrondissement: Dole
- Canton: Dole-2
- Intercommunality: CA Grand Dole

Government
  - Mayor (2021–2026): Hélène Thevenin
- Area^{1}: 7.64 km^{2} (2.95 sq mi)
- Highest elevation: 231 m (758 ft)
- Lowest elevation: 193 m (633 ft)
- Population (2023): 1,021
  - Density: 134/km^{2} (346/sq mi)
- Time zone: UTC+01:00 (CET)
  - Summer (DST): UTC+02:00 (CEST)
- INSEE/Postal code: 39150 /39100
- ^{1} French Land Register data, which excludes lakes, ponds, glaciers > 1 km^{2} (0.386 sq mi or 247 acres) and river estuaries.

Choisey (French pronunciation: [ʃwazɛ]) is a commune in the Jura department in Bourgogne-Franche-Comté in eastern France.

== Population ==
Historical population
Year	Pop.	±% p.a.
1968	747	—
1975	764	+0.32%
1982	877	+1.99%
1990	887	+0.14%
1999	984	+1.16%
2007	1,019	+0.44%
2012	1,063	+0.85%
2017	1,050	−0.25%
2023	1,021	−0.47%
Source: INSEE

== See also ==
- Communes of the Jura department
