= European route E23 =

Road in trans-European E-road network

E23

Major junctions
- North end: Metz, France
- South end: Lausanne, Switzerland

Location
- Countries: France; Switzerland

Highway system
- International E-road network; A Class; B Class

European route E23 is a series of roads in Europe, part of the United Nations International E-road network.

== Links with other European routes ==
- At Metz, it links with the E21, the E25, the E50, and the E411.
- It links with the E21 at Nancy.
- Further along at Remiremont it joins with the E512.
- At Vesoul it connects to the E54.
- Just before the Swiss border at Besançon, it makes a connection to the E60.
- At its final destination of Lausanne it connects with the E25 and the E62.
