= Saint-Jean-de-Losne =

- Commune
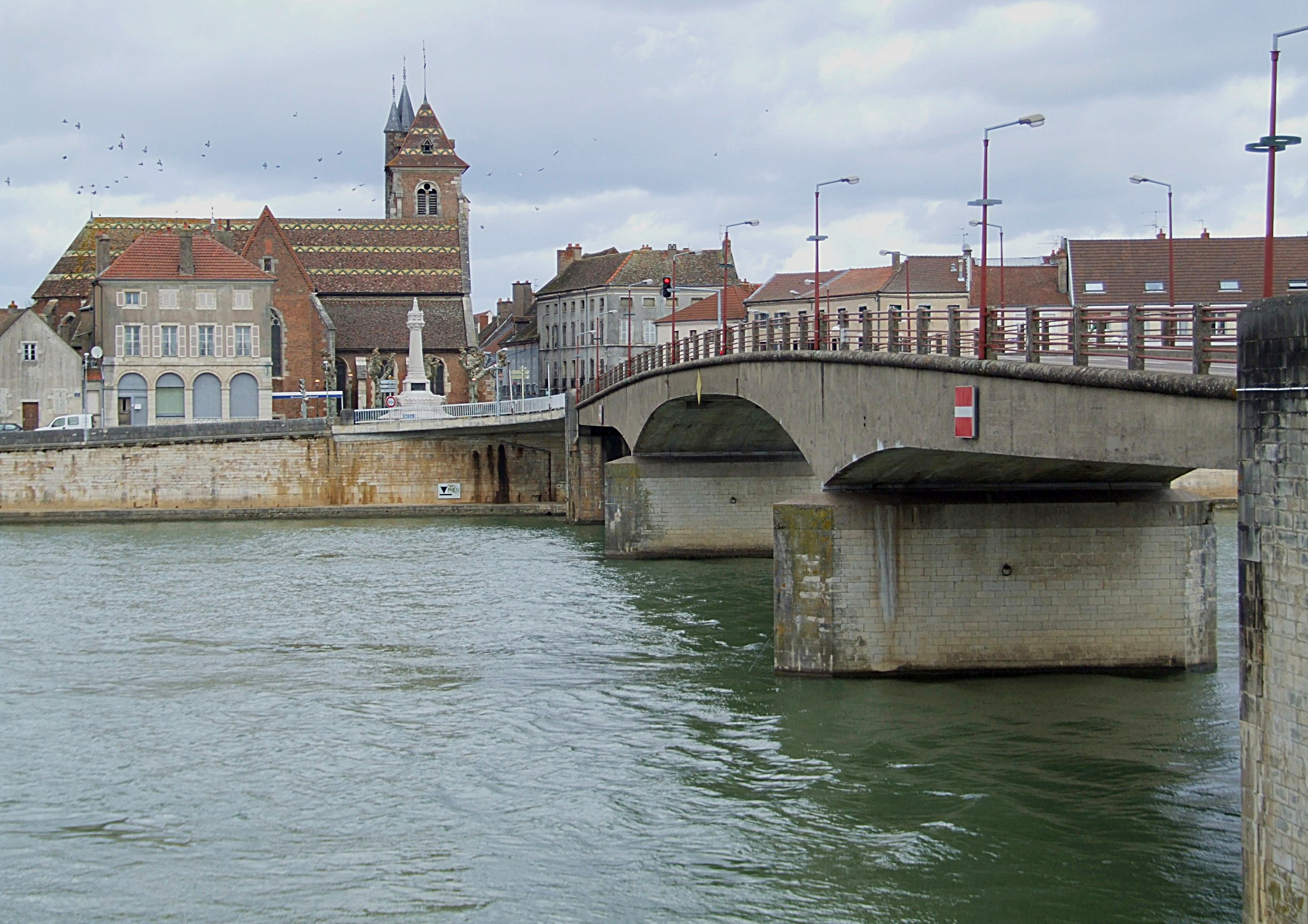
- Bridge over the Saône River

- Coat of arms
- Location of Saint-Jean-de-Losne
- Location within France Location within Bourgogne-Franche-Comté
- Coordinates: 47°06′14″N 5°15′53″E
- Country: France
- Region: Bourgogne-Franche-Comté
- Department: Côte-d'Or
- Arrondissement: Beaune
- Canton: Brazey-en-Plaine
- Intercommunality: Rives de Saône

Government
  - Mayor (2020–2026): Marie-Line Duparc
- Area^{1}: 0.5 km^{2} (0.19 sq mi)
- Elevation: 184 m (604 ft)
- Highest elevation: 182 m (597 ft)
- Lowest elevation: 179 m (587 ft)
- Population (2023): 990
  - Density: 2,000/km^{2} (5,100/sq mi)
- Time zone: UTC+01:00 (CET)
  - Summer (DST): UTC+02:00 (CEST)
- INSEE/Postal code: 21554 /21170
- ^{1} French Land Register data, which excludes lakes, ponds, glaciers > 1 km^{2} (0.386 sq mi or 247 acres) and river estuaries.

Saint-Jean-de-Losne (French pronunciation: [sɛ̃ ʒɑ̃ də lon], literally Saint John of Losne) is a commune in the Côte-d'Or department in eastern France. It is about 25 km (16 mi) southeast of Dijon.

== History ==
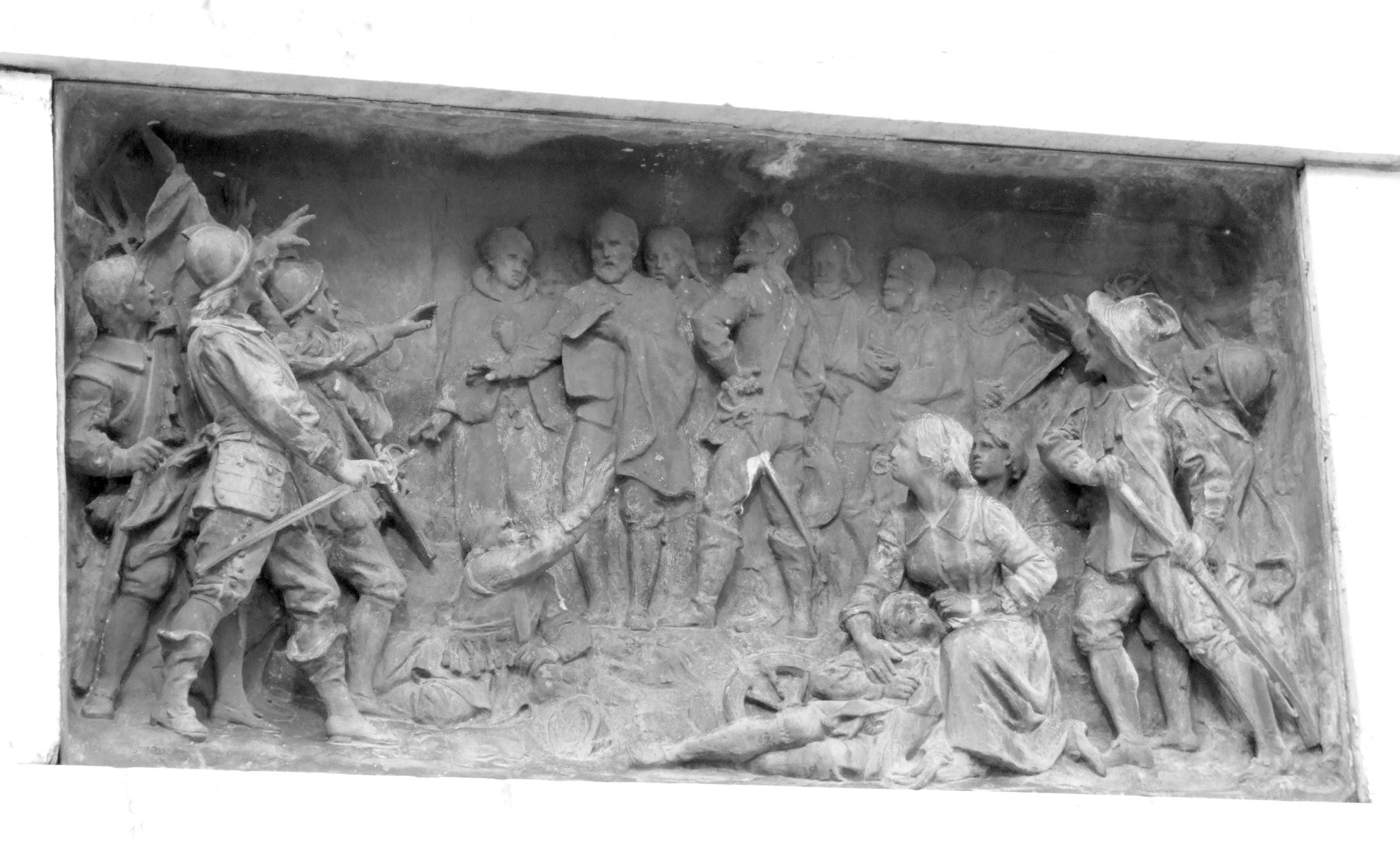
Monument commemorating the 1636 siege, by Mathurin Moreau

Despite its size, the town's position on the Saône River meant it featured in a number of battles. In October 1636, during the Thirty Years War, the fortress was besieged by an Imperial army; the garrison commander, Mothe-Houdancourt, held out long enough to be relieved.

During the closing stages of the Napoleonic Wars in January 1814, the local inhabitants repelled several attempts by the Austrians to seize the bridge. In recognition, Napoleon awarded the town the Legion of Honour, which still appears on the coat of arms.

== Population ==
Historical population
Year	Pop.	±% p.a.
1968	1,623	—
1975	1,605	−0.16%
1982	1,476	−1.19%
1990	1,342	−1.18%
1999	1,257	−0.72%
2007	1,204	−0.54%
2012	1,168	−0.61%
2017	1,092	−1.34%
2023	990	−1.62%
Source: INSEE

== See also ==
- Canal de Bourgogne
- Communes of the Côte-d'Or department

== Sources ==
- Jacques, Tony (2007). Dictionary of Battles and Sieges: P-Z. Greenwood. ISBN 978-0313335396.
