= Fauverney =

- Commune
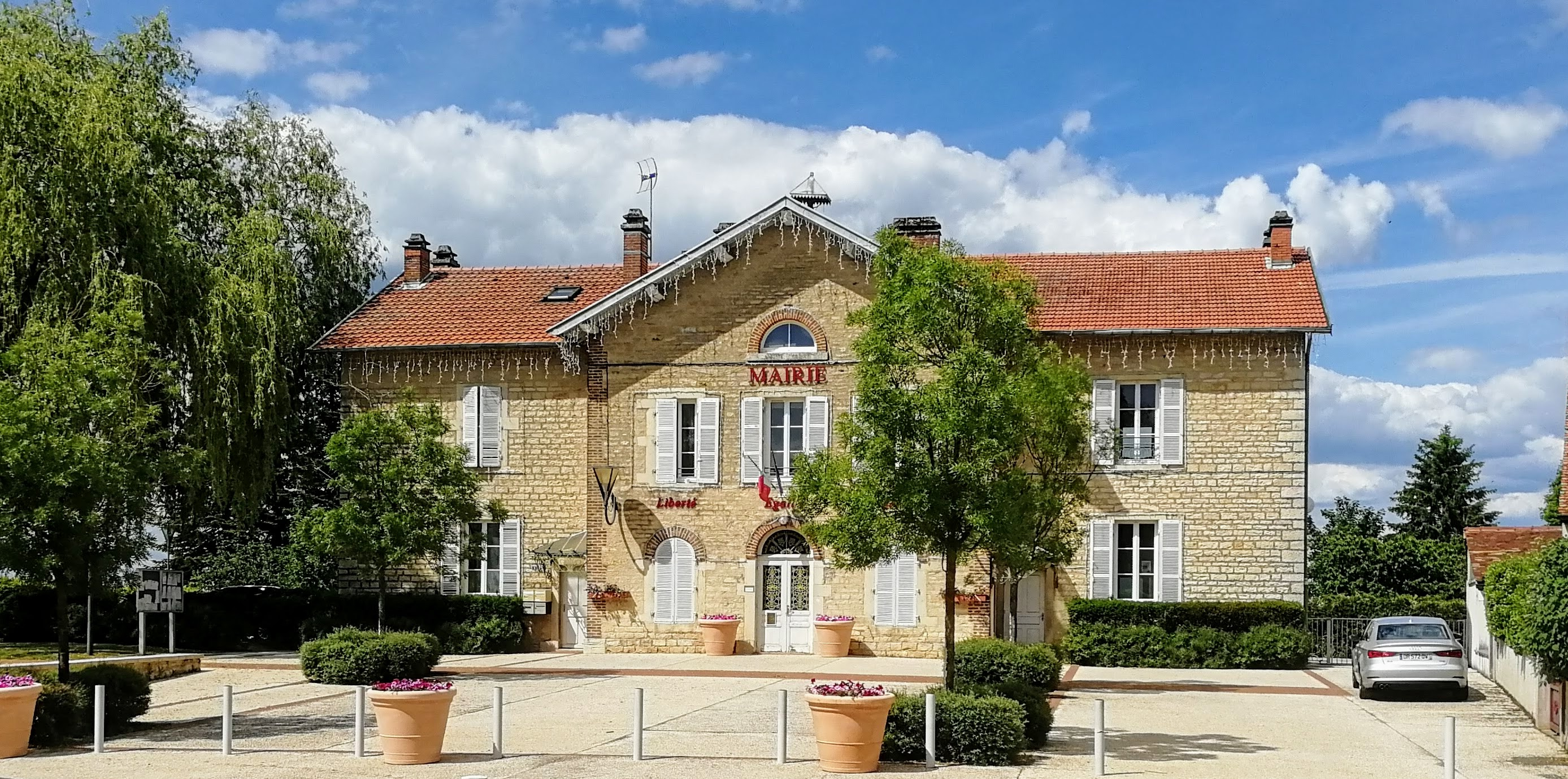
- Town hall

- Coat of arms
- Location of Fauverney
- Location within France Location within Bourgogne-Franche-Comté
- Coordinates: 47°15′21″N 5°08′43″E
- Country: France
- Region: Bourgogne-Franche-Comté
- Department: Côte-d'Or
- Arrondissement: Dijon
- Canton: Genlis
- Intercommunality: Plaine Dijonnaise

Government
  - Mayor (2020–2026): François Bigeard
- Area^{1}: 8.68 km^{2} (3.35 sq mi)
- Highest elevation: 231 m (758 ft)
- Lowest elevation: 203 m (666 ft)
- Population (2023): 651
  - Density: 75.0/km^{2} (194/sq mi)
- Time zone: UTC+01:00 (CET)
  - Summer (DST): UTC+02:00 (CEST)
- INSEE/Postal code: 21261 /21110
- ^{1} French Land Register data, which excludes lakes, ponds, glaciers > 1 km^{2} (0.386 sq mi or 247 acres) and river estuaries.

Fauverney (French pronunciation: [fovɛʁnɛ]) is a commune in the Côte-d'Or department in eastern France.

== Population ==
Historical population
Year	Pop.	±% p.a.
1968	455	—
1975	492	+1.12%
1982	539	+1.31%
1990	580	+0.92%
1999	645	+1.19%
2007	698	+0.99%
2012	686	−0.35%
2017	625	−1.85%
2023	651	+0.68%
Source: INSEE

== See also ==
- Communes of the Côte-d'Or department
