= Authume =

Commune in Bourgogne-Franche-Comté, France

- Commune
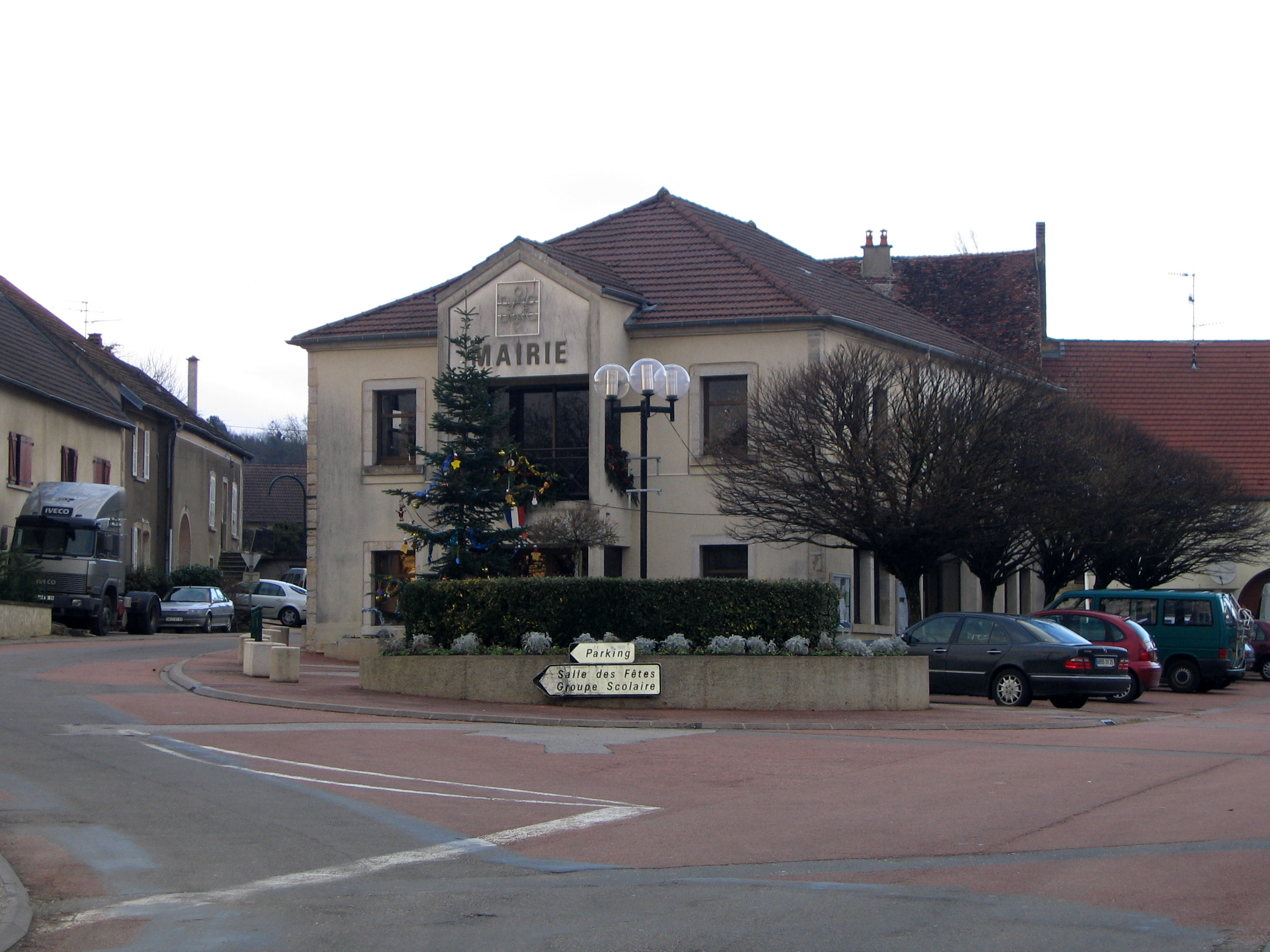
- The town hall in Authume
- Location of Authume
- Location within France Location within Bourgogne-Franche-Comté
- Coordinates: 47°07′36″N 5°30′11″E
- Country: France
- Region: Bourgogne-Franche-Comté
- Department: Jura
- Arrondissement: Dole
- Canton: Authume
- Intercommunality: CA Grand Dole

Government
  - Mayor (2020–2026): Grégory Soldavini
- Area^{1}: 7.52 km^{2} (2.90 sq mi)
- Highest elevation: 337 m (1,106 ft)
- Lowest elevation: 223 m (732 ft)
- Population (2023): 906
  - Density: 120/km^{2} (312/sq mi)
- Time zone: UTC+01:00 (CET)
  - Summer (DST): UTC+02:00 (CEST)
- INSEE/Postal code: 39030 /39100
- ^{1} French Land Register data, which excludes lakes, ponds, glaciers > 1 km^{2} (0.386 sq mi or 247 acres) and river estuaries.

Authume (French pronunciation: [otym]) is a commune in the Jura department in the region of Bourgogne-Franche-Comté in eastern France.

== Population ==
Historical population
Year	Pop.	±% p.a.
1968	512	—
1975	576	+1.70%
1982	760	+4.04%
1990	820	+0.95%
1999	776	−0.61%
2007	788	+0.19%
2012	810	+0.55%
2017	821	+0.27%
2023	906	+1.66%
Source: INSEE

== See also ==
- Communes of the Jura department
