= European route E54 =

Road in trans-European E-road network

E54

Major junctions
- West end: Paris, France
- East end: Münich, Germany

Location
- Countries: France; Germany; Switzerland

Highway system
- International E-road network; A Class; B Class

European route E 54 is a road that is part of the International E-road network. It runs from Paris, France to Münich, Germany.

== Route ==
- France
  - Paris → Sens → Troyes (A5) — same route as E60
  - Troyes → Langres (A5) — same route as E17
  - Langres → Vesoul → Lure → Belfort (N19)
  - Belfort → Mulhouse (A36)
- Germany (following the Rhine and the German/Swiss border)
  - Lörrach → Rheinfelden → Bad Säckingen → Albbruck → Waldshut-Tiengen → Klettgau (partly (A98))
- Switzerland
  - Schaffhausen
- Germany
  - Singen → Überlingen → Friedrichshafen → Lindau (partly A98)
  - Lindau → Memmingen → Landsberg am Lech → Münich (A96)
