= European route E21 =

Road in trans-European E-road network

E21

Route information
- Length: 458 km (285 mi)

Major junctions
- North end: Metz, France
- South end: Geneva, Switzerland

Location
- Countries: France; Switzerland

Highway system
- International E-road network; A Class; B Class

European route E21 is a series of roads in Europe, part of the United Nations International E-road network.

It runs between Metz, France and Geneva, Switzerland. It meets the European route E25, the E50 and the E411 at Metz, from where it departs. On its way to Geneva, it crosses the E23 at Nancy, and also passes through Dijon. It enters Switzerland soon after and links with the E25, the E62 and the E712 at Geneva, allowing further travel through Europe. It is 458 km (285 mi) long in total.
