= Bellignat =

Commune in Auvergne-Rhône-Alpes, France

- Commune
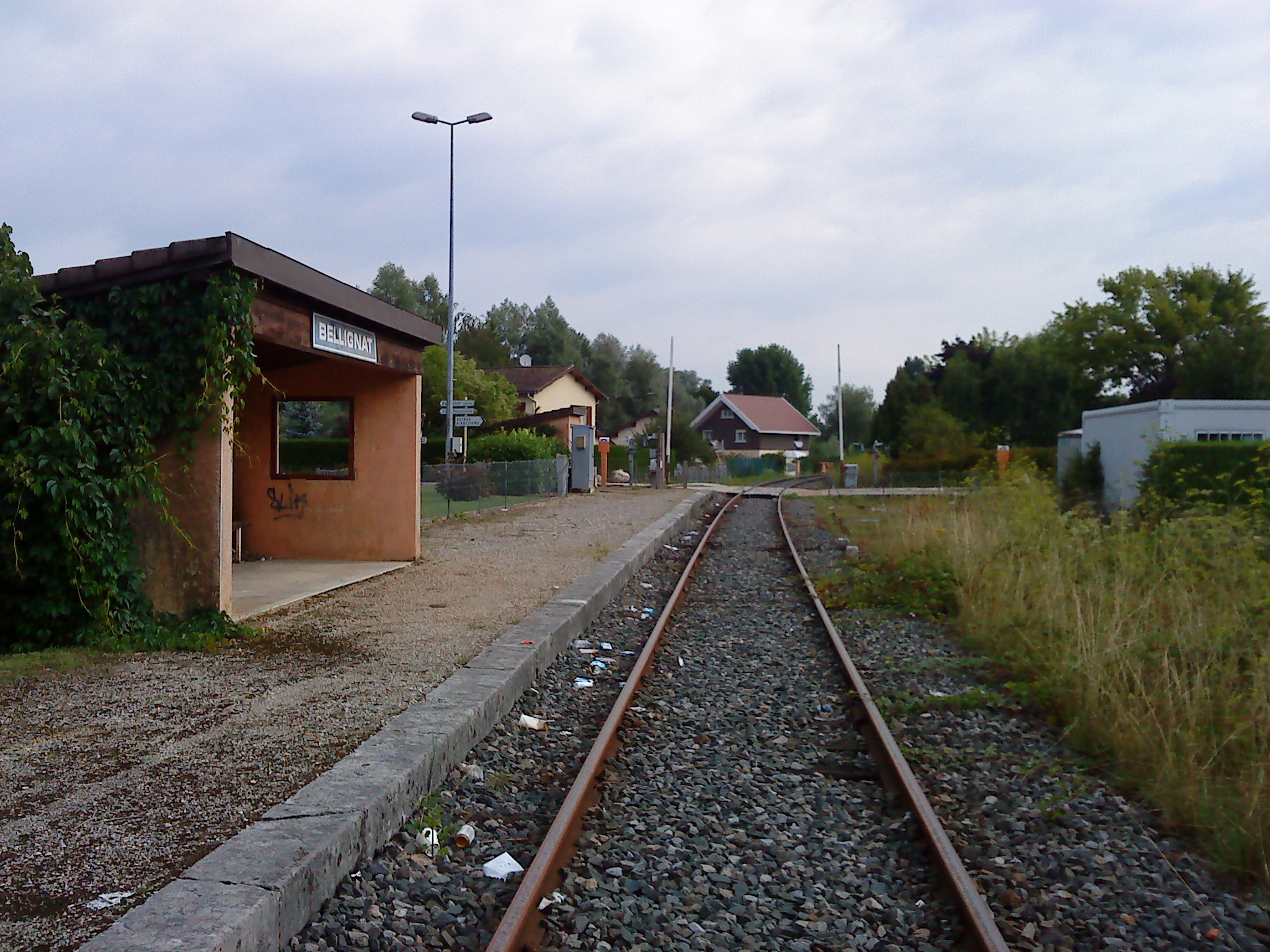
- Train station

- Coat of arms
- Location of Bellignat
- Location within France Location within Auvergne-Rhône-Alpes
- Coordinates: 46°14′32″N 5°37′45″E
- Country: France
- Region: Auvergne-Rhône-Alpes
- Department: Ain
- Arrondissement: Nantua
- Canton: Nantua
- Intercommunality: Haut-Bugey Agglomération

Government
  - Mayor (2026–32): Véronique Ravet
- Area^{1}: 7.84 km^{2} (3.03 sq mi)
- Elevation: 521 m (1,709 ft)
- Highest elevation: 913 m (2,995 ft)
- Lowest elevation: 516 m (1,693 ft)
- Population (2023): 3,525
  - Density: 450/km^{2} (1,160/sq mi)
- Time zone: UTC+01:00 (CET)
  - Summer (DST): UTC+02:00 (CEST)
- INSEE/Postal code: 01031 /01810
- Website: https://www.bellignat.fr/
- ^{1} French Land Register data, which excludes lakes, ponds, glaciers > 1 km^{2} (0.386 sq mi or 247 acres) and river estuaries.

Bellignat (French pronunciation: [bɛliɲa]) is a commune in the Ain department in eastern France. Bellignat station has rail connections to Bourg-en-Bresse and Oyonnax.

== Population ==
Historical population
Year	Pop.	±% p.a.
1968	832	—
1975	1,077	+3.76%
1982	2,602	+13.43%
1990	3,233	+2.75%
1999	3,488	+0.85%
2007	3,472	−0.06%
2012	3,642	+0.96%
2017	3,624	−0.10%
2023	3,525	−0.46%
Source: INSEE

== See also ==
- Communes of the Ain department
