= Bellignat station =

Railway station in Bellignat, France

Coordinates: 46°14′20″N 5°37′49″E

Bellignat
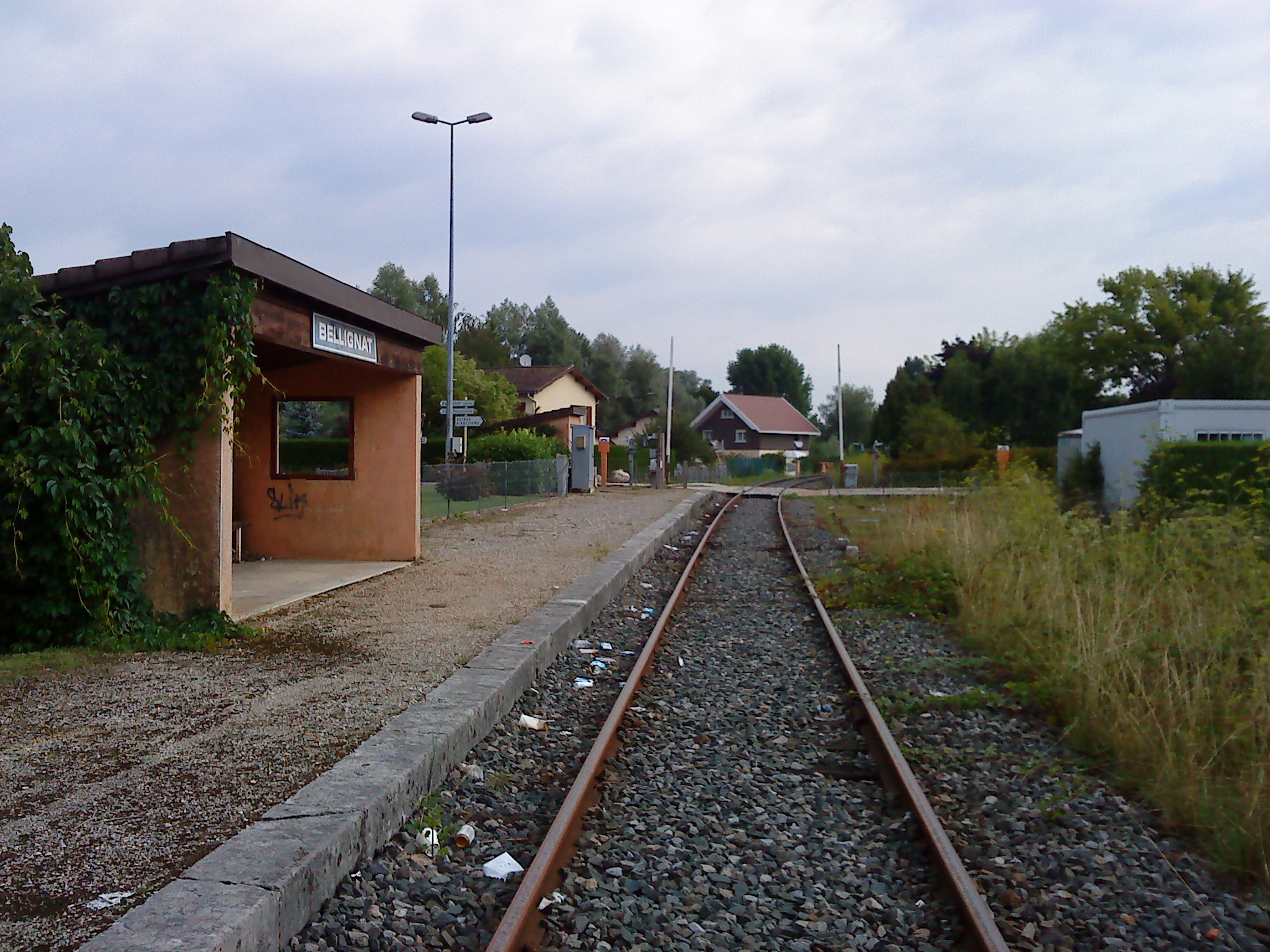
- Bellignat station track and platform.

General information
- Location: Rue de l'Ange; 01100 Bellignat; Ain; France
- Owner: SNCF
- Operator: SNCF
- Line: Andelot-en-Montagne—La Cluse railway
- Distance: 106.818 km
- Platforms: 1
- Tracks: 1

Passengers
- 2023: 5,116

Services
Preceding station	TER Auvergne-Rhône-Alpes	Following station
Brion-Montréal-la-Cluse towards Bourg-en-Bresse	31	Oyonnax Terminus
Location

Bellignat station (French: Gare de Bellignat) is a French railway station located in the commune of Bellignat, Ain department in the Auvergne-Rhône-Alpes region. It is located at kilometric point (KP) 106.818 on the Andelot-en-Montagne—La Cluse railway.

As of 2020, the station is owned and operated by the SNCF and served by TER Auvergne-Rhône-Alpes trains.

== History ==
On 14 August 1892, the municipal council of Bellignat voted to ask for the existing railway halt in the commune to opened to cargo merchants.

In 2023, the SNCF estimated that 5,116 passengers traveled through the station.

== Services ==
=== Passenger services ===
Classified as a PANG (point d'accès non géré), the station is unstaffed without any passenger services.

=== Train services ===
As of 2020, the station is served by TER Auvergne-Rhône-Alpes line 31 trains between Lyon and Oyonnax.

=== Intermodality ===
In addition to passenger vehicle parking, the station is equipped with storage racks and facilities for bicycles.

The station is also served by replacement and supplementary TER bus service from the nearby lycée.

== See also ==
- List of SNCF stations in Auvergne-Rhône-Alpes
