= Brion–Montréal-la-Cluse station =

Railway station in France

Brion–Montréal-la-Cluse
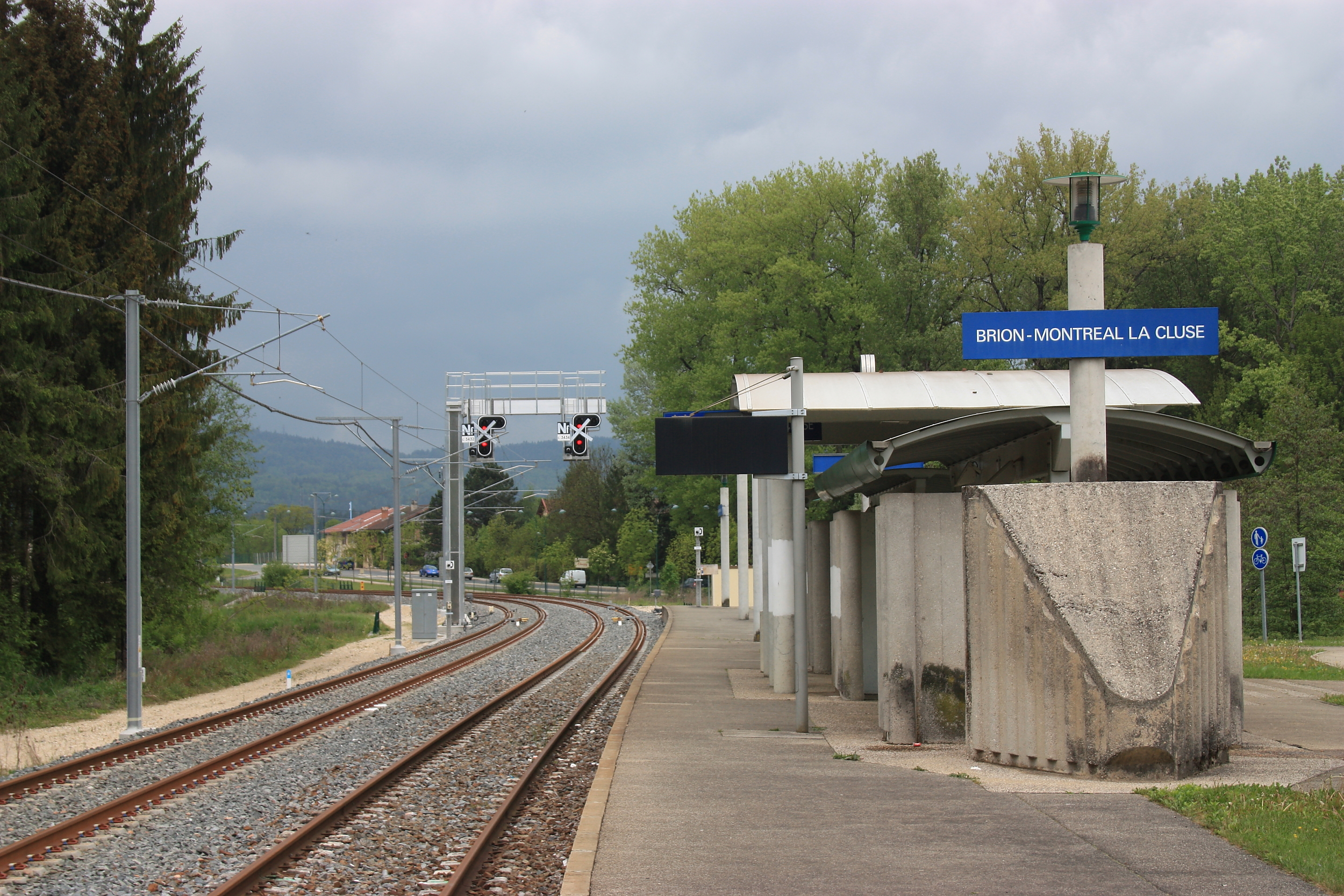
- Station in 2010

General information
- Location: Route du Berthiand; 01460 Brion; Ain; France
- Coordinates: 46.1758°N 5.5585°E
- Elevation: 479 m (1,572 ft)
- Owner: SNCF
- Operator: SNCF
- Line: Ligne du Haut-Bugey
- Distance: 35.618 km
- Platforms: 1
- Tracks: 2

History
- Opened: 1996 then 2010
- Closed: 2005

Passengers
- 2019: 35,922

Services
Preceding station	TER Auvergne-Rhône-Alpes	Following station
Nurieux towards Bourg-en-Bresse	31	Bellignat towards Oyonnax
Location

Brion–Montréal-la-Cluse station (French: Gare de Brion–Montréal-la-Cluse) is a French railway station located in commune of Brion, Ain department in the Auvergne-Rhône-Alpes region. The station is also within close proximity of the commune of Montréal-la-Cluse, for which it is jointly named after. It is located at kilometric point (KP) 35.618 on the Ligne du Haut-Bugey (Bourg-en-Bresse–Bellegarde railway).

Opened in 1996 by the SNCF, the station replaced the now closed La Cluse station. Its layout was further modified during the closure of the Haut-Bugey railway between 2005 and 2010.

As of 2022, the station is owned and operated by the SNCF and served by TER Auvergne-Rhône-Alpes trains.

== History ==
In 2019, the SNCF estimated that 35,922 passengers traveled through the station.

== Services ==
=== Passenger services ===
Classified as a PANG (point d'accès non géré), the station is unstaffed without any passenger services.

=== Train services ===
As of 2022, the station is served by TER Auvergne-Rhône-Alpes trains, which circulate between Bourg-en-Bresse and Oyonnax.

=== Intermodality ===
In addition to car parking, the station is equipped with facilities to enable bicycle storage.

== See also ==
- List of SNCF stations in Auvergne-Rhône-Alpes
