= Brion, Ain =

Commune in Auvergne-Rhône-Alpes, France

Brion
- Commune
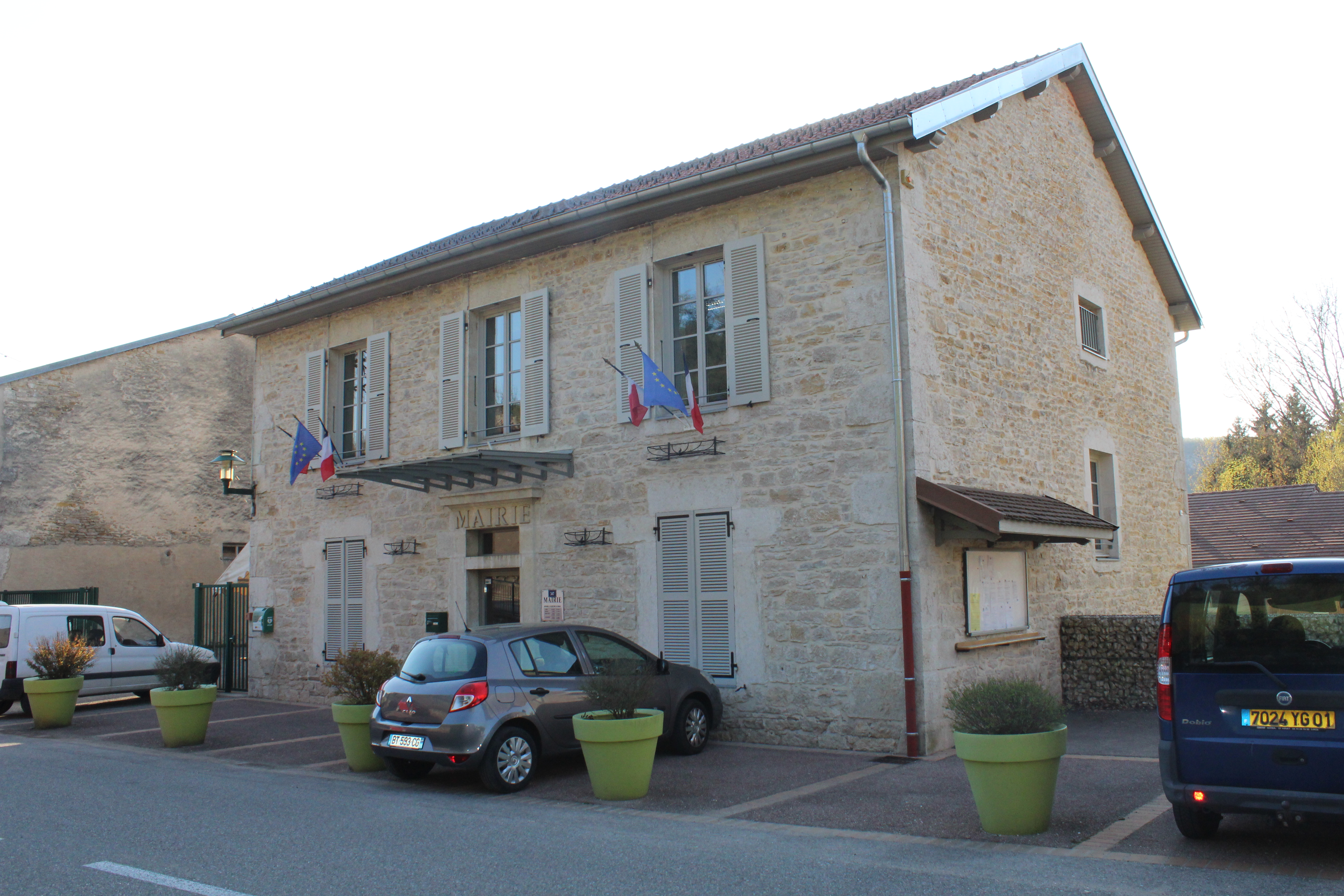
- Town hall
- Location of Brion
- Location within France Location within Auvergne-Rhône-Alpes
- Coordinates: 46°10′22″N 5°33′09″E
- Country: France
- Region: Auvergne-Rhône-Alpes
- Department: Ain
- Arrondissement: Nantua
- Canton: Nantua
- Intercommunality: Haut-Bugey Agglomération

Government
  - Mayor (2026–32): Sébastien Guinet
- Area^{1}: 4.48 km^{2} (1.73 sq mi)
- Elevation: 500 m (1,600 ft)
- Highest elevation: 642 m (2,106 ft)
- Lowest elevation: 469 m (1,539 ft)
- Population (2023): 592
  - Density: 132/km^{2} (342/sq mi)
- Time zone: UTC+01:00 (CET)
  - Summer (DST): UTC+02:00 (CEST)
- INSEE/Postal code: 01063 /01460
- ^{1} French Land Register data, which excludes lakes, ponds, glaciers > 1 km^{2} (0.386 sq mi or 247 acres) and river estuaries.

Brion (French pronunciation: [bʁijɔ̃]) is a commune in the Ain department in eastern France.

The name comes from the Latin word Bria meaning fortress, and it is home to a ruined castle. Brion—Montréal-la-Cluse station has rail connections to Bourg-en-Bresse and Oyonnax.

== Population ==
Historical population
Year	Pop.	±% p.a.
1968	215	—
1975	335	+6.54%
1982	395	+2.38%
1990	587	+5.08%
1999	559	−0.54%
2007	511	−1.12%
2012	517	+0.23%
2017	521	+0.15%
2023	592	+2.15%
Source: INSEE

== See also ==
- Communes of the Ain department
