= List of air shows =

This is a list of air shows throughout the world.

== Major air shows ==
Royal International Air Tattoo, England (2006)

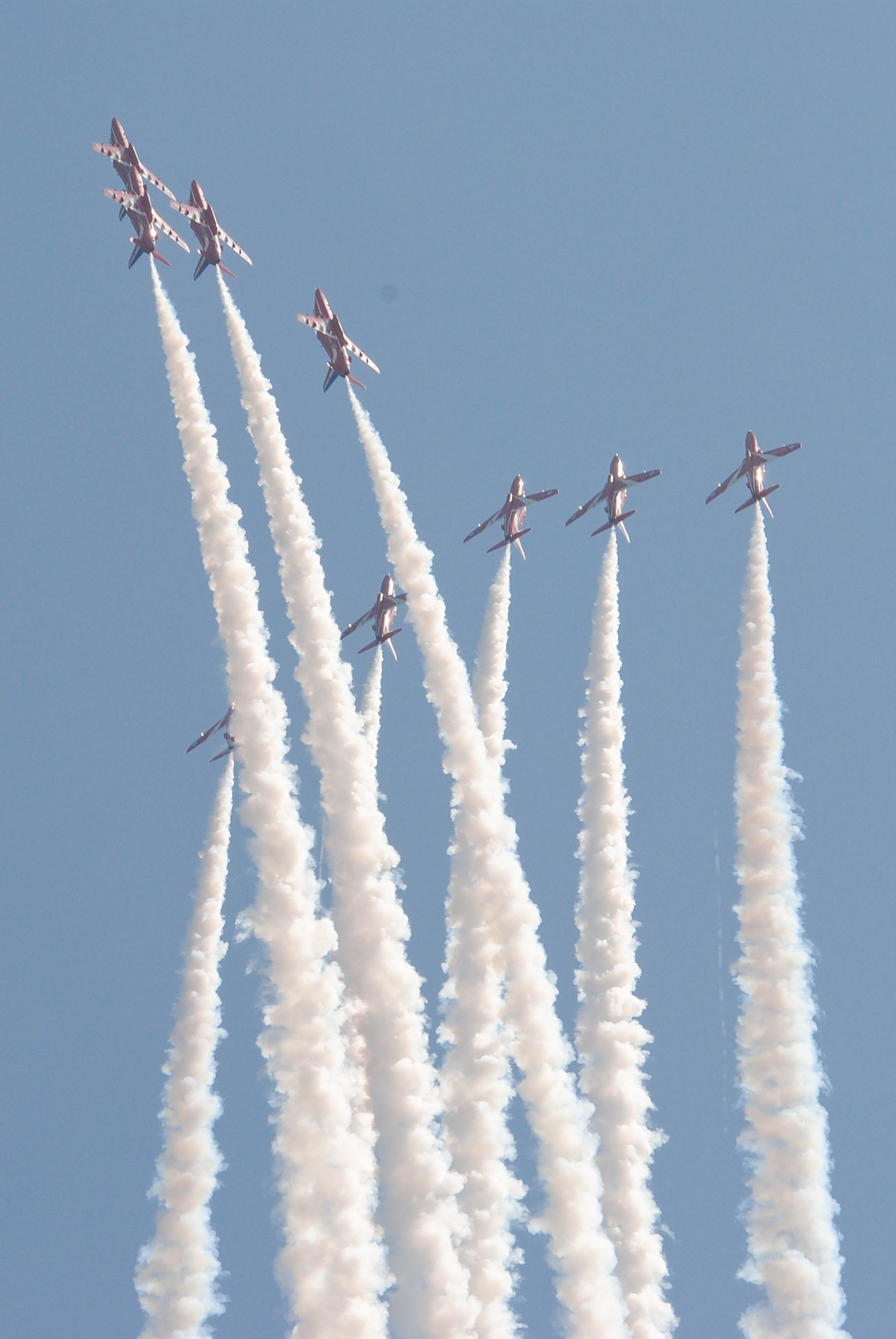
RAF Red Arrows, RAF Waddington Airshow (2013)

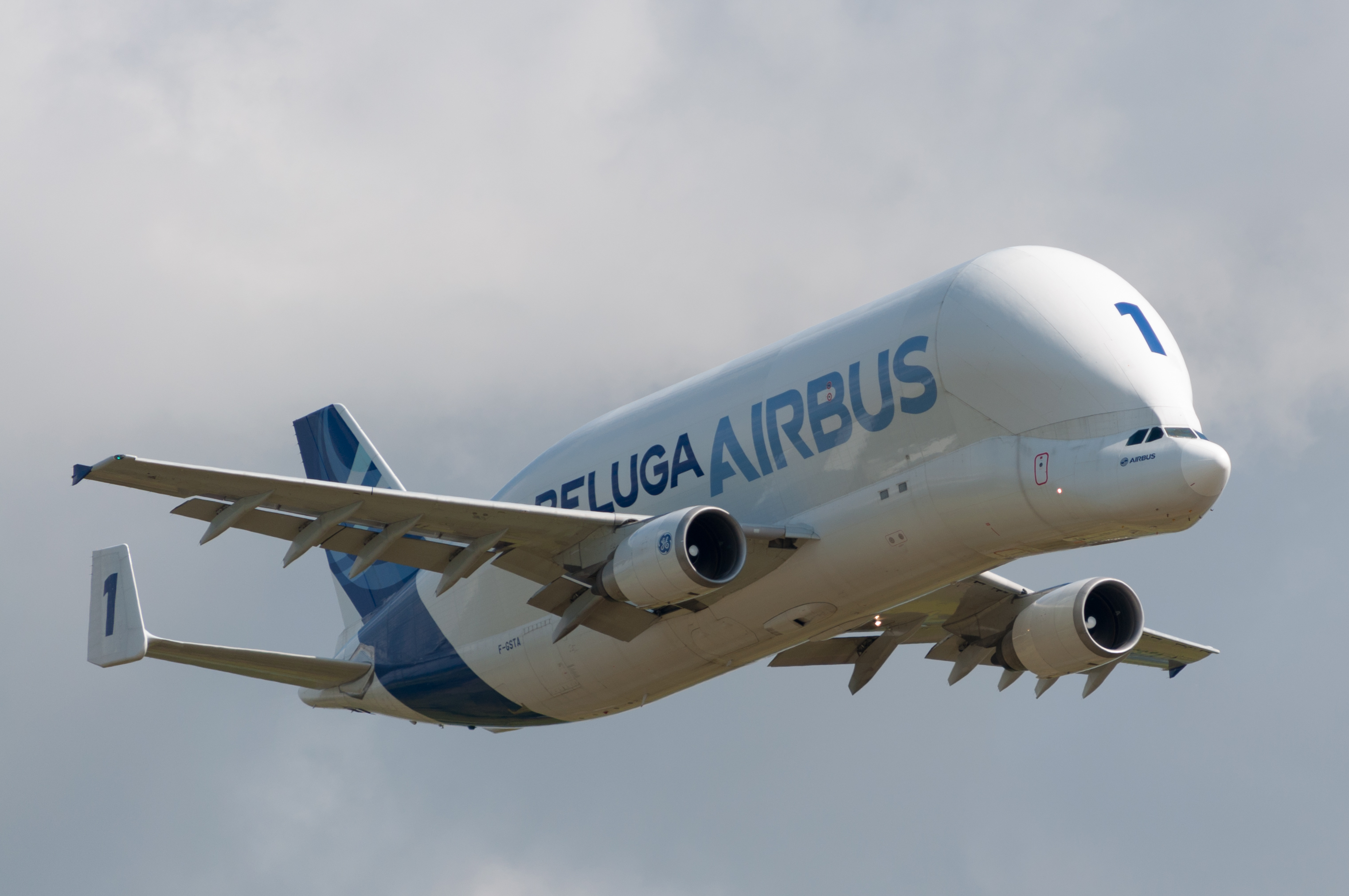
Airbus Beluga at Airexpo 2014

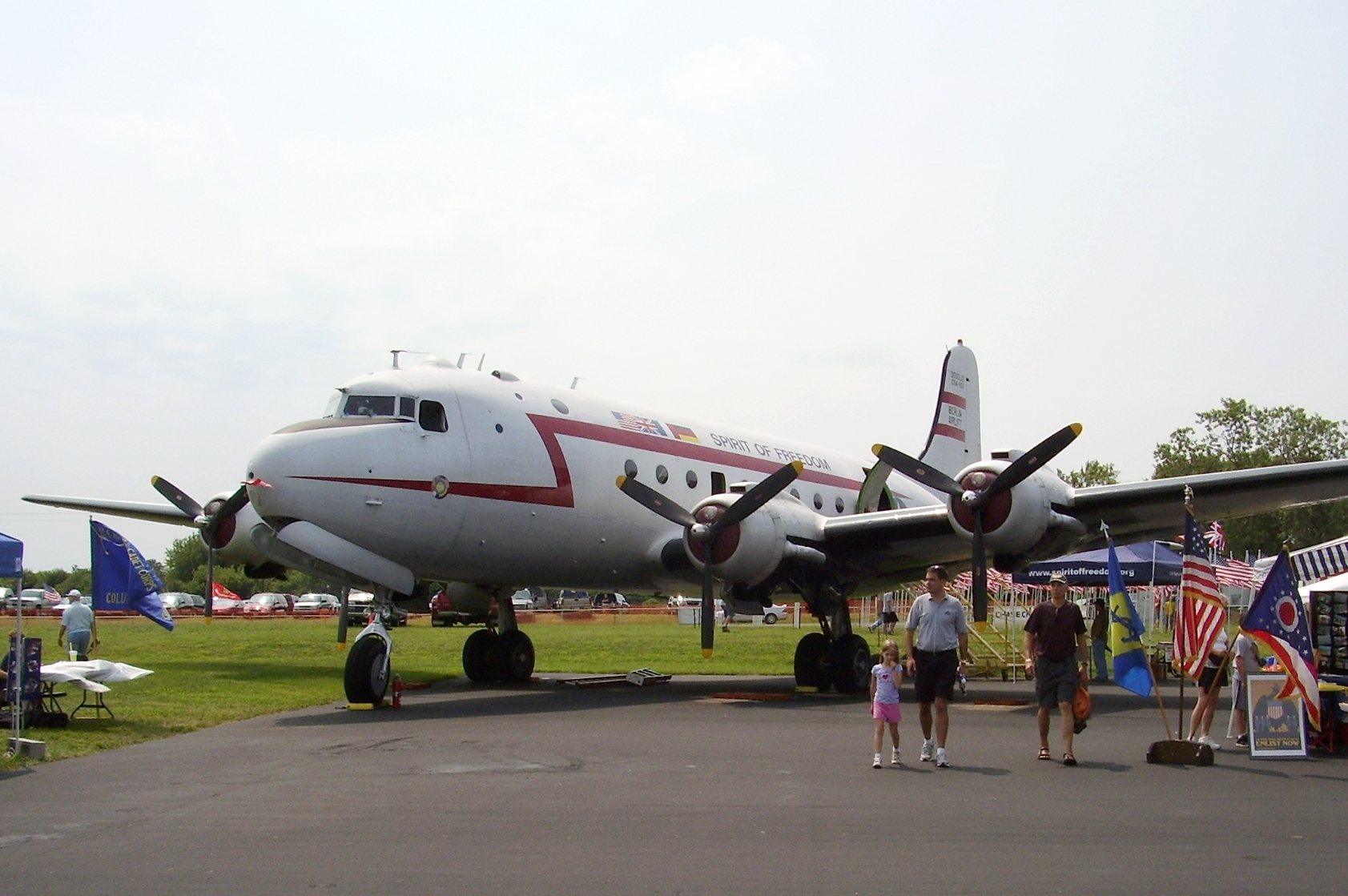
A Douglas C-54 Skymaster, called Spirit of Freedom, a flying museum regarding the Berlin Airlift, at a Lancaster, Ohio air show (2009)

Abbotsford International Airshow
Canada's largest airshow
Aero India
A biennial air show held in Bangalore, India, at the Yelahanka Air Force Station. It was first held in the year 1996 and since then has become one of the largest air shows in the world. In 2009 it had 592 exhibitors from over 25 countries. It is the largest air show in Asia.
Aerosport air show
Created in 1993 at Igualada, the only Spanish airshow dedicated to corporate and sport aircraft
Africa Aerospace and Defence
Aerospace and defence expo combined with an airshow, held every two years in South Africa.
Air/Space America 88
(San Diego, California, U.S.)
Airbourne: Eastbourne International Airshow
(Eastbourne, East Sussex, England, United Kingdom) The world's biggest free seafront air show
Airdrie Regional Airshow
(Airdrie, Alberta, Canada) - Now Wings Over Springbank Airshow (Springbank Airport, Calgary, AB)
Airexpo
(Muret – Lherm Aerodrome, France) - French airshow started in 1987. It is organized by the students of the grandes écoles École nationale de l'aviation civile and those of the Institut Supérieur de l'Aéronautique et de l'Espace.
AirPower
(Military Airport Hinterstoisser, Zeltweg, Steiermark, Austria; Powered by the Austrian Army, Red Bull and the Gouverment of Steiermark)
Airshow London
Canada's largest military airshow
AirShow San Diego
Formerly Wings over Gillespie Commemorative Air Force static airshow, El Cajon, California, U.S.
Antique Aircraft Fly-In and Airshow
(Fredericksburg, Virginia, U.S.) This annual air show was discontinued in the early 1980s, with the last event taking place in 1983.
Alberta (Edmonton) International Airshow
Held in Edmonton at the Villeneuve Airport since 2015. Previously at CFB Namao (now CFB Edmonton) until becoming an army base in 1994, and at Edmonton International Airport in 1996 and 2002.
Asian Aerospace
Held in Singapore since its inception in 1981, until moving to Hong Kong in 2007
Australian International Airshow
Held every two years at Avalon Airport
Aviation Calgary Expo
(Calgary, Alberta, Canada) Static airshow, with DC-3 flights
Aviation Nation
(Nellis Air Force Base) Every November
Bali International Air Show
Held every two years at Ngurah Rai International Airport.
Bethpage Air Show
(Jones Beach State Park, New York, U.S.)
Blackpool Air Show
(Blackpool, England). Britain's oldest air show, first held in 1909 as Blackpool Aviation Week. Held annually.
Boshears Skyfest
(Augusta, Georgia U.S.)
Bournemouth Air Festival
(United Kingdom)
CAF Airshow
The largest Warbird airshow is held by the Commemorative Air Force at its annual CAF Airshow in Midland, Texas, each October.
California International Airshow
(Salinas, California, U.S.)
Canadian International Air Show
(Toronto, Ontario, Canada)
Charleston Air Force Base Air Expo
(Charleston Field, North Charleston, South Carolina, U.S.)
Chicago Air & Water Show
(Chicago, Illinois, U.S.)
China International Aviation & Aerospace Exhibition
(Zhuhai, Guangdong) The largest airshow in mainland China. It has been held in even years since 1996.
Classic Fighters
(Blenheim, New Zealand)
Cleveland National Air Show
(Cleveland, Ohio, U.S.)
Croatian International Airshow Varaždin
(Varaždin, Croatia)
Culpeper Airfest
(Culpeper, Virginia, U.S.) Dubbed "The Best Little Airshow in the East," this event is held normally on the second Saturday in October. The event features a massive warbird demonstration, made up of mostly of T-6 Texans, and more recently, a performance of the world's only civilian-owned Harrier.
Danish Air Show
(Denmark)
Dubai Airshow
(Dubai, United Arab Emirates) Held since 1989 each November on odd-numbered years, after every Paris Air Show
EAA AirVenture Oshkosh
Organized by the Experimental Aircraft Association at Oshkosh, Wisconsin), it is famous for its crowded fly-in of visitors. The air show includes multiple displays as well as talks by influential people in aviation.
Farnborough International Airshow
(United Kingdom) The world's second largest airshow, after the Paris Airshow, takes place every even year at Farnborough Airport, in Hampshire.
La Ferté-Alais Air Show (Amicale Jean-Baptiste Salis)
Famous for its vintage aircraft from WWII, WWI and the pioneer era.
FIDAE
(Feria Internacional Del Aire y Del Espacio) Held since 1980 at Santiago, Chile. FIDAE takes place at Arturo Merino Benítez International Airport in March every two years.
First State Airshow (formally Thunder Over Dover)
Held at Dover Air Force Base. Reintroduced in 2022 in conjunction with the 75th anniversary of the United States Air Force.
Fleet Week
(various port cities, U.S.)
Flying Legends
One of the premier Warbird air shows in Europe, until 2019, held at Duxford Aerodrome in Cambridgeshire, England on the second Sunday of July every year. Flying legends gathers together Warbirds from across Europe and America.
Fort Lauderdale Air Show (formerly Fort Lauderdale Air and Sea Show)
Fort Lauderdale, Florida, US.
The Flying Circus
(Bealeton, Virginia, U.S.) A weekly barnstorming airshow held on Sundays from May through October. Vintage biplane rides are also available.
Ghana Air Show
The only air show (light aviation) in West Africa is held in Ghana each year in November, hosted by WAASPS.
ILA Berlin Air Show
(Internationale Luft- und Raumfahrtausstellung) (Berlin, Germany)
Ilopango Air Show
(Ilopango International Airport, Ilopango, El Salvador)
Indonesia Airshow
Held in June 1986 at the Kemayoran airport and June 1996 at Soekarno-Hatta International airport
Internationale Luft- und Raumfahrtausstellung
(ILA) (Berlin Air Show) is a large air and aerospace trade show, which, established in 1909, claims (along with Paris) to be the world's oldest.
IPS’AIR
Since 2020, a festival for aviation enthusiasts who want to experience flight simulators or learn more about aircraft at round tables and exhibitions (Ivry-sur-Seine, France)
Iran Kish Air Show
(Kish, Iran)
Iruma Air Show
(Iruma Air Base, Saitama Prefecture, Japan) Held annually on the November 3rd Culture Day holiday
Istanbul Airshow
Organized biennially at Istanbul Atatürk Airport since 1996, this is the single "Civil Only" aviation and airports exhibition in Eurasia.
Jersey International Air Display
(Jersey)
Joint Base Andrews Air & Space Expo 2019
(Joint Base Andrews)
Thessaloniki AirSea Show
(Thessaloniki, Greece)
Kecskemét Air Show
One of East Europe's biggest air shows, Kecskemét Air Show is held at Kecskemét, Hungary.
Langkawi International Maritime and Aerospace Exhibition
(Langkawi, Malaysia) Held at Langkawi Island, Malaysia, on odd-numbered years since 1991

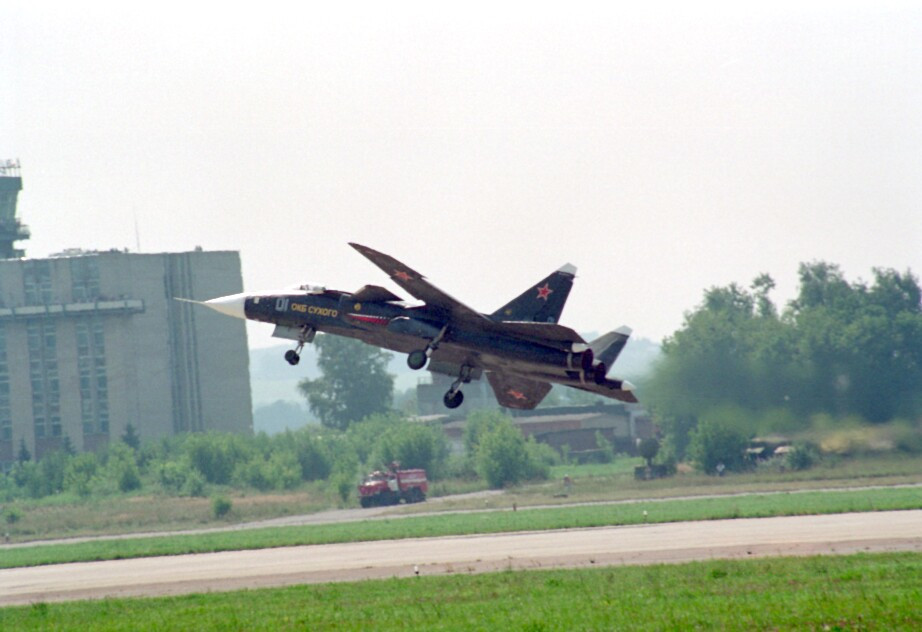
Sukhoi Su-47 Berkut experimental aircraft at MAKS-2001

MAKS
The biggest air show and aerospace trade show in Russia, MAK, is an international air show held near Moscow on Zhukovskiy LII air field. The first show, Mosaeroshow-92, was held in 1992. Since 1993, it was renamed to its current name and is held on odd years.
Malta International Airshow
(Luqa, Malta)
Martinique Air Show
(Martinique, French West Indies)
Milwaukee Air and Water Show
(Milwaukee, Wisconsin)
Miramar Air Show
There are several annual air shows in the United States that display a variety of modern military aircraft, including the Miramar Air Show every October.
National Stearman Fly-In
(Galesburg, Illinois)
Northwest EAA Fly-In
(Arlington, Washington, U.S.)
Oregon International Air Show
(Hillsboro, Oregon, U.S.)
Pacific Airshow
(Formally The Great Pacific Airshow, Formally The Breitling Huntington Beach Airshow) Annual air show held over the beachfront in Huntington Beach, California. The show which includes many big name military and civilian performers, regularly draws over one million spectators over the three day event.

Pacific Air Show

Paris Air Show (Le Bourget Air Show)
(France) Claims (along with Berlin) to be the world's oldest. Established in 1909 and attracting approximately 400,000 visitors, it is held in June on odd-numbered years, alternating with the British Farnborough Airshow held in July on even-numbered years.
Quad City Air Show
(Davenport, Iowa), U.S.)
Radom Air Show
(Radom, Poland)
RAFA Shoreham Airshow
(Shoreham, West Sussex, England, United Kingdom)

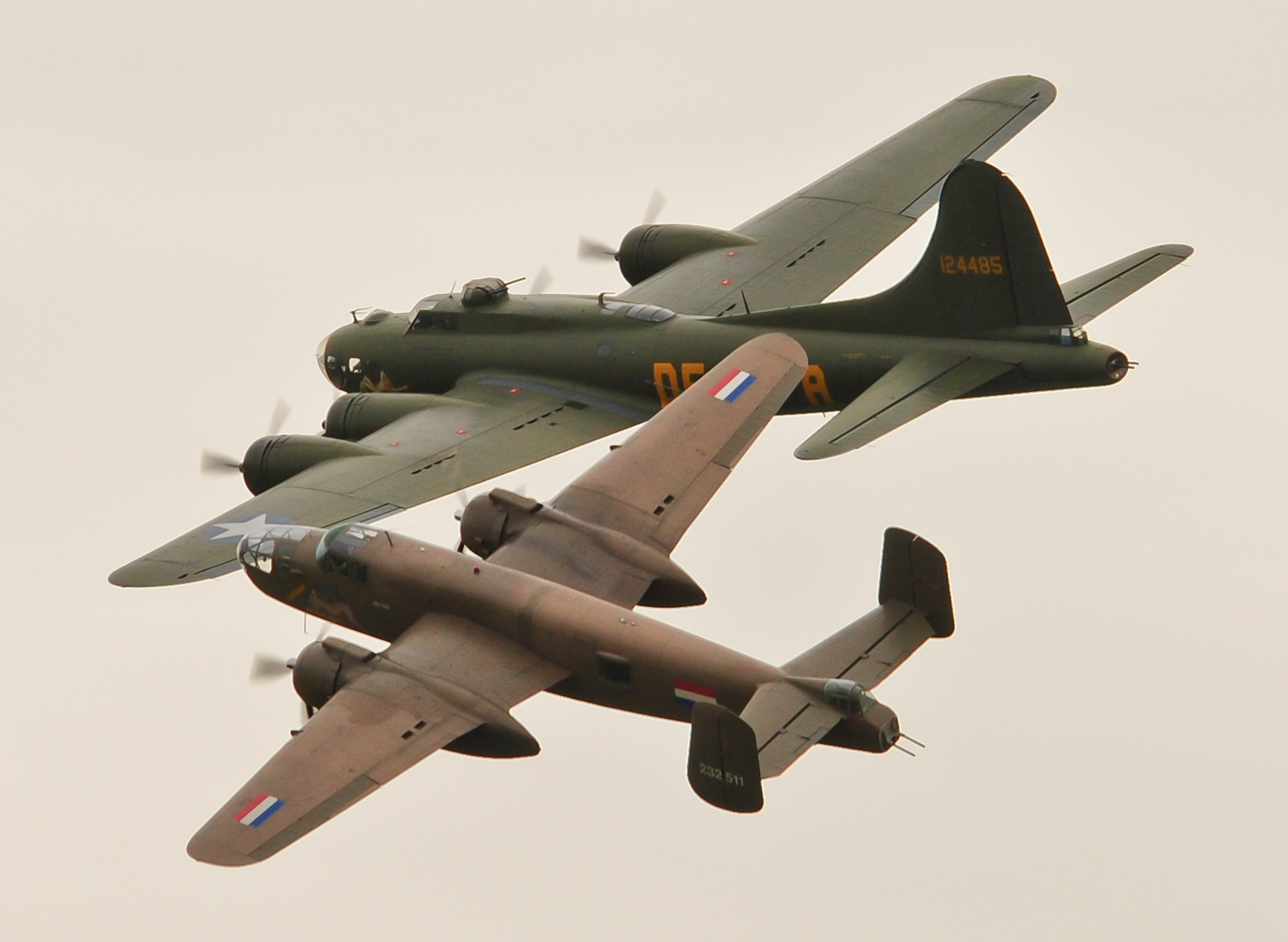
B-25 Mitchell and B-17, Shoreham Airshow (2013)

Redhill Airshow
(Redhill, Surrey, England, United Kingdom)
Reno Air Races
Also known as the National Championship Air Races, this takes place annually in September at the Reno Stead Airport a few miles north of Reno, Nevada. It includes several days of qualifying followed by four and a half days of multi-aircraft heat racing culminating in the Unlimited Class Gold Race on Sunday afternoon. The event also features civil airshow acts and military flight demonstrations between races, plus vendor areas and a large civil and military static aircraft display.
Roskilde Airshow
(Roskilde Airport, Roskilde, Denmark)
Rotorfest
(Brandywine Airport, West Chester, Pennsylvania, U.S.) All helicopter air show
Royal International Air Tattoo
The world's largest military air show is the Royal International Air Tattoo at RAF Fairford, United Kingdom. The RIAT gathers military aircraft and military display teams from all over the world.
Royal Netherlands Air and Space Force
Open days (various military airports in the Netherlands)
Seafair
(Seattle, Washington, U.S.)
Seething Airfield Charity Airday
(Seething, Norfolk, England, United Kingdom)
Seoul ADEX
The Seoul ADEX, formerly known as the Seoul Airshow, was first inaugurated at Seoul Airport in 1996. In 2009, it was renamed Seoul ADEX after merging with the ground defense exhibition, and has since grown into the largest aerospace and defense exhibition in Korea.
Selfridge Air National Guard Base (Selfridge Open House & Int'l Air Show)
(Detroit, Michigan, U.S.)
Serbian Air Show
(Batajnica Air Base, Belgrade, Serbia)
Singapore Airshow
Held in February on even-numbered years at the Changi Exhibition Centre, which was the source of the dispute between Asian Aerospace organisers
Selangor Aviation Show
Dedicated for the business and general aviation and helicopters, Selangor Aviation Show will be a regional networking platform for industry players in showcasing the future of aviation and aerospace industry.
SHG Airshow
(Sivrihisar, Turkey) Held in September at Sivrihisar Aviation Center since 2015
Southport Airshow
(Southport, England) The largest air show in the north west of England
Sun 'n Fun
The annual Sun 'n Fun air show in Lakeland, Florida is an independent corporation, famous for its crowded fly-in of visitors and usually held in the second or third week of April.
Sunderland International Airshow
(Seaburn, Sunderland, England, United Kingdom) Europe's largest free annual air show. Takes place over Roker and Seaburn sea front. It takes place over the course of three days each July.
Stuart Air Show (formerly VNA Air Show)
Stuart, Florida, United States. It takes place every November at Witham Field
Tannkosh
The closest European equivalent to Oshkosh is Tannkosh, held annually at Tannheim airfield in Germany.
Thunder over the Boardwalk
(Atlantic City, New Jersey, U.S.)
Thunder Over Louisville
(Louisville, Kentucky, U.S.)
Thunder Over Michigan
(Ypslianti, Michigan, U.S.) Held annually at historic Willow Run Airport, in Belleville, Michigan.
Tico Warbird Airshow
(Titusville, Florida, U.S.)
Vectren Dayton Air Show
(Dayton, Ohio, U.S.)
Volkel in de Wolken Hamilton Airshow
(Volkel Air Base, Netherlands)
Waddington International Airshow
the Royal Air Force's largest air show is held annually at RAF Waddington, United Kingdom. The airshow features participants from across the world and showcases the work of the RAF and its allies.
Warbirds over Wanaka
(Wānaka, New Zealand) A military oriented show is held every two years in Wānaka, New Zealand.
Windsor International Air Show
(Windsor, Ontario, Canada)
Wings and Wheels
(Dunsfold Park, Surrey, England, United Kingdom)
Wings Over Springbank Airshow
Wings Over Houston
(Ellington Airport, Houston, Texas, U.S.)
Wings over Pittsburgh
(Pittsburgh International Airport, Pittsburgh, Pennsylvania, U.S.)
Wings Over Wayne
(Seymour Johnson Air Force Base, Goldsboro, North Carolina, U.S.)
Wings Over Illawarra
(Shellharbour Airport, Albion Park Rail, 2527, NSW, Australia)

== Historic air shows ==
- 1909: The "Internationale Luftschiffahrt-Ausstellung" was first held in Frankfurt am Main, Germany, from July 10 to October 17, 1909, later becoming the Internationale Luft- und Raumfahrtausstellung (ILA) and as such can lay claim to being the oldest aviation show in the world.
- 1909: Grande Semaine d'Aviation de la Champagne at Reims in France in August 1909. Attended by most of the important aviators of the time, including Glenn Curtiss, who won the Gordon Bennett Trophy competition. This show inspired John Moisant.
- 1910: Los Angeles International Air Meet at Dominguez Field from January 10 to January 20, 1910. Participants included Glenn Curtiss, Charles Hamilton, Lincoln Beachey and Louis Paulhan. The Los Angeles Times called it "one of the greatest public events in the history of the West."
- 1910: Harvard-Boston Aero Meet at the Harvard Aviation Field in Atlantic, Massachusetts, from September 3 to September 13, 1910. It was the first major air event in the eastern United States and offered $90,000 in prizes and appearance fees. Participants included the Wright brothers, the Glenn Curtiss exhibition teams and Claude Grahame-White. This show inspired Harriet Quimby to become the first female pilot in the United States.
- 1910: International Aviation Meet at Belmont Park offered approximately $75,000 in prize money. Participants included Count Jacques de Lesseps, Roland Garros, Claude Grahame-White, Glenn Curtiss, John Moisant, Arch Hoxsey, Ralph Johnstone and Charles Hamilton.
- 1925–1931: Ford National Reliability Air Tour offered the Edsel B. Ford Trophy; it was inscribed, "This trophy is offered to encourage the up-building of commercial aviation as a medium of transportation."
- 1940: Coinciding with Queen Wilhelmina's birthday on August 31, 1940, the Dutch East Indies (now Indonesia) government held the first Aerospace Exhibition held in Kemayoran Airport. In addition to KNILM aircraft, a number of private aircraft under the auspices of the Aeroclub in Batavia also participated in enlivening the event. The aircraft were the Buckmeister Bu-131 Jungmann, de Haviland DH-82 Tigermoth, Piper J-3 Cub, and Walraven 2 which had flown from Batavia to Amsterdam on September 27, 1935.
- 1945-1950: The "Thrasher Brothers Aerial Circus" featuring the Twin Ercoupe and the "World's Smallest Airport", was born after World War II when the oldest brother, Grady Thrasher, purchased some surplus planes — Piper Cubs, a Stearman biplane and two Ercoupes — from the U.S. Army for $200 to $500 each and a new 1946 Ford car. The three brothers performed aerial stunts, including one in which Bud Thrasher stood on top of the plane as it coursed the skies. Their most popular stunt was landing a plane on a wooden platform on top of a moving car, then taking off again.
- 1977: Golden Wings over Richmond (October 15–16, 1977), Richmond, Virginia, U.S. This mega air event commemorated the 50th anniversary (1927–1977) of both Charles Lindbergh's historic flight from New York to Paris and of Richmond International Airport (then known as Byrd International Airport). Festivities included a World War I dogfighting reenactment, a chronological fly-in of various historical aircraft from the 1900s up to the present day, performances of top aerobatic acts of the day; and a flight demonstration of the Concorde, which marked the aircraft's only visit to Richmond. A severe thunderstorm shortened the October 16th show.
- 1986: The Indonesian Air Show 1986 at Kemayoran Airport in November 30, 1986. In the exhibition, there were also aerial acrobatics from the Red Arrows (British Air Force), Royal Jordanian and Mirage 2000 from France.
- 1996: The Indonesian Air Show 1996 at Soekarno Hatta Airport, Cengkareng IN 22-30 June 1996. As the host, IPTN (Industri Pesawat Terbang Nusantara) which is now PT Dirgantara Indonesia (PTDI) exhibited its latest flagship product at that time, namely the prototype of the IPTN N-250 regional passenger aircraft. For civilian aircraft that attracted much attention from visitors were the Concorde supersonic passenger jet and the Boeing 777 short-bodied aircraft. The event was also enlivened by the presence of the Red Arrows aerobatic team from England, The Roulettes Australia, the Indonesian Air Force's Blue Eagles, and a fighter jet flypast from the US Navy aircraft carrier. The plan was that after the 1996 aerospace exhibition, it would be followed by the Asia Pacific technology exhibition (ASPHAS 1998) which was not only an exhibition for aerospace but also for all technological developments. However, due to the economic crisis since 1997, the exhibition was no longer held. However, the Defense Department of the Republic of Indonesia since the 2000s has held a defense exhibition that was not as big as the 1996 aerospace exhibition.

== See also ==
- Hot air balloon festival
- List of air show accidents and incidents
- List of air shows in Australia
- List of air shows in Canada
- List of air shows in Japan
- List of air shows in Baltimore
