= Ohio–Serbia National Guard Partnership =

Ohio–Serbia State Partnership
- Part of the U.S. European Command State Partnership Program
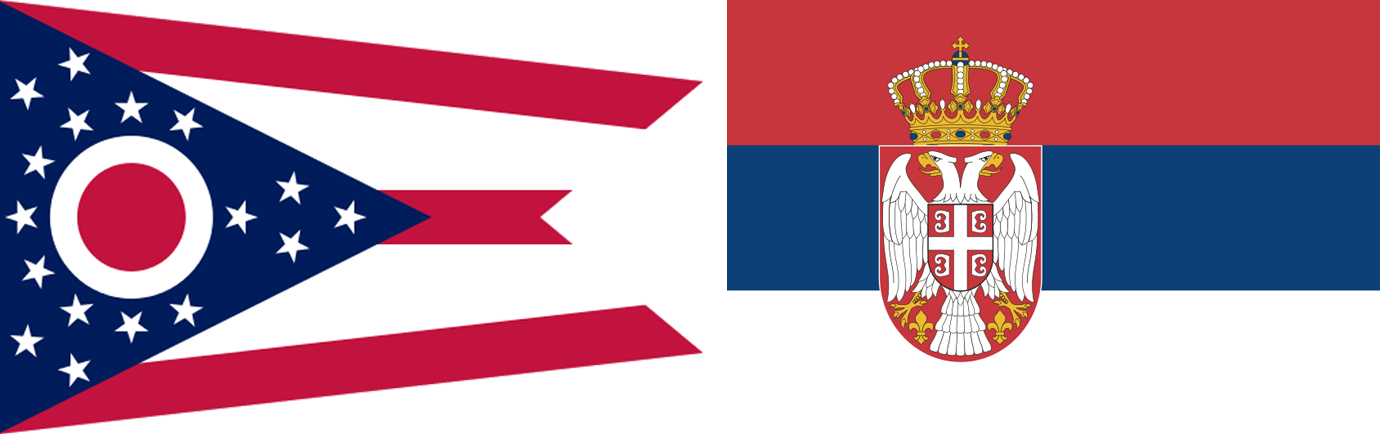
- Origin: 2006
- Country president: Aleksandar Vučić
- Prime minister: Đuro Macut
- Minister of defense: Bratislav Gašić
- Ambassador to U.S.: Dragan Šutanovac
- Ambassador to Serbia: Mark Brnovich
- Honorary Consul to Ohio: Alexander Machaskee
- State Governor: Mike DeWine
- Adjutant general: MG John C. Harris, Jr.
- 2012 Engagements: 16
- NATO member: No
- EU member: Accession candidate

The Ohio–Serbia National Guard Partnership is one of 25 European partnerships that make-up the U.S. European Command State Partnership Program and one of 88 worldwide partnerships that make-up the National Guard State Partnership Program. The country of Serbia signed a bilateral affairs agreement with the U.S. Department of Defense and the state of Ohio in 2006 establishing the Ohio-Serbian State Partnership program. With a substantial Serbian-American community in Cleveland (as well as other Ohio cities) it was a natural fit to create this partnership.

Since then, Ohio and Serbia have conducted over a hundred SPP events in a host of security cooperation activities ranging from bilateral familiarizations, small unit exchanges, exercises, senior military and civic leader visits to the potential development of future Medical Readiness Training Exercise (MEDRETE).

The state partners actively participate in a host of security cooperation activities ranging from bilateral familiarization and training-like events, to exercises, fellowship-style internships and civic leader visits. All activities are coordinated through the Theater Combatant Commanders, the US Ambassadors' country teams and other agencies as appropriate, to ensure that National Guard support is tailored to meet both U.S. and Serbia's objectives.

== Overview ==
"While the State Partnership usually starts as cooperation in the military sector, it can quickly grow into a civilian relationship. Our main contribution in this effort is out experience as citizen-soldiers and airmen. However I believe the partnership is a mutual cooperation and we will learn from each others' experiences. We can show the value of the reserve force whose members are full-time civilians and part-time service members and the unique contributions those members bring to the table." - MG Greg Wayt, former Adjutant General, Ohio National Guard

- State Partnership was established in 2006
- The current President of the United States is Donald Trump
- The current US Secretary of Defence is Pete Hegseth
- The current Governor of Ohio is Mike DeWine
- The current President of Serbia is Aleksandar Vučić
- The current Defense Minister of Serbia is Bratislav Gašić
- The current Chief of the Serbian General Staff is Milan Mojsilović
- Serbia's military budget is roughly $1.4 billion (approx. 2.1% of GDP) as of 2023
- The Serbian army has 40,075 active and 50,000 reserve personnel
- Serbia does not participate in M2M events in which Kosovo is treated as an independent state

== History ==
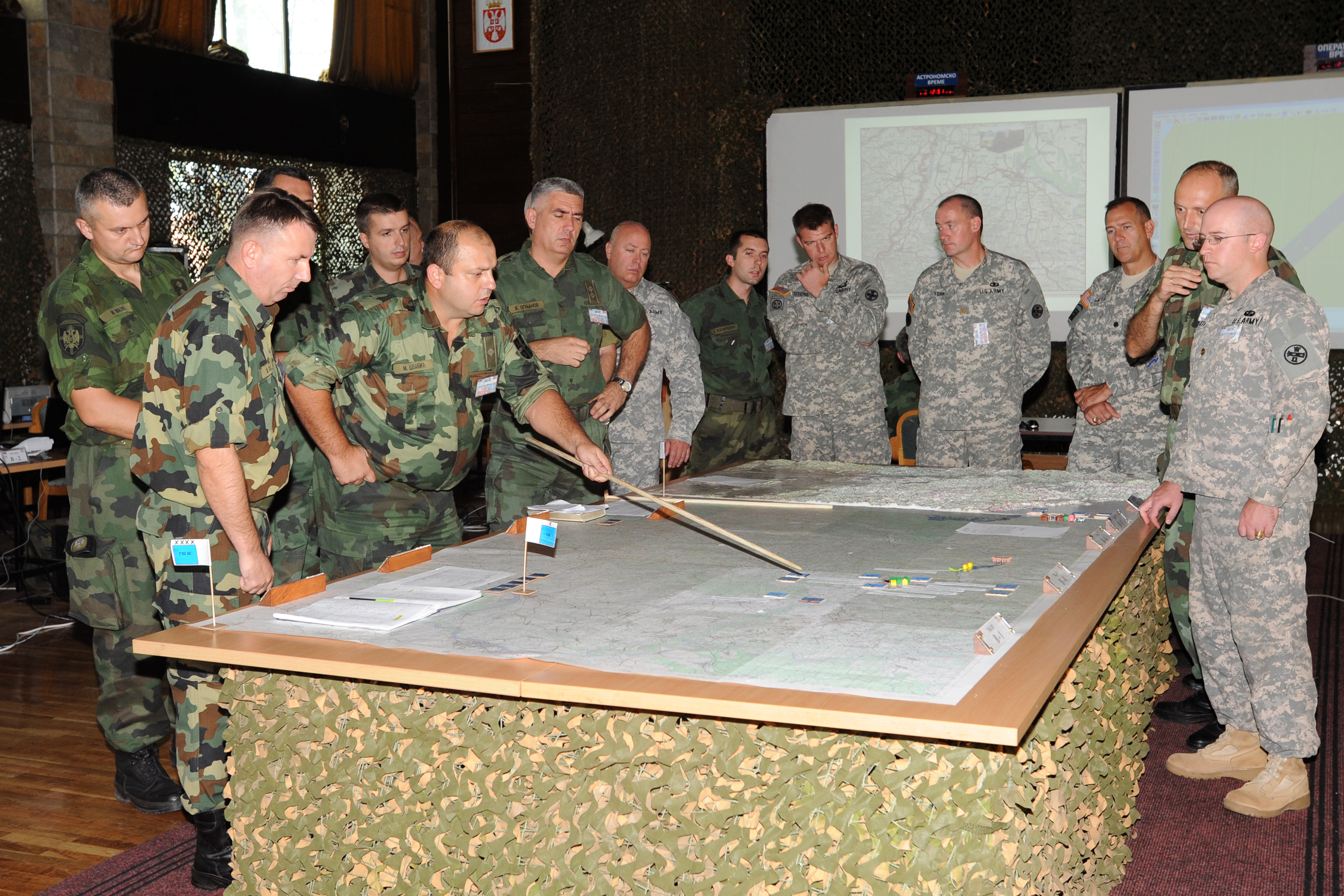
Soldiers from Ohio and Serbia discuss an exercise on a map.

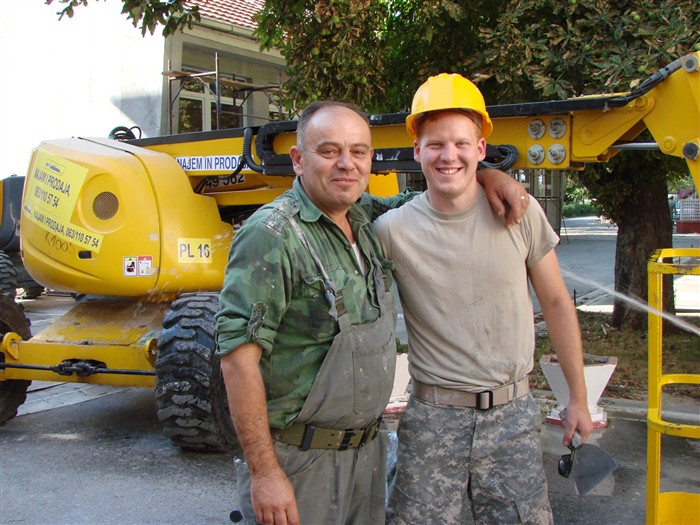
Soldiers from Ohio and Serbia completing renovations at an elementary school in Lapovo, Serbia.

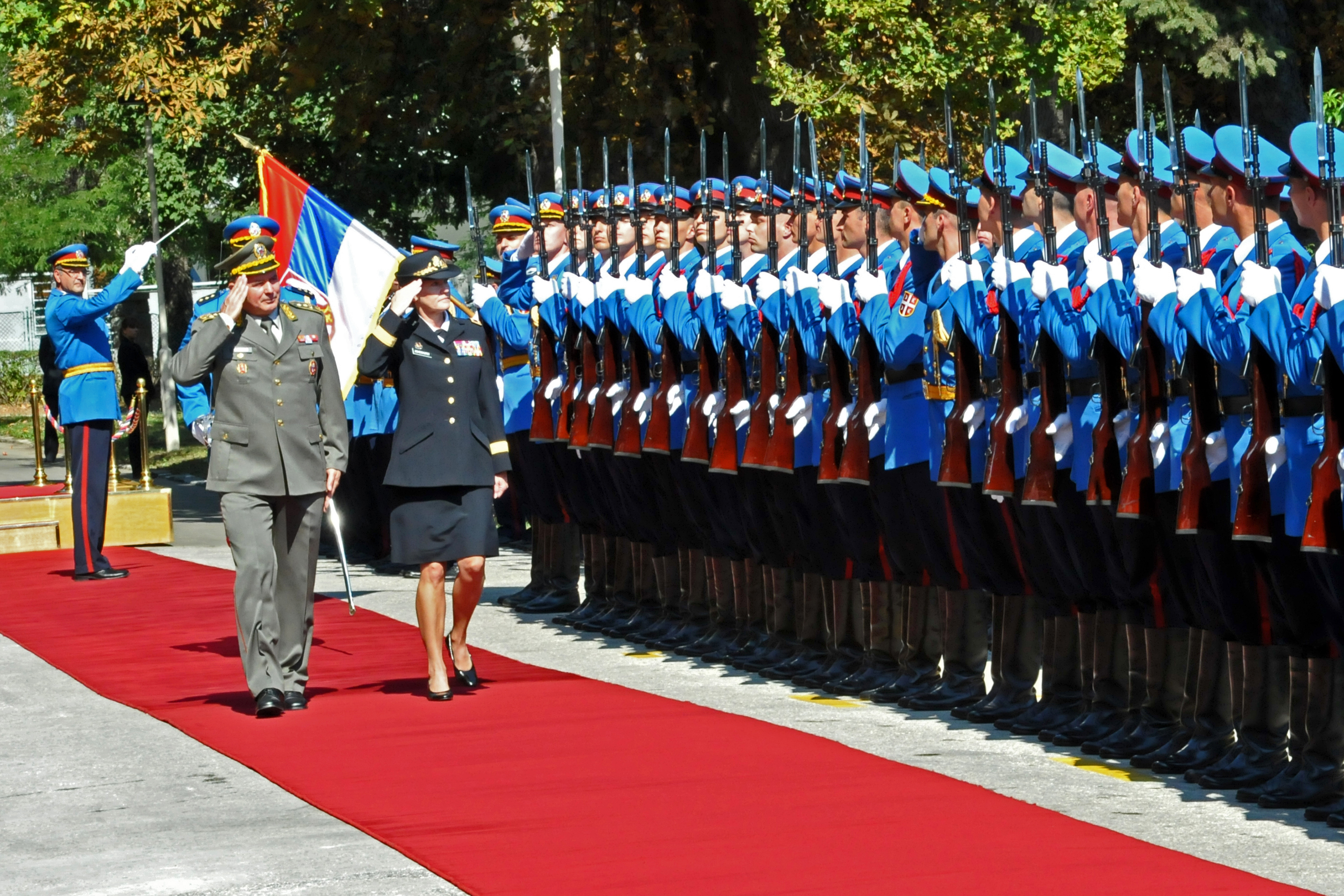
Gen. Miloje Miletić (left), Serbia's chief of general staff, and Maj. Gen. Deborah A. Ashenhurst, Ohio adjutant general, conduct a pass in review of the Serbian Ceremonial Honor Guard Sep. 12, 2011.

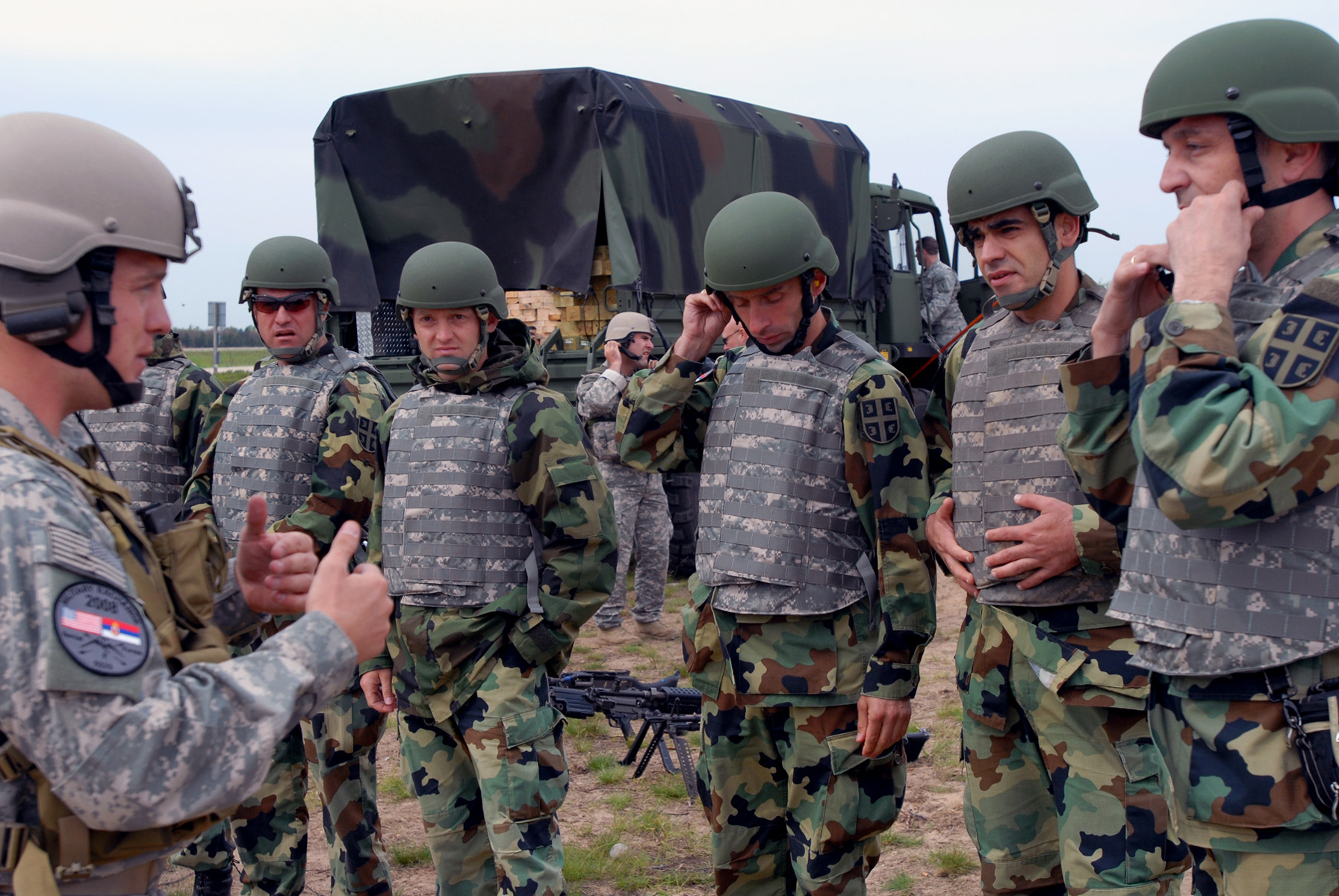
An Ohio National Guard Special Forces soldier briefs the Serbian 63rd Parachute Brigade, June 12 on a Camp Grayling, Michigan firing range.

The National Guards of the U.S. states started cooperation programs with the armies of European countries in 1993, the first to establish such cooperation were Michigan National Guard and Army of Latvia. Most of the armies of Central and Eastern European countries started their partnership with the U.S. National Guards since then. As of 2023, the last ones to form a partnership were Austria and Vermont, who started their cooperation in October 2021 and Norway and Minnesota, who started their partnership in February 2023.

The Ohio National Guard already had a partnership with the Hungarian Army since 1993. When Serbia started seeking for a partnership with one of the U. S. National Guards, it was decided that Ohio would accept the partnership. The reason for this is the existence of a large Serbian community in the Great Lakes region, which, apart from Illinois, Pennsylvania and Indiana, is very numerous in Ohio, primarily in Cleveland, but also the fact that the long-term governor of Ohio was the later senator George Voinovich, who was of Serbian origin and a very respected man in Serbia due to commitment to the peaceful resolution of conflicts in Croatia and Bosnia.

The Ohio and Serbia partnership was formally established in September 2006 with the signing of the Status of Forces Agreement between the United States and Serbia. The agreement was signed by the president Boris Tadić for Serbia and U.S. Secretary of State Condoleezza Rice for the United States. An initial planning meeting was held that same month when the Ohio Adjutant General travelled to Serbia and met with Serbian Armed Forces' Chief of General Staff in 2007.

This provided a unique partnership, capacity-building capability to the combatant commanders and the U.S. Ambassador to Serbia. In doing so Ohio supports the United States national interests and security cooperation goals by engaging with Serbia via military, socio-political and economic conduits at the local, state and national levels. The original goal SPP goal was to execute the first event by the end of 2006. The partnership was able to execute three events including an event in Belgrade and two familiarizations visits to Ohio. Since then, SPP events conducted with Ohio and Serbia has multiplied to 30 proposed events for year 2014, 45 for year 2017 and 60 for fiscal year 2020.

As this relationship has progressed beyond basic cooperation; multiple humanitarian assistance projects; medical forces exchange and regular participation in the Air Show of Serbian Air Force at Batajnica Military Airport, near Belgrade since 2012, Ohio looks forward to continuing to work with the Serbian Armed Forces. On the horizon, the Ohio and Serbian relationship will be instrumental in the continual development of Serbia's Peace Keeping Operations. With the construction of a training center (South Base); sharing in exercise preparations; NCO development and air field support of peacekeeping missions, Ohio and Serbia demonstrates how close coordination and cooperation between the United States and Serbia can promote mutually beneficial events. These events strengthen active theater security and promote greater regional stability.

== Partnership focus ==
Ohio and Serbia intend to continue the 17-year relationship that allows open dialogue that transcends geopolitics while continuing to assist Serbia's interoperability and willingness to partner in peace keeping operations.

The following are EUCOM stated areas of focus for Ohio-Serbia partnership:

- Build partnerships to enhance security and prevent the evolution of local crisis into regional conflicts
- Prevent violent extremist organizations to create transnational threats
- Continue Peace Keeping Operations Base Development and Assistance (South Base)
- Maintain Unit Level Exchanges

The following are FY2023 areas of focus:

- TAG Visit
- Peace Keeping Operations Base Development and Assistance (South Base)
- Consequence Management
- Cyber Defense – Staff Assistance Visit (SAV)
- Helicopter Unit Operations
- Introduction to US ROTC
- Women in professional Armed Forces
- Chaplaincy Development
