= Istanbul Airshow =

Istanbul Airshow, is a biennial show held in Turkey's financial capital Istanbul, that concentrates on the Eurasian and Middle Eastern civil aviation markets. It is organised by AIREX since 1996.

Some of the challenges offered by the Eurasian Market according to AIREX are as follows:

- Tremendous investments made in the region, but specifically in Turkey both in the civil aviation & airport industries.
- Adaptation to the global regulations in the aviation and airport industries.
- Privatization of state owned airline, airport and terminal operations.
- Newly emerging private airlines, air-charter and air-taxi companies.
- Increasing usage of private aircraft for business and general purposes.
- Construction, renovation and modernization of airports and related facilities.
- Alternative financing and management models.
- Necessity to increase both the quality and quantity of training facilities in view of pilots, air traffic control, maintenance, ground support and airline security personnel.
- Increasing number of air travelers from and to the region

== See also ==
- List of airshows
