= Chicago Air & Water Show =

Annual air show

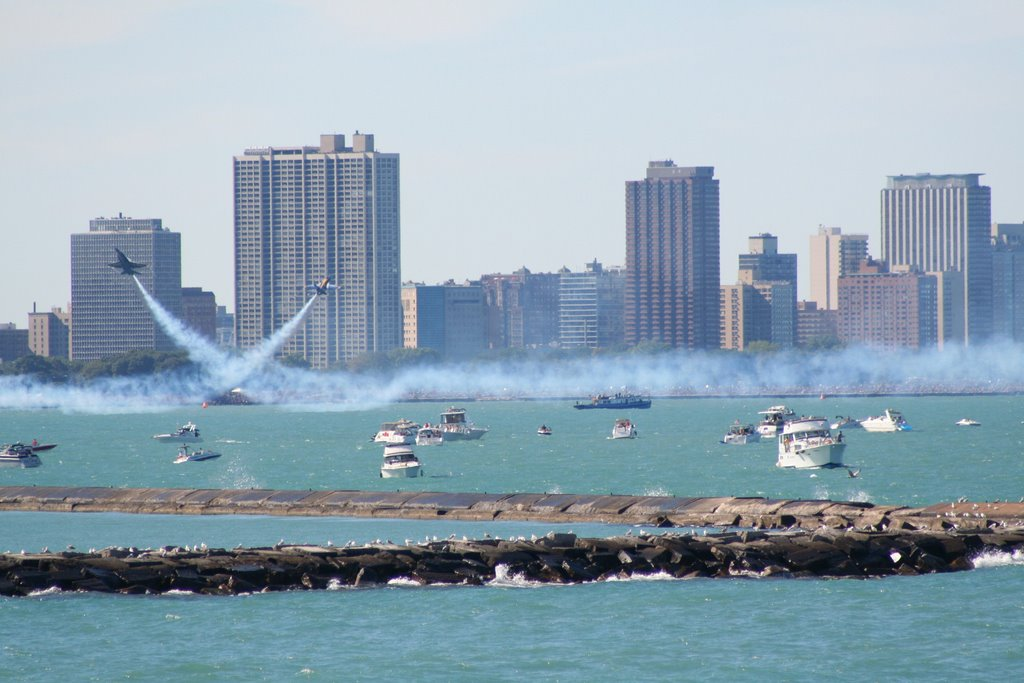
- Military aircraft perform over Lake Michigan
- Genre: Air show
- Dates: every August
- Frequency: Annually
- Locations: Chicago, Illinois
- Country: United States
- Established: 1959; 67 years ago
- Organizer: Department of Cultural Affairs and Special Events

The Chicago Air & Water Show is an annual air show held since 1959 on the shore of Lake Michigan in Chicago. The largest free show of its kind in the United States, The 2025 show was held on August 16–17 with a full rehearsal on August 15.

The air show is a free event showcasing daredevil pilots, parachute teams, and formation jet flyers, as well as water-skiing and boat-jumping demonstrations. With its proximity to city beaches and skyline, the show is visible from almost anywhere along the Chicago lakefront. The show features both civilian and military pilots, and flight teams have been sponsored by companies including Oracle and Red Bull. The U.S. Army Golden Knights have participated frequently, and the U.S. Navy Blue Angels and U.S. Air Force Thunderbirds alternate annually as headliners.

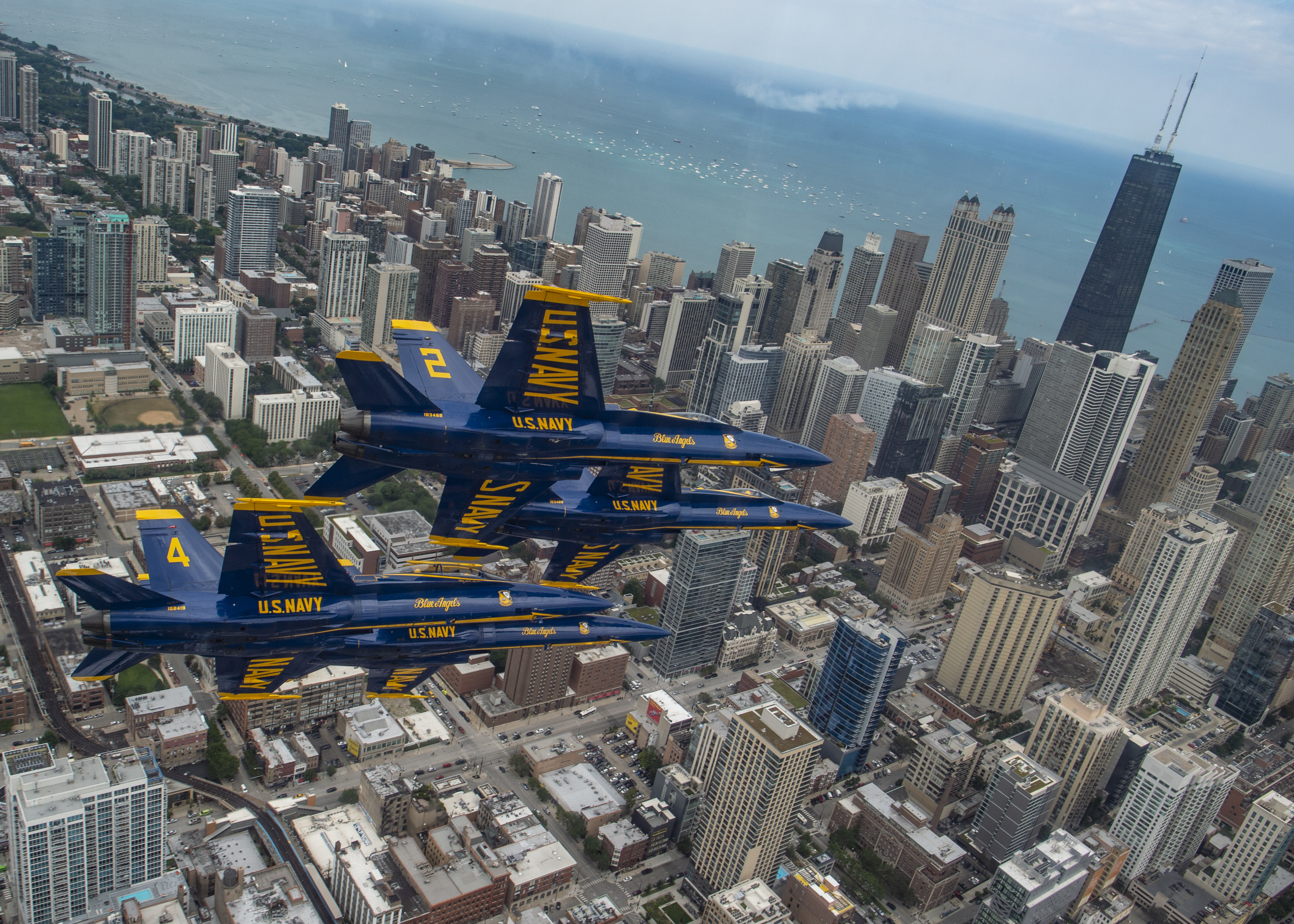
The Blue Angels fly over the city in 2019.

== History ==
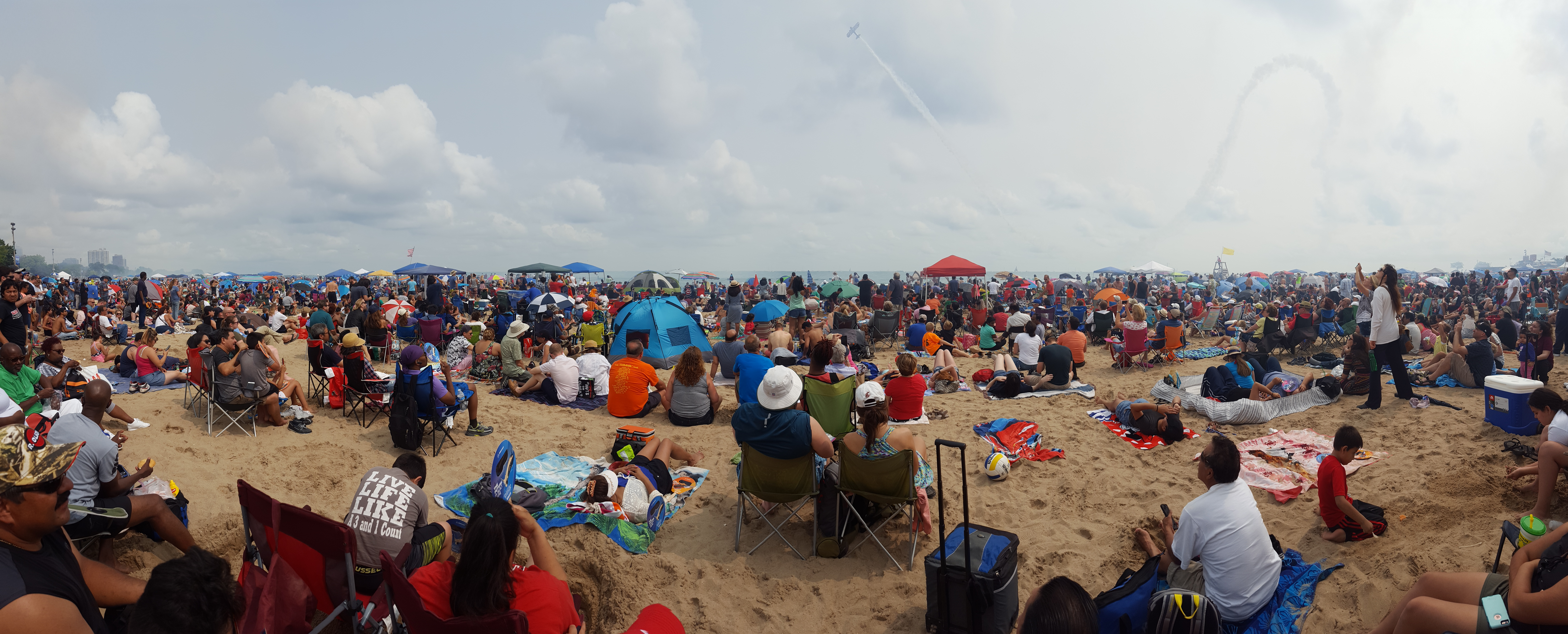
Spectators of the Chicago Air & Water Show from North Avenue Beach

The show was first held in 1959 as the Lakeshore Park Air & Water Show, on a budget of $88. It featured a Coast Guard Air Sea Rescue demonstration, water skiers, a water ballet, games and a diving competition. The following year, the U.S. Air Force Thunderbirds and Golden Knights Parachute Team were added.

Since 1989, the introduction of corporate sponsorships created by Mickey Markoff's marketing efforts has underwritten the show's production costs. It has been managed by the Mayor's Office of Special Events since 1994. Primarily, for most of the event's life the Chicago Air & Water show has been organized by Mr. Rudy Malnati.

In 2020 the show was canceled due to the COVID-19 pandemic.

In 2008, the 50th show was extended from two to three days. On Friday, typically an unofficial preview and rehearsal day, became a part of the scheduled performances. Actress Florence Henderson opened the airshow by singing the American national anthem. The show featured Chicago theater alumnus Bill Murray, who parachuted into the event with the Golden Knights to promote the United Service Organization; and Gary Sinise performed a live concert with his Lt. Dan Band. The concert concluded with a B-1 bomber fly-by and fireworks. Several freestyle jet skiers also competed. LXF Pro Tour champion Gary Burtka lead Team Twangled teammates Greg Brock, Mike Hoffman and Michael Niksic. The Mayor's Office of Special Events estimated that the show drew a record crowd of about 3.1 million.

== Safety Precautions ==
Aircraft take off and land at Gary/Chicago International Airport in Gary, Indiana. All pilots perform stunts over the water in a set area known as a "safety box". This area extends from the lakefront shoreline out to a section on Lake Michigan where recreational boats and kayakers line up for an alternate vantage point.

Organizers work closely with the Federal Aviation Administration (FAA) and city departments on safety procedures. Each day, before flying, all pilots and air personnel must attend morning meetings to receive weather and safety updates. Additionally, the event employs its own air traffic controller who oversees the downtown airspace during show hours. Many of its performers use the Gary Airport in Gary, Indiana, for ground support. In 2005, the U.S. Air Force Thunderbirds ended their demonstration halfway through their routine. During a diamond formation slow-roll pass, the tip of the missile rail on the right wing of the slot (#4) aircraft contacted the left stabilator of the right (#3) aircraft. A four-foot section of the missile rail snapped off, while the #3 aircraft sustained damage described by one of the Thunderbirds pilots as a "medium deep scratch" to the red paint of the stabilator. Amateur video later broadcast on local television news programs showed the missile rail falling into the safety box. No injuries were sustained, but the demonstration was immediately terminated and all aircraft returned to Gary International Airport. The Thunderbirds did not return for the second day's demonstration.

Regarding the audience, people are allowed to bring picnic blankets, chairs and coolers, and are not allowed to take grills, fireworks, alcohol, tents, balloons, weapons, kites, flagpoles, and pets (service animals are an exception) to the watching area.

== Criticism ==
In 2013, Chicago Reader described the show's accompanying noise as a "horrible buzzing" and that it was "back to annoy you for another year."

Colin McMahon wrote in The Chicago Tribune that the "anachronistic" and "perverse" show's "cheap thrills" should be retired.

=== 2015 accident ===
'Statement Regarding Master Sgt. Corey Hood' video from U.S. Army Parachute Team, the Golden Knights

On August 16, 2015, an Army parachutist died from injuries suffered after colliding with another parachutist during the 2015 Air and Water Show, on Saturday, August 15, 2015. The death of Master Sergeant Corey Hood has strengthened calls to discontinue the show, which positions jets and parachuting daredevils within hundreds of feet of dozens of buildings, as well as pedestrians, all up and down Lake Michigan.

== See also ==
- Milwaukee Air and Water Show
- List of air shows
