= Kecskemét Air Base =

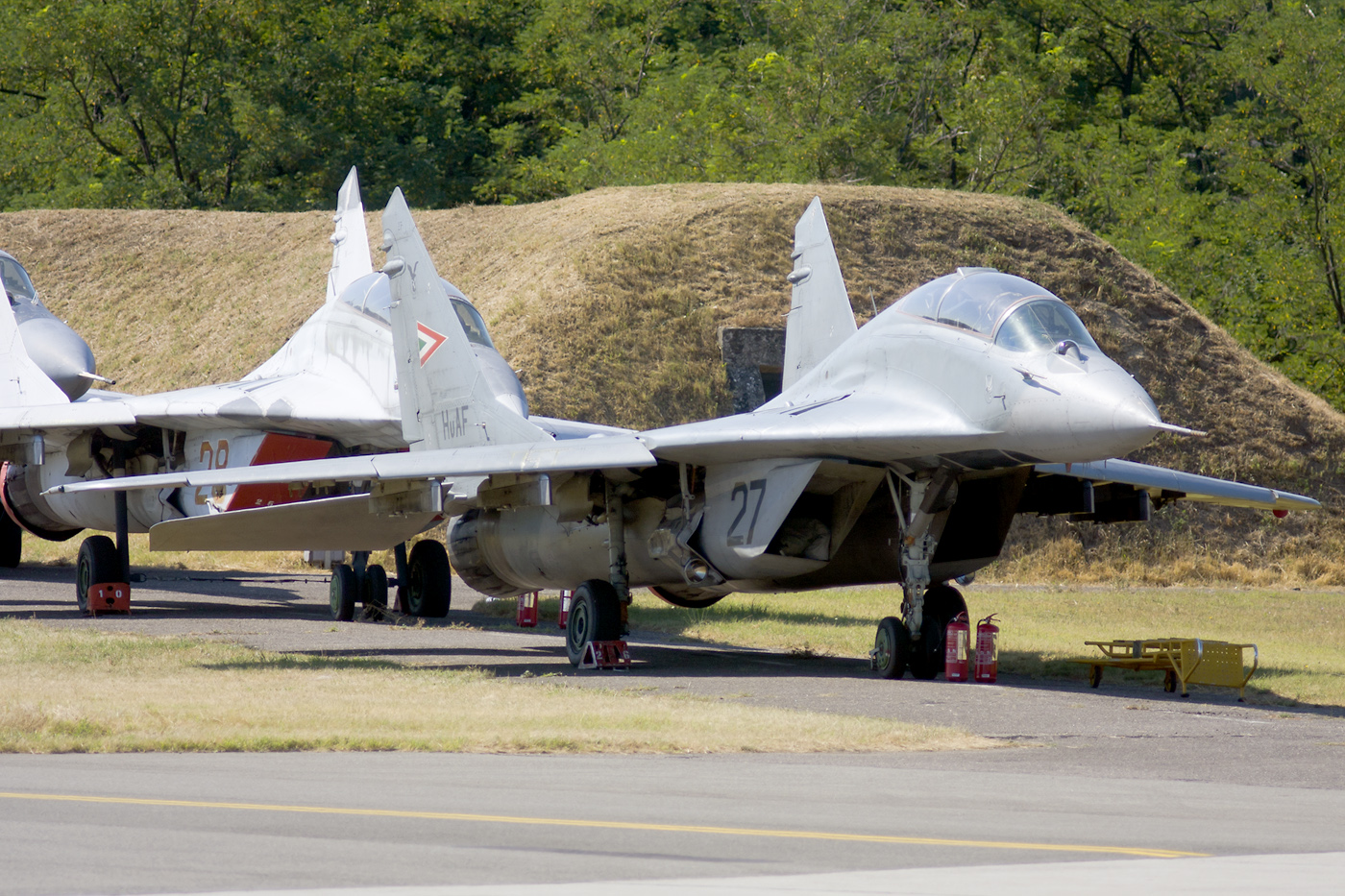
- IATA: none; ICAO: LHKE

Summary
- Airport type: Military
- Location: Kecskemét, Hungary
- Elevation AMSL: 376 ft / 115 m
- Coordinates: 46°55′03″N 019°44′57″E

Map
- Location of air base in Hungary

Runways
Direction	Length		Surface
Direction	m	ft	Surface
12/30	2,499	8,200	Concrete
- Source: DAFIF

Kecskemét Air Base (ICAO: LHKE) is a military air base located near Kecskemét, a city in Bács-Kiskun county, Hungary. The base is the venue for the Kecskemét Air Show.

== Facilities ==
The air base resides at an elevation of 376 feet (115 m) above mean sea level. It has one runway designated 12/30 with a concrete surface measuring 2,499 by 60 metres (8,199 ft × 197 ft).
