= Thunder over the Boardwalk =

Annual airshow held in Atlantic City, United States

Coordinates: 39.352601°N 74.441342°W

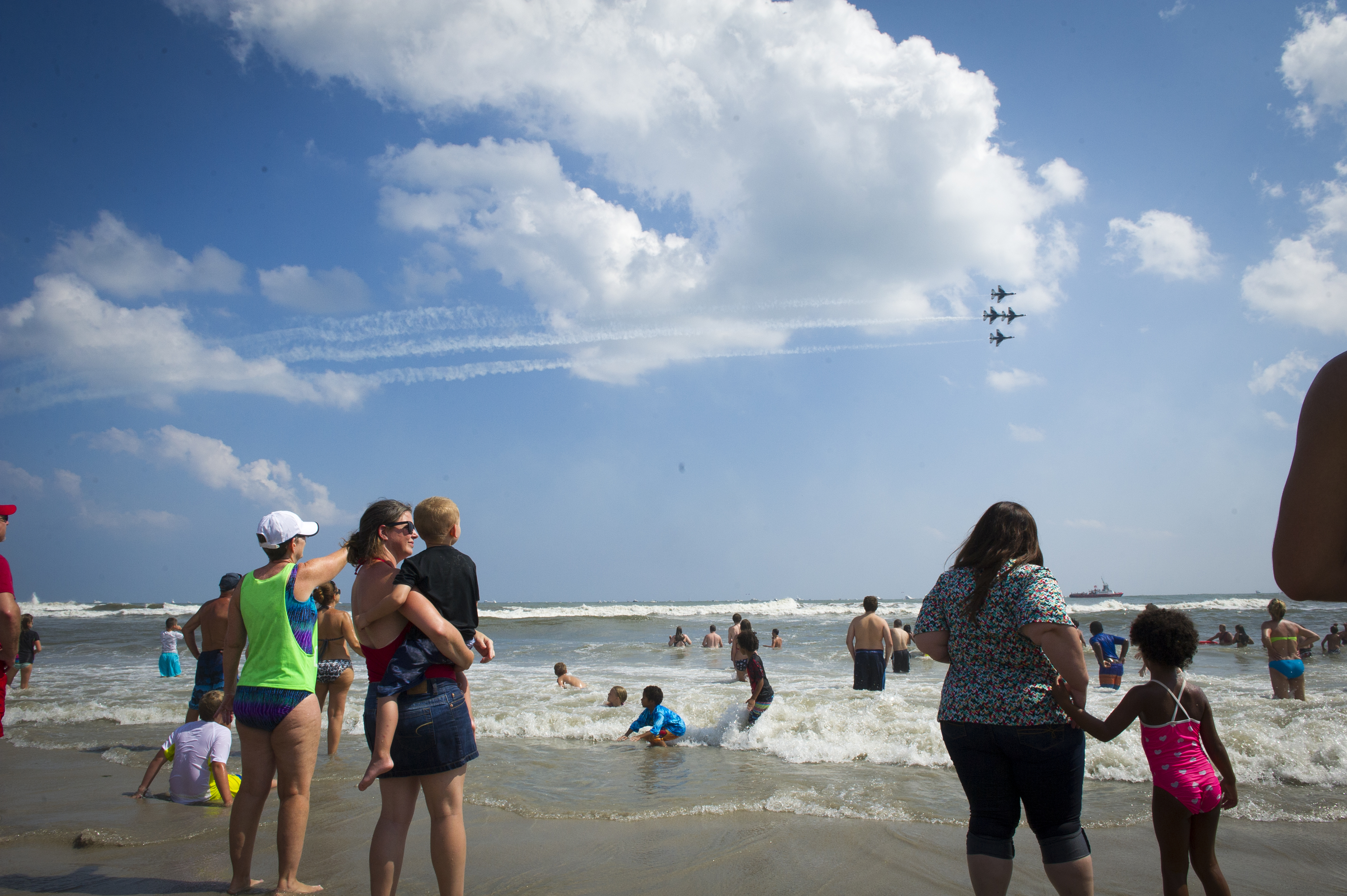
- The Thunderbirds Diamond Formation pilots performing the Trail to Diamond Bottom Up Pass on August 13, 2014.
- Status: Active
- Genre: Air show
- Dates: Varies
- Frequency: Annual
- Location: Atlantic City, New Jersey
- Country: United States
- Established: 2003
- Attendance: 750,000+ (2009)
- Major events: Aerobatic displays
- Website: Official site

Thunder Over the Boardwalk (also known as the Atlantic City Airshow) is an annual airshow held over the Atlantic City boardwalk every summer. It has occurred since 2003 and is one of the largest airshows in North America. It usually occurs on a Wednesday above the beaches of Atlantic City, New Jersey, in front of the boardwalk, with the casinos in the background. Flybys and demonstrations as high as 15,000 feet (4,600 m) and as low as 50 feet (15 m) over the water in front of the Atlantic City skyline.

It is produced by a joint venture of the Atlantic City Chamber of Commerce, the New Jersey Air National Guard's 177th Fighter Wing, The Borgata Hotel Casino & Spa, David Schultz Airshows, The Press of Atlantic City and WOND-AM. In 2020, the airshow had its first cancellation due to the COVID-19 pandemic. In 2024, the air show had its second cancellation.

== Description ==
The airshow itself primarily showcases military aviation, with demonstrations from the USAF Thunderbirds, United States Navy Blue Angels, US Army Golden Knights, as well as demonstrations from current Air Force and Navy aircraft, such as the A-10 Thunderbolt II, AV-8B Harrier, F-14 Tomcat, F-15 Eagle, F-15E Strike Eagle, F-16 Fighting Falcon, and the F/A-18F Super Hornet. Military flybys over the four years of the airshow have included the B-2 Spirit, C-5 Galaxy, C-17 Globemaster III, C-130 Hercules, C-141 Starlifter, F-22 Raptor, KC-10 Extender, KC-135 Stratotanker, and the P-3 Orion. Helicopters that have shown up over the years include the MH-60S Knighthawk, the HH-60 Jayhawk, the CH-146 Griffon, and the HH-65 Dauphin (the HH-60 and HH-65 - usually two HH-65s - perform a simultaneous search and rescue demonstration over the water).

Aerobatic performers over the years have included Kirby Chambliss, Doug Dodge, Michael Hunter, John Klatt, and Sean Tucker. The Horseman Mustang Demonstration by Jim Beasley and Ed Shipley have also appeared along with the Skytypers and the Vultures Formation Team. The FAA's William J Hughes Technical Center at Atlantic City International Airport has showcased itsConvair 440, Boeing 727-100, and Gulfstream in the show as well. The New Jersey State Police have also shown its Bell 206 and Sikorsky S-76 helicopters in the airshows.

Show center is marked in front of Boardwalk Hall (Florida Avenue) and the beach. Aircraft staging for the airshow is done at Atlantic City International Airport and at McGuire AFB, both of which are off-limits to the public.

The USAF Heritage Flight and the US Navy Legacy Flight have also performed at the show.

== Announcers ==
The announcers for the Thunder Over the Boardwalk Airshow have included Gordon Bowman-Jones (2003 and 2005), Howdy McCann (2004 and 2006) and Pinky Kravitz (2003-2014).

== Shows ==
=== 2003 ===
The first show took place on August 27, 2003, in celebration of the 100th anniversary of powered flight. Headlining the show were the Thunderbirds and the Golden Knights. The show also featured demonstrations from the A-10, F-14, F-15, and F-16, all jam packed into a five and a half hour flying display. The weather was not very favorable, as it was hazy for the entire day.

==== Performers ====
USAF Thunderbirds
US Army Golden Knights
177th Fighter Wing-F-16 Fighting Falcons (Four-Ship formation)
111th Fighter Wing-A-10 Thunderbolt II (Four-Ship formation)
118th Fighter Wing-A-10 Thunderbolt II (Two-Ship Demonstration/Flybys)
A-10 Thunderbolt II East Coast Demo Team
C-17 Globemaster III 2-Ship Flybys
C-141B Starlifter Flyby
EC-130E Command Solo Flyby
F-14 Tomcat Demonstration
F-15 Eagle East Coast Demo Team
F-16 Fighting Falcon East Coast Demo Team
HC-130J Hercules Flyby
HH-65 Dauphin 2-Ship demonstration
HU-25 Guardian Flyby
KC-10 Extender Flybys
KC-135E Stratotanker Flyby
KC-135E and 4x F-16 NJ ANG Refueling demonstration
The Horsemen - Jim Beasley and Ed Shipley
Ed Shipley F-86 Sabre Demonstration
Collings Foundation B-17G Flying Fortress flyby
USAF Heritage Flight

=== 2004 ===
The 2004 show was held on August 18, and featured the same four demonstrations, as it would be the last time an F-14 Tomcat would fly over Atlantic City, along with the last airshow appearance of a C-141B Starlifter from McGuire AFB, as the type was being withdrawn from active duty service. The skies were about the same as they were in 2003, and all of the performers were able to put on their best shows for over 350,000 airshow fans and beach-goers.

==== Performers ====
USAF Thunderbirds
US Army Golden Knights
A-10 Thunderbolt II East Coast Demo Team
C-17 Globemaster III Demonstration
F-14 Tomcat Demonstration
F-15 Eagle East Coast Demo Team
F-16 Fighting Falcon East Coast Demo Team
HH-60 Jayhawk SAR Demonstration
HH-65B Dauphin SAR Demonstration
MH-60S Knighthawk Demonstration
C-5 Galaxy Flyby
C-130E Hercules Flyby (two-ship)
C-141B Starlifter Flyby
177th Fighter Wing-F-16 Fighting Falcons (four-ship formation)
HC-130 Hercules Flyby
KC-10 Extender Flyby
KC-135E Stratotanker Flyby
KC-135E & F-16 Refueling Pass
P-3C Orion Flyby
S-3 Viking Flyby
The Starfighters
Vulture Formation Team
Jim Beasley Jr.-P-51 Mustang
FAA Tech Center Aircraft Flyby
Horizon Blue Cross Blimp
Yellow Book Pitts
USAF Heritage Flight

=== 2005 ===
The 2005 show was held on August 31, and featured the Thunderbirds once again, but the show was threatened by bad weather inland (caused by the remnants of Hurricane Katrina), which kept many of the performers from showing up, including Dale Snodgrass. High winds curtailed the Golden Knights and Black Daggers from jumping and caused sea spray coming off the ocean to ruin any chances of photographers getting decent pictures. The show was still a success, with over 200,000 people attending.

==== Performers ====
USAF Thunderbirds
US Army Golden Knights
US Army SOC Black Daggers
177th Fighter Wing-F-16 Fighting Falcons
A-10 Thunderbolt II East Coast Demo Team
AETC Flyby-Two T-1A Jayhawks and T-38 Talon
AV-8B Harrier Demonstration
C-5B Galaxy Flyby
C-130 Hercules Flyby
CH-146 Griffon Demonstration
Connecticut ANG A-10 Warthog Flyby
F-15 Eagle West Coast Demo Team
HC-130H Hercules Flyby
KC-10 Extender Flyby
KC-135E Stratotanker Flyby
KC-135E & F-16 Refueling Pass
USCG Search and Rescue Demonstration (two HH-65s)
Dale Snodgrass
Kirby Chambliss
Michael Hunter
John Klatt
NJSP S-76+ Demonstration/Flybys
Horizon Blue Cross Blimp
FAA Technical Center (Convair 580 & Boeing 727-25C Flybys)
Missing Man Formation (The Vultures)

=== 2006 ===
In December 2005, the Thunderbirds announced they were returning to Atlantic City for the fourth installment of the show. In February 2006, the Blue Angels announced they had a show site listed as "TBA" for August 23 - the same date as the Atlantic City show. In March, it was formally announced that the Blue Angels would be joining the Thunderbirds for the 2006 show.

Joining the Blues and Birds were a slew of performers making their Atlantic City debut, including Sean Tucker, the new F-15E Strike Eagle Demonstration Team, the B-2 Spirit, the F-4 Phantom, and the F-22 Raptor. The weather had turned out to be fantastic, with over 600,000 people attending the airshow, making the 2006 airshow one of the largest events ever held in Atlantic City up until that time. All of the pieces of the puzzle had fit together nicely and both jet teams held their annual reunion at Atlantic City.

==== Performers ====
USAF Thunderbirds
US Navy Blue Angels
US Army Golden Knights
177th Fighter Wing-F-16 Fighting Falcon
B-2 Spirit Flyby
C-17 Globemaster III Flyby
F-15E Strike Eagle Demo Team
F-16 Fighting Falcon East Coast Demo Team
F-22 Raptor Flybys
HH-65 Dauphin & HH-60 Jayhawk SAR Demonstration
HU-25 Guardian Flyby
KC-135E Stratotanker Flyby
KC-10 Extender Flyby
P-3C Orion Flyby
QF-4E Phantom II Demonstration/Flybys
Sean Tucker
Michael Hunter
Jim Beasley Jr.-P-51 Mustang
GEICO Sktypers
USAF Heritage Flight
FAA Tech Center (Global 5000 and Boeing 727 Flybys)
New Jersey State Police (S-76 SWAT Demo) Flybys

=== 2007 ===
==== Performers ====
USAF Thunderbirds
US Army Golden Knights
A-10 Thunderbolt II Flyby
AV-8B Harrier Demonstration
B-2 Spirit Flyby
C-5 Galaxy Flyby
C-17 Globemaster III Flyby
Ch-46 Sea Knight Flyby
EC-130J Command Solo Flyby
F-16 Fighting Falcon (Four Ship Formation)
F-16 Fighting Falcon East Coast Demonstration Team
F/A-18C Hornet Demonstration-VFA-106
KC-135E Stratotanker Flyby
USCG Search & Rescue Demonstration
Matt Chapman
Michael Mancuso
Rob Holland
Horsemen Mustang Demonstration
GEICO Skytypers
Red Stars Formation Team
USAF Heritage Flight
FAA William J Hughes Tech Center (Global 5000 Flyby)
New Jersey State Police (S-76 and Bell 206 SWAT Demonstration) Flybys
Horizon Blue Cross Blimp

=== 2008 ===
==== Performers ====
USAF Thunderbirds
US Army Golden Knights
106th Rescue Wing-HC-130P & HH-60G
177th Fighter Wing F-16 Fighting Falcons
C-17 Globemaster III Flyby-Dover AFB
C-17 Globemaster III Flyby-McGuire AFB
CH-46 Sea Knight Flyby
EC-130J Command Solo Flyby
F-15E Strike Eagle Demo Team
F-16 Fighting Falcon East Coast Demo Team
F/A-18F Super Hornet Demonstration-VFA-106
HH-65 Coast Guard Search & Rescue Demo
KC-10 Extender Flyby
KC-135 Stratotanker Flyby
MH-53E Sea Dragon Fly
Matt Chapman
Tim Weber
Greg Poe
Ed Hamill
Red Eagles
Josh Wilson-Yak-50
Jim Beasley Jr. (P-51 Demo)
Lee Lauderback (P-51 in HF)
Northeast Raiders Formation
NJ State Police Bell 206 & S-76 Flybys
FAA Tech Center DC-3, Global Express Flybys
USAF Heritage Flight
US Navy Legacy Flight

=== 2009 ===
The show was held on Wednesday, August 19. It debuted the Flightline Club which provided public seating on the beach and also featured a la carte food and beverage service. The weather had turned out to be fantastic, with over 750,000 people attending the airshow, making it one of the largest events ever held in Atlantic City. The schedule included the USAF Heritage Flight featuring the F-16, A-10 and 2 P-51s and the US Navy Legacy Flight featuring F/A-18F and F4U Corsair.

==== Performers ====
USAF Thunderbirds
US Army Golden Knights
1st Fighter Wing-F-22 Raptors (Four Ship)
106th Rescue Wing Combat Search & Rescue Demonstration
108th Air Refueling Wing-KC-135R Stratotanker
177th Fighter Wing-F-16 Fighting Falcons
NJ ANG Refueling Pass- KC-135R & F-16s
514th Air Mobility Wing-C-17 Globemaster III
514th Air Mobility Wing-KC-10 Extender
914th Airlift Wing-C-130 Hercules (two)
A-10 Thunderbolt II East Coast Demo Team
CH-46 Sea Knight (HMM-774)
E-2C Hawkeye Flyby (VAW-120)
F-16 Fighting Falcon East Coast Demo Team
F/A-18F Super Hornet Demonstration - VFA-106
USCG Search & Rescue Demonstration
Rob Holland
Tim Weber
Josh Wilson
KYW-3 Chopper 3
Red Eagle Aerobatic Team
New Jersey State Police Flybys
The Horsemen
FAA Tech Center Flybys - Global Express
US Navy Legacy Flight
USAF Heritage Flight

=== 2010 ===
The 2010 show was held on Wednesday, August 25 – 100 years after Atlantic City and Asbury Park hosted New Jersey's very first airshows. According to the New Jersey State Police there were over 750,000 people in attendance.

==== Performers ====
USAF Thunderbirds
US Army Golden Knights
Brazilian Smoke Squadron
Rob Holland MX2
USMC Harrier jump jet
Tom Duffy's B-25 Flybys
U.S. Navy F/A-18F Super Hornet
Jim Beasley Jr. P-51
USAF A-10A Thunderbolt II Demo Team
USAF F-16 Viper Demonstration Team
USCG Search & Rescue demonstration
Military Flybys (KC-135, F-16, C-17, KC-10, and many more)
FAA William J Hughes Technical Center aircraft flybys
USN E-2C Hawkeye demonstration

=== 2011 ===
The show was held on Wednesday, August 17.

==== Performers ====
USAF Thunderbirds
US Army Golden Knights Parachute Team (Flag Jump w/US National Anthem followed by Mass Show)
Canadian Skyhawks Parachute Team (Full Show w/ Canadian National Anthem)
USAF-ANG 177th FW F-16 Fighting Falcon (4-ship flyby)
USAF-ANG 108th ARW KC-135 Stratotanker
New Jersey Air National Guard (KC-135 & F-16s composite flyby)
Heavy Metal Jet Team L-39C
USAF-ANG 166th AW, C-130H Hercules (2-ship flyby)
NJ State Police Aviation Unit
MedEVAC 5 Helicopter flybys
Jim Beasley Jr. Spitfire MK18
GEICO Skytypers
USCG MH-65C Search & Rescue
USAF 514th AMW, C-17A Globemaster III
US Navy F/A-18F Super Hornet
Tom Duffy F4U Corsair
USMC HMM-774 CH-46E Seaknight
USAF-ANG 103rd RQS (HC-130 & HH-60G para-rescue demonstration)
USAF-ANG 106th RQS HC-130H Hercules
Jim Beasley P-51D Mustang
USAF A-10C Thunderbolt II
USAF Heritage Flight
GEICO SNJ-2 vs. GEICO SpeedBoat race
Heavy Metal Jet Team
Kendal Simpson Pitts Model 12

=== 2012 ===
The 2012 show was held on Friday, August 17. This was the first year the show was held on a weekend. Early attendance estimates were for 1 million people.

==== Performers ====
USAF Thunderbirds
US Army Golden Knights
7th Bomb Wing B-1B Lancer Flyby
106th Rescue Wing-HC-130H
143rd Airlift Wing-C-130J-30 Hercules
166th Airlift Wing-C-130H Hercules
177th Fighter Wing-F-16 Fighting Falcons
305th AMW/514th AMW-C-17 Globemaster III
2 QF-4E Phantom
SH-60B Seahawk
USCG Search & Rescue Demonstrations (MH-65s)
USCG HC-130J Hercules
Black Diamond Jet Team
Hawker Beechcraft Texan II
GEICO Skytypers
Northeast Raiders
Red Eagle Airsports
Andrew McKenna (T-6)
Jim Beasley Jr. (Spitfire & P-51)
USAF Heritage Flight
FAA William J Hughes Tech Center (Convair 580 & Global 5000)
New Jersey State Police (AW139, Bell 206, S-76)

=== 2013 ===
In 2013, the show returned to a Wednesday but it was held in June instead of its traditional month of August. This year, spending cuts by the United States federal government due to budget sequestration forced the US military to cancel all appearances at airshows, including this show. As a result, there were no US military flybys, jet demonstration teams, parachute teams, or solo demonstrations by select fighters. While many airshows elsewhere were canceled due to the absence of US military support, Atlantic City organizers decided the show was going to be held regardless. At the same time, they had a challenge: more commercial acts meant that organizers were looking for more donations to cover the costs of this airshow. Overall, they still managed to put on a good show even without the US military to provide the "thunder" that gave this airshow its name.

=== 2014 ===
The show returned to its traditional month of August. It was held on Wednesday, August 13. With the end of sequestration, US military participants returned to the show.

==== Performers ====
USAF Thunderbirds
US Army Golden Knights
USMC Harrier demonstration
Andrew McKenna P-51
USCG Search & Rescue
Jim Beasley Jr. Spitfire
Jason Flood Pitts S1S
Jack Kelly 1951 Bell 47 Helicopter Model D1
AtlantiCare Medical Helo
MidAtlantic MedEvac Helo
6ABC News Chopper
USMC AV-8B Harrier II
Geico Skytypers (6-ship) & Geico Speedboat race
Warrior Aviation L-39
Raiders Demonstration Team
FAA Flybys
Andrew McKenna P-51 & Jim Beasley Jr. Spitfire (2-ship routine)
Rob Holland MX-2 Aerobatics (World Unlimited Aerobatic Champion)

=== 2015 ===
The show was held on Wednesday, September 2. The Blue Angels were the first announced participant. The Star-Spangled Banner was delivered by Lee Greenwood.

==== Performers ====
USN Blue Angels
Jim Beasley III – J3 Cub
LUCAS Oil Skydivers Flag Jump
Mike Wiskus – LUCAS Oil Pitts
GEICO Skytypers
Jim Beasley Jr. – SNJ Texan
Jack Kelly – Bell 47D1 Helicopter
AtlantiCare Medical Helicopter
MidAtlantic MedEvac Helicopter
Chopper 6 (WPVI – Channel 6 ABC)
New Jersey State Police Aviation Unit
Raiders Aerobatic Demonstration Team
Jim Beasley – P-51D Mustang
USAF F-22 Raptor
USAF Heritage Flight (F-22 & P-51)
GEICO Skytypers vs. Miss GEICO Speedboat Race
Matt Chapman Embry Riddle CAP580
USCG Search & Rescue Demonstration
Mike Wiskus – LUCAS Oil Pitts
USN Blue Angels – C-130T Hercules

=== 2020 ===
The airshow was canceled for 2020 due to the COVID-19 pandemic.

=== 2022 ===
The show was held on Wednesday, August 24.

==== Performers ====
U.S. Army Golden Knights Flag Jump with National Anthem
U.S. Army Golden Knights Mass Exit Show
N.J. Air National Guard 177th FW F-16 Flyby
N.J. Air National Guard 108th WG KC-135 Flyby
NBC 10 Helicopter Flybys
N.J. Air National Guard Composite Wing Flyby (KC-135 & 2 F-16s)
Chris Thomas SNJ-2 Aerobatics
U.S. Navy MH-53 Super Stallions Flyover
U.S. Air Force C-17A Globemaster III Demonstration
Medical Helicopter Flybys
N.J. State Police Flybys
552nd Air Control Wing E-3C Sentry Flyby
N.J. Air National Guard UH-60 SPIES/FRIES Demonstration
552nd Air Command Wing E-3C Sentry Flyby
1st HS, UH-1N Twin Huey (2-ship) Flyby
FAA William J. Hughes Aircraft Flybys (2-passes)
Jim Beasley Jr./Ed Shipley Ti-6 (2-ship) Demo
U.S. Coast Guard Search & Rescue Demonstration
Paul Dougherty Eagle Aerobatics
Full Throttle Formation Team
Army Golden Knights Parachute Demonstration
Jim Beasley Jr. P-51 Mustang Demonstration
U.S. Navy F/A-18 Super Hornet Demonstration
U.S. Navy Legacy Flight F/A-18 & FG-1D Corsair
U.S. Air Force Thunderbirds Enlistment Ceremony
U.S. Air Force Thunderbirds

=== 2024 ===
For the second time in its history, the Atlantic City Airshow was canceled for 2024. First, in the spring of 2024, there had been some skepticism regarding sources of funding to make the air show possible. When the air show's future was up in the air, Gov. Phil Murphy's office said the South Jersey Transportation Authority would give $300,000 to fund the event. Then, came word that the US Air Force Thunderbirds would no longer be supporting weekday air shows due to logistical challenges of having to squeeze in a midweek airshow with an airshow either the previous weekend or a week or so afterwards: along with the Blue Angels announcing they didn't even have Atlantic City on their schedule. The tipping point came on July 10th, when the act that was supposed to fill the shoes of the Thunderbirds announced they couldn't make it.

== See also ==
- List of air shows
