= Miramar Air Show =

San Diego air show

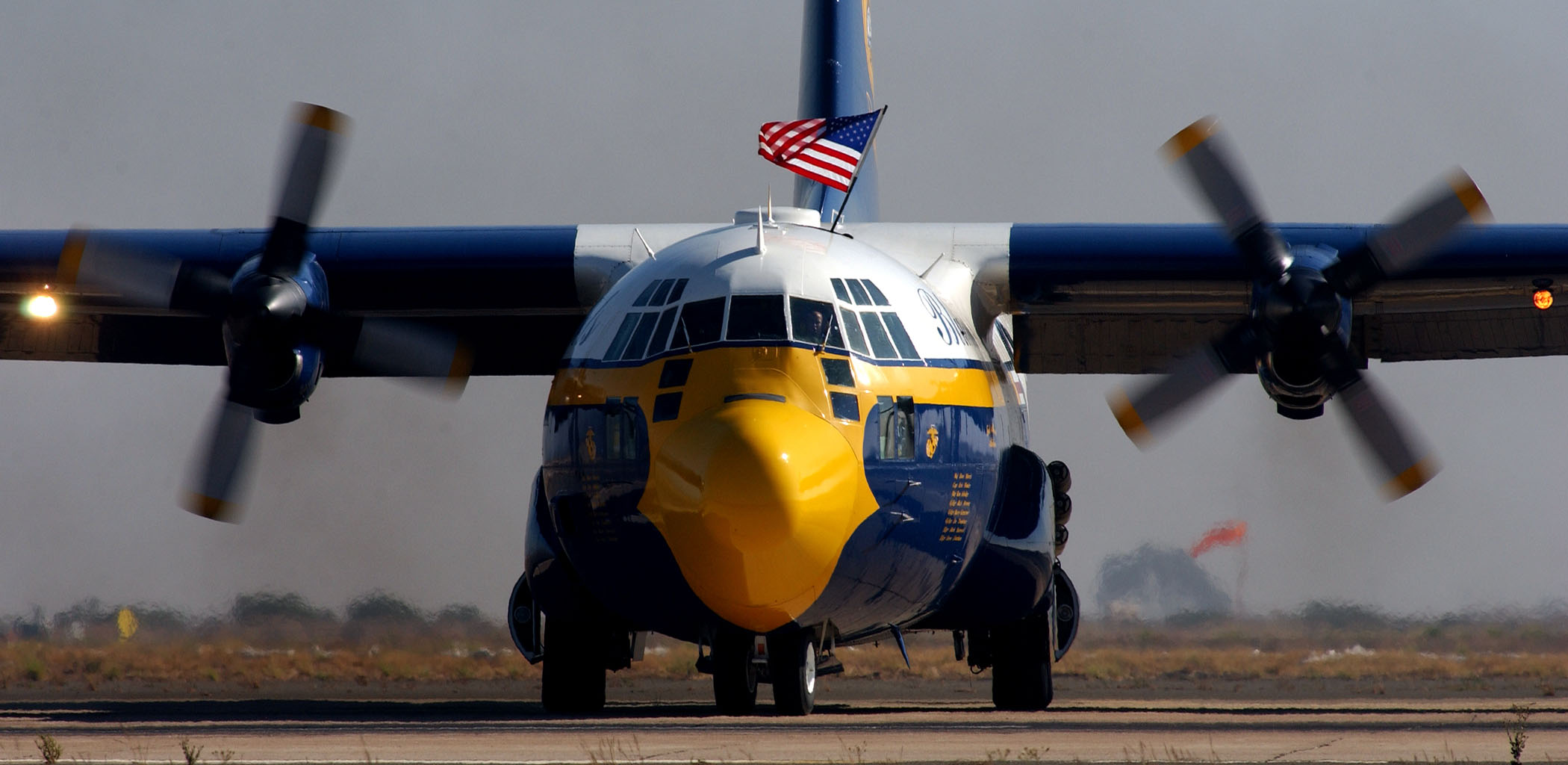
- Blue Angels' "Fat Albert" C-130
- Frequency: Annually
- Venue: Marine Corps Air Station Miramar
- Locations: San Diego, California
- Coordinates: 32°52′04″N 117°08′30″W
- Country: United States
- Inaugurated: 1953
- Most recent: 2026
- Next event: 2027
- Attendance: c. 700,000
- Major events: Military and civilian aerobatic displays
- Website: www.miramarairshow.com

The Miramar Air Show is an annual air show in San Diego, California, held at Marine Corps Air Station Miramar. The three-day event is the largest military air show in the United States, with total annual attendance estimated at 700,000. In 2007, it was voted the "World's Best Military Air Show" by the International Council of Air Shows, the first time the award was given to a Marine Corps air station since 1994.

The show's daily performance schedule includes military and civilian aircraft, usually highlighted by the Blue Angels, and is largely the same for all three days, with an extra "twilight show" on Saturday night only. Mornings are largely taken up by civilian performers. The Saturday twilight show includes military and civilian performers, a fireworks display, and the detonation of the "Great Wall of Fire" pyrotechnic display.

The show includes a large selection of "static" (non-flying) displays representing aircraft from the U.S. Navy, U.S. Army, U.S. Air Force, and the United States Marine Corps, as well as civilian and historic military aircraft. Numerous commercial vendors, United States Armed Forces recruiting displays, area law enforcement recruiters, civilian flight organizations and a business and franchise fair are also on site.

== Static Displays ==
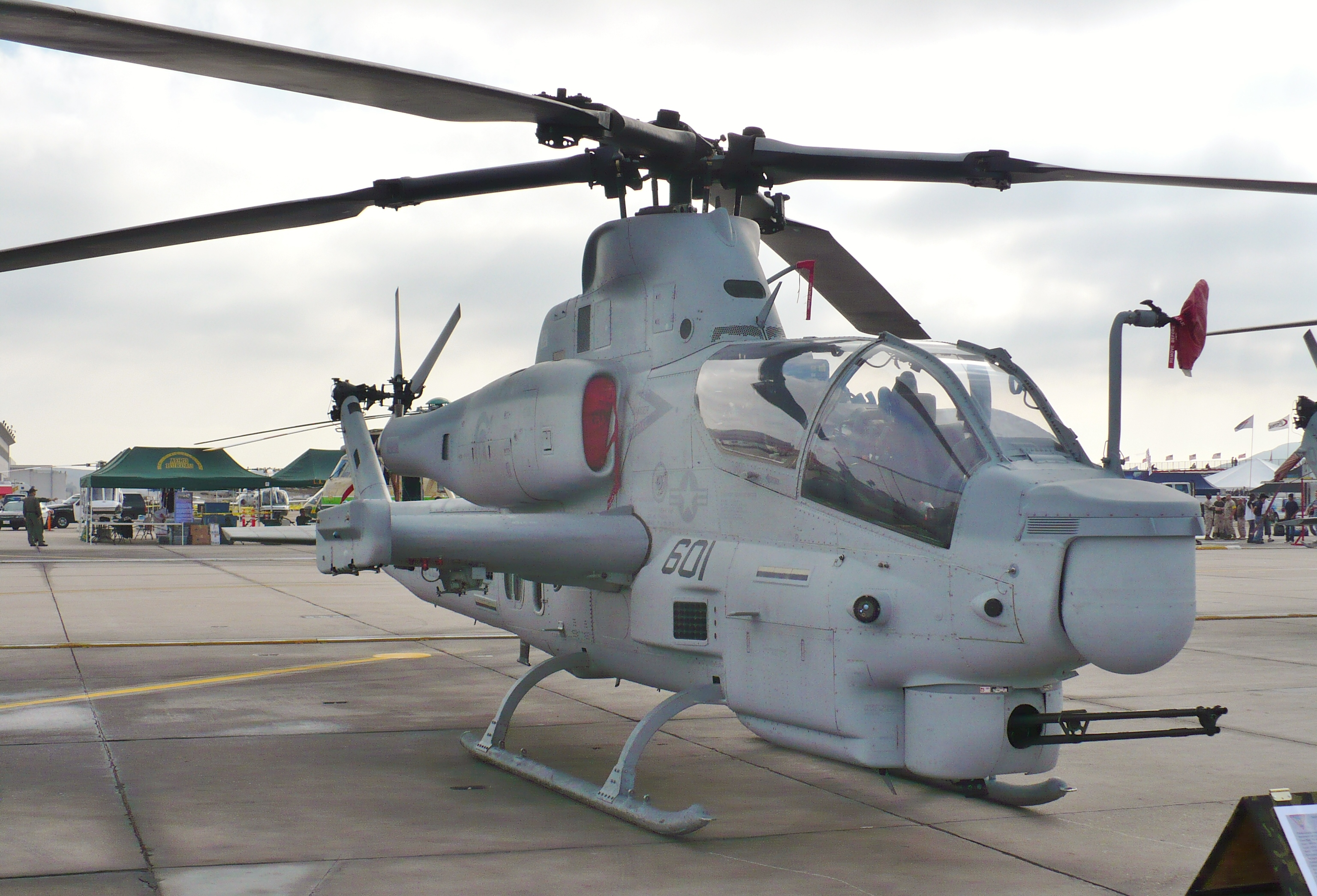
AH-1Z Cobra helicopter gunship on static display.

The show features more than 100 military and civilian aircraft on static display. The particular aircraft on hand changes each year depending on availability. Most aircraft can be toured by visitors, with active-duty service personnel on hand to answer questions. The displays are informally grouped into areas representing:

- USAF transport planes and bombers such as the C-5 Galaxy, C-17 Globemaster III, KC-135 Stratotanker, C-130 Hercules and B-52 Stratofortress, as well as fighter aircraft such as the F-16 Fighting Falcon, F-15 Eagle and F-22 Raptor, and other support and training aircraft;
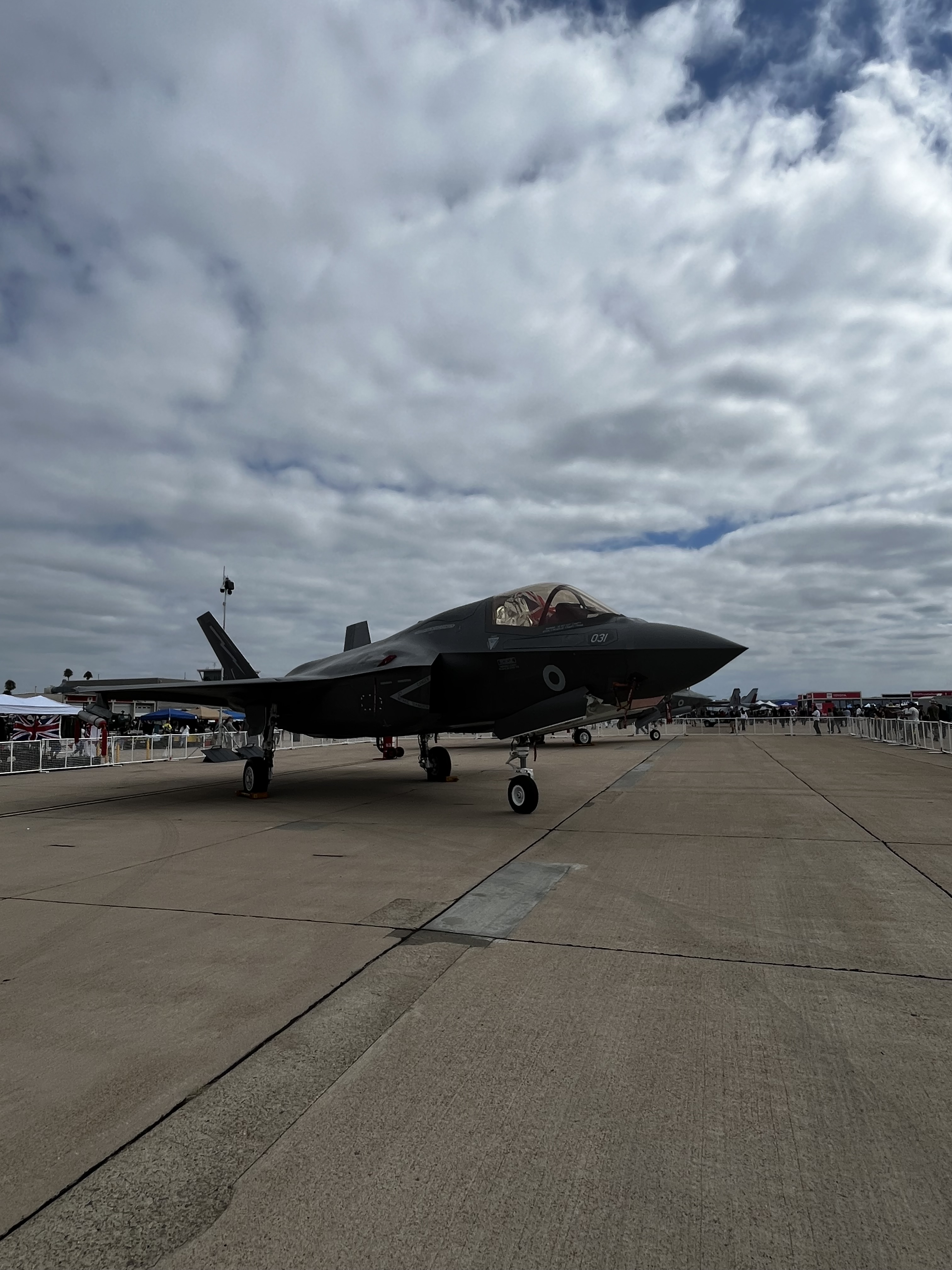
- F-35B of the RAF at Miramar 2025.
  "Squadron Row," an area of booths staffed by units based at Miramar and Marine Corps Base Camp Pendleton, as well as other Marine Corps bases, to meet the public and sell merchandise to support squadron activities, and to display squadron aircraft including fixed-wing (F/A-18 Hornet and AV-8B Harrier) and rotor wing (AH-1 Cobra, MV-22 Osprey, and CH-53 Sea Stallion) aircraft;
- The MAGTF area with rotor wing and tiltrotor aircraft representing units based at Miramar and nearby Camp Pendleton, and infantry units from Pendleton and other installations demonstrating M1 Abrams tanks, LAV-25 Light Armored Vehicles, support vehicles, artillery systems and infantry weapons;
- A "War Birds" area representing World War II-era aircraft, aircraft from the Korean War and Vietnam War era, and aircraft from foreign countries;
- Recruiting and informational displays by most branches of the U.S. armed forces, area law enforcement agencies, the Border Patrol, the Civil Air Patrol, and other civilian organizations.

== Aerial Performers ==
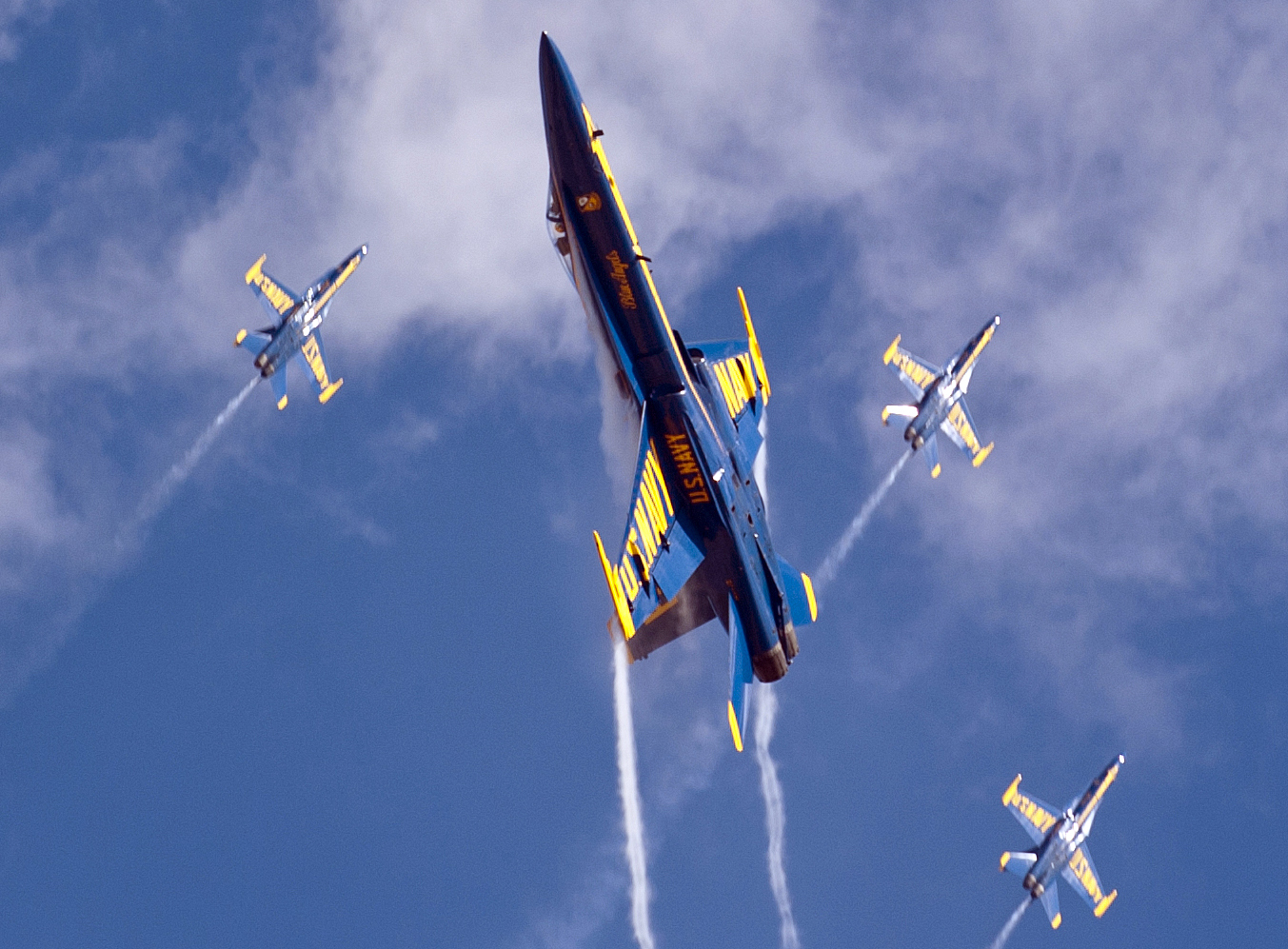
The U.S. Navy Blue Angels perform at the Miramar Air Show

Most years the performance schedule is highlighted by the Blue Angels, who perform each day of the show. In 2007 the USAF Thunderbirds performed at the show (the two teams very rarely perform together ). These performances mark the end of each day's aerial performance schedule, except for the Saturday twilight show.

Separately, the Navy's F/A-18E Super Hornet and USMC AV-8B Harrier usually fly individual demonstrations. The MV-22 Osprey has also been featured since the 2011 show. In 2014, the Marine Corps F-35B Lightning II flew for the first time at the show.

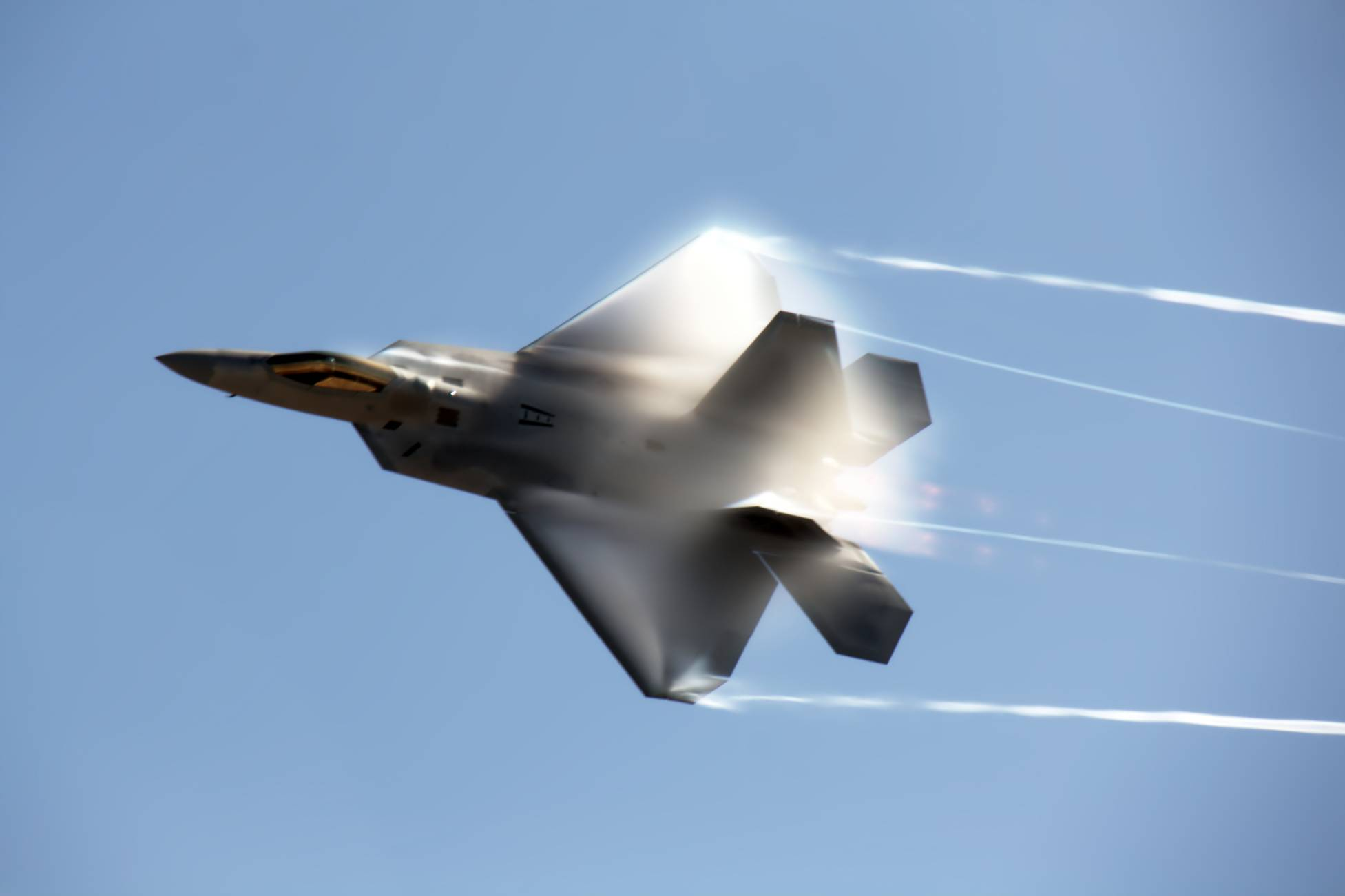
F-22 flying at the 2008 Miramar Air Show.

Though focused on Marine Corps and Navy assets, the show also regularly includes USAF aircraft, including the F-22 Raptor and other fighter aircraft when available.

The U.S. Army Golden Knights Parachute Team frequently performs, and often jumps during the twilight show. Since 1999, the show has often featured a Navy Legacy Flight, where modern jets fly in formation with aircraft from previous eras in celebration of military veterans and naval aviation history.

The show also attracts a number of civilian performers from the U.S. air show circuit, flying prop planes, jet aircraft and gliders. Frequent performers include Sean Tucker's Oracle Challenger, the Red Bull Helicopter (a modified Messerschmitt-Bölkow Blohm BO-105 capable of aerobatic maneuvers), and the Shockwave jet truck, which also perform during the twilight show. There is also a selection of radio-controlled planes.

== MAGTF Demo ==
Marines tactically disembark from a MV-22B Osprey during the 2026 MAGTF demo

A major element of each year's show is the MAGTF Demo, a simulated assault by numerous Marine Corps units that demonstrates the air, ground and logistical elements of the Marine Air Ground Task Force.

The demonstration is performed each day of the show and features an array of fixed-wing, helicopter and tilt-rotor aircraft—F/A-18 Hornet and AV-8B Harrier jets, CH-53E Super Stallion, AH-1 Cobra and UH-1Y Venom helicopters, the MV-22 Osprey, and KC-130 Hercules tankers—all in the air simultaneously.

The Hornet and Harrier jets take turns flying simulated attack runs and demonstrate mid-air refueling with the KC-130. The MV-22 Ospreys deliver Marine Corps ground troops to the airfield, while the Cobra gunships simulate attack and air cover roles. (The MV-22 Osprey tilt-rotor aircraft joined the MAGTF demo in 2010 and replaced the CH-46 Sea Knight entirely in 2014 as the aircraft was phased out of the Marine Corps inventory.) The UH-1 delivers a team of Marine infantry via a fast-rope insertion, where they simulate calling in a naval artillery barrage, then retrieves them in a Special Patrol Insertion/Extraction maneuver.

The MAGTF ground element advances on the gathered crowds.

On the ground, Marine infantry simulate an advance on an enemy position, joined by M-1 Abrams tanks, Light Armored Vehicles and Humvees. Throughout the demonstration the attacks are punctuated by controlled pyrotechnic explosions, culminating in a "wall of fire" detonation. An air and ground review concludes each performance.

== History ==
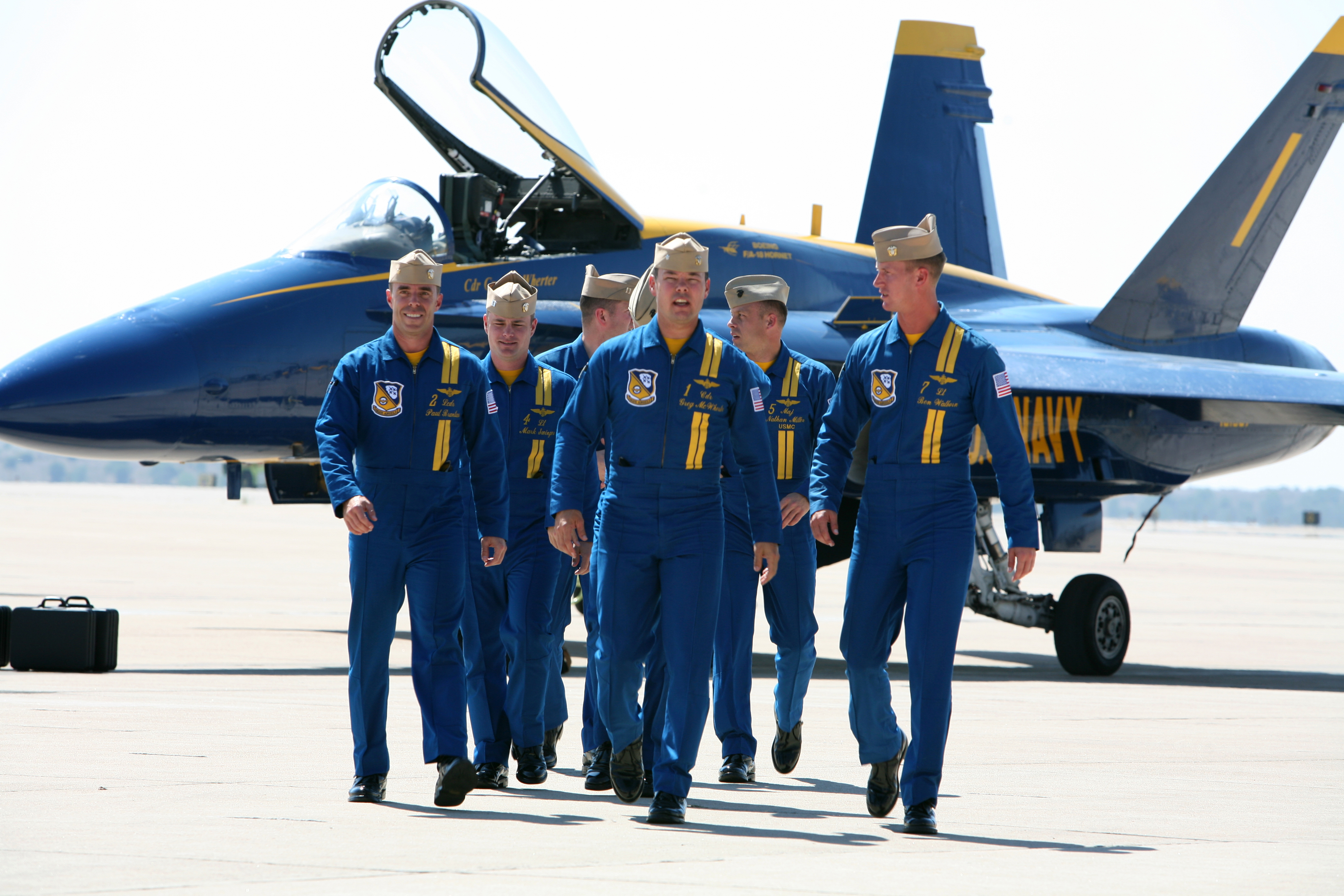
Pilots at the Miramar Air Show include elite military aviators from teams like the Blue Angels, flying F/A-18 Hornets

Prior to 1998, the Miramar installation was operated by the U.S. Navy as Naval Air Station Miramar, and the Navy produced the Miramar Air Show. The Marine Corps aircraft squadrons based in the region at that time, and since shortly after WWII, were located at Marine Corps Air Station Tustin and Marine Corps Air Station El Toro in Orange County, where the Marines had produced their own annual air show since 1950.

In 1993, the Base Realignment and Closure Commission announced that MCAS El Toro and MCAS Tustin would be closed and the Miramar facility transferred to the Marine Corps. The final Marine Corps air show at El Toro was held in 1997, drawing two million visitors; the final Navy-produced Miramar Air Show was held later the same year. In 1998, the Marine Corps took over production of the show at Miramar.

The 2011 show was the 56th edition of the event, and celebrated the 100th anniversary of naval aviation.

The 2013 edition of the show was cancelled the day before it was scheduled to begin as a result of federal budget battles. The full three-day show resumed in 2014.

The 2020 and 2021 Air Shows were canceled due to public health concerns associated with the COVID-19 outbreak.

The 2026 show occurred under the name America's Air Show, as part of the celebrations of the United States Semiquincentennial. Some of the aircraft on display were fenced off due to damage to aircraft occurring during the 2025 show.

== See also ==
- Marine Corps Air Station Miramar
- United States Marine Corps Aviation
- Active United States Marine Corps aircraft squadrons
