= List of air shows in Australia =

This is a list of air shows in Australia.

== Canberra ==
- ADFA open days feature military flyovers and the Roulettes.
- Anzac Day and other special occasions feature flyovers in Canberra.
- Skyfire is primarily a fireworks show but may feature aircraft.
- Summernats has 'skids in the air' aerobatic stunts flying.

== New South Wales ==
- Airshows Downunder Shellharbour (formerly: Wings over Illawarra), (Illawarra)
- Warbirds Down Under Airshow, Temora

== Queensland ==
- Bundaberg Air show 2009
- Pacific Airshow Gold Coast

== South Australia ==
- Jamestown Airshow (annually)
- Edinburgh Airshow

== Victoria ==
- Australian International Airshow (Avalon Airport) (Biennial)
- Gathering of the Moths at Mount Beauty Airport.
- Kyneton Air Show (Kyneton)
- Lilydale Air Show
- Tyabb Air Show (Biennial)
- ANZAC Weekend Airshow (West Sale Airport) (Biennial)
