= Danish Air Show =

Aircraft exhibition in Denmark

- Genre: Air show
- Country: Denmark
- Attendance: 80,000 to 100,000 (150,000 in 2016)
- Organizer: Royal Danish Air Force
- Website: www.danishairshow.dk

The Royal Danish Air Force conducts the annual Danish Air Show at one of its three air bases (AB), Aalborg Air Base, Air Base Karup or Air Base Skrydstrup. In 2005 Karup AB, in 2006 Skrydstrup AB in 2007 Aalborg AB and in 2008 Karup AB. No airshow was held in 2009. The Danish Air Show 2010 was again held at Skrydstrup AB. In 2012 it took place at Aalborg AB.

Currently the air show is held at the civilian Roskilde Airport in the vicinity of the Danish capitol in odd years - and at an air base in even years.

Between 80,000 and 100,000 spectators visit the show, where various military and civilian aircraft perform flying display and static display, furthermore there is a number of exhibitions of Danish military units and various civilian companies with relation to aviation. In 2016 the show beat both national and international records, when more than 150,000 spectators visits Skrydstrup AB.

The 2018 Air Show took place at Aalborg AB.

The 2020 Air Show was first postponed to 2021 and later completely cancelled. (The Air Show at Roskilde Airport scheduled for 2021 was cancelled, too.)

The 2022 Air Show took place at Karup AB.

The 2024 Air Show is announced to take place at Aalborg AB.
