= Milwaukee Air and Water Show =

Air show

Milwaukee Air & Water Show
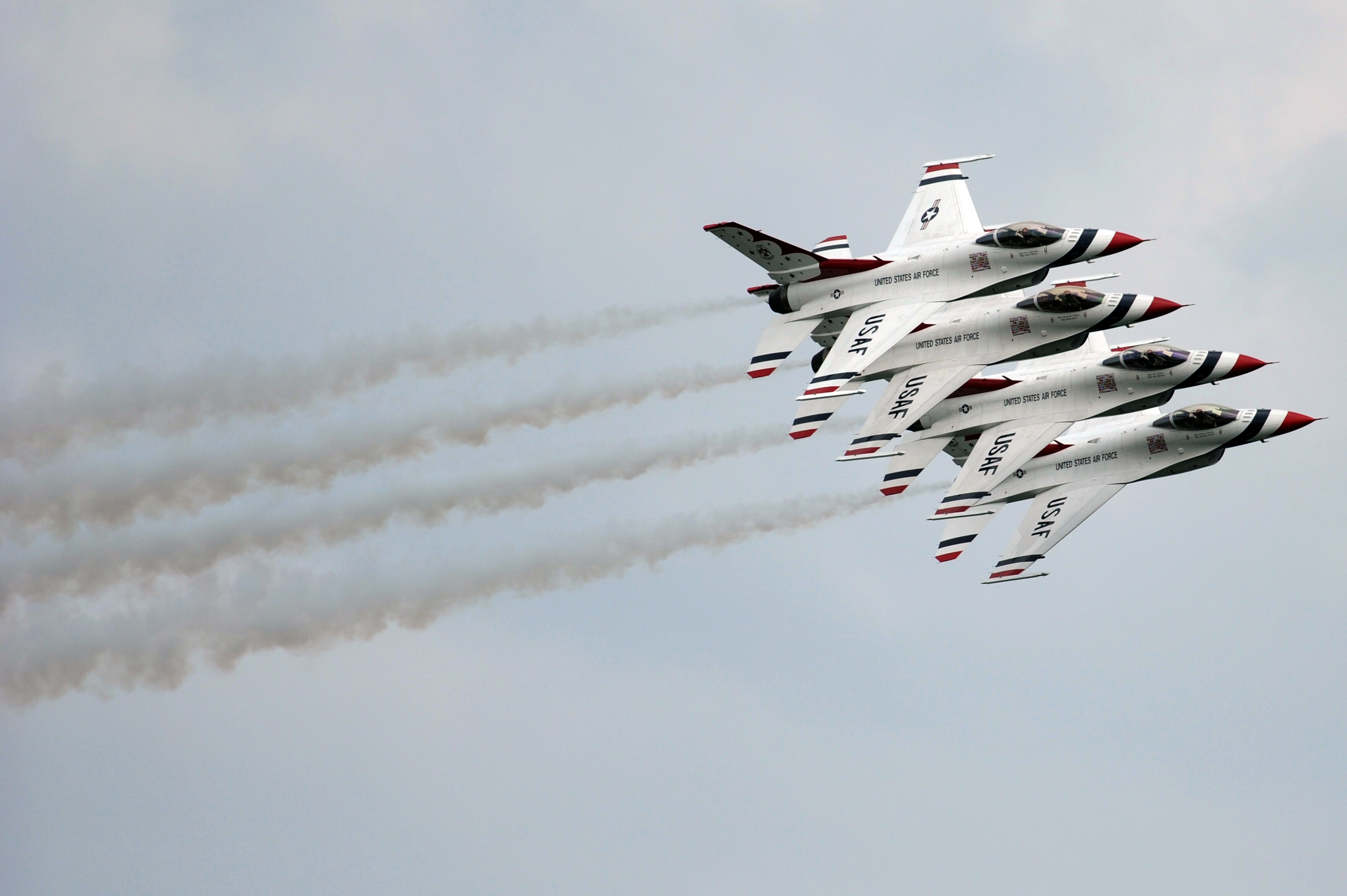
- Genre: Air show
- Location: Milwaukee, Wisconsin
- Country: U.S.A.
- Established: 2004
- Attendance: ~1,000,000 (2012)
- Website: mkeairwatershow.com

The Milwaukee Air & Water Show is an air show held on the shores of Lake Michigan in Milwaukee, Wisconsin, in the United States. It is billed as "the largest two-day event in Wisconsin", with an attendance of almost 1,000,000 people in 2012.

== History ==
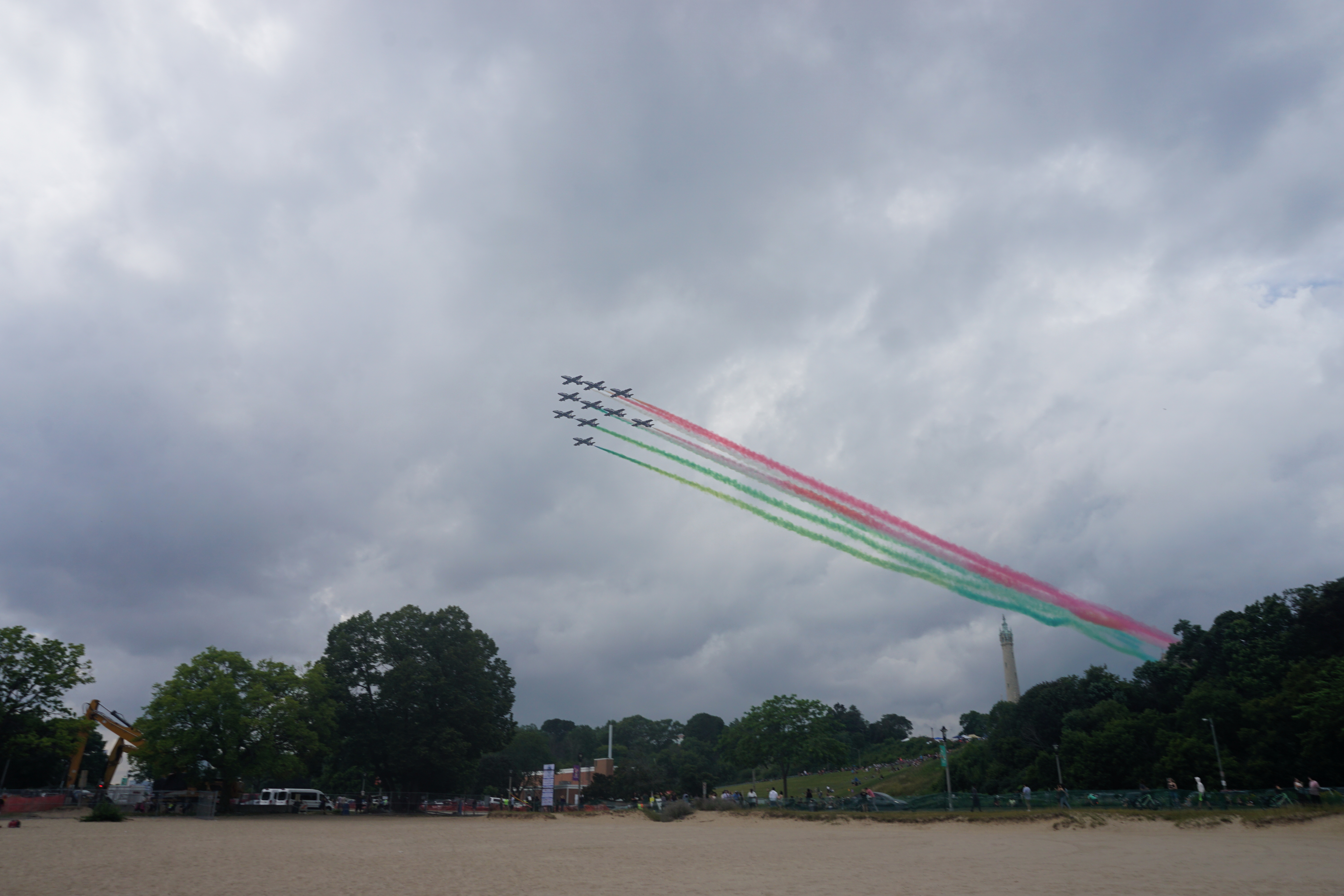
Italian Air Force Frecce Tricolori at the 2024 Milwaukee Air and Water Show

A predecessor to the airshow was first held at Festa Italiana in 2002 to celebrate its 25th anniversary. In 2004, TCF Financial Corporation joined as the title sponsor and the Milwaukee Air & Water Show staged its first event at Veterans Park. In 2005, the Navy's Blue Angels returned to Milwaukee after six years and in 2006, the Air Force's Thunderbirds performed. The Blue Angels returned in 2010 and 2017. The show featured many of the aviation industry's top acrobatic performers, including the U.S. Army's Golden Knights parachuting team and the Red Baron Pizza stunt flying team.

After a successful return of the air show and the USAF Thunderbirds in 2009, The air and water show continues under the leadership of President Paul A. Rogers, and Air Show Director Rudy Malnati. Mr. Malnati was also involved in the first air show in Milwaukee at General Mitchell Field in the 1970s, when the event was known as the "Berndt Buick Milwaukee Air Show". Lee Berndt, owner of the Buick dealership in Milwaukee, started the event, and also organized the first ICAS (International Council of Air shows) meeting in his garage in Milwaukee. ICAS is now the leading support organization for the air show industry.

The Blue Angels performed in 2010 and the Air Force Thunderbirds in 2011. In 2012 the show featured the F22 Raptor and the MV-22 Osprey "Tilt-Rotor" Demo Team.

The show took a hiatus from 2020 to 2021 and resumed in 2022.

== See also ==
- EAA AirVenture Oshkosh
- Chicago Air & Water Show
