= Kecskemét Air Show =

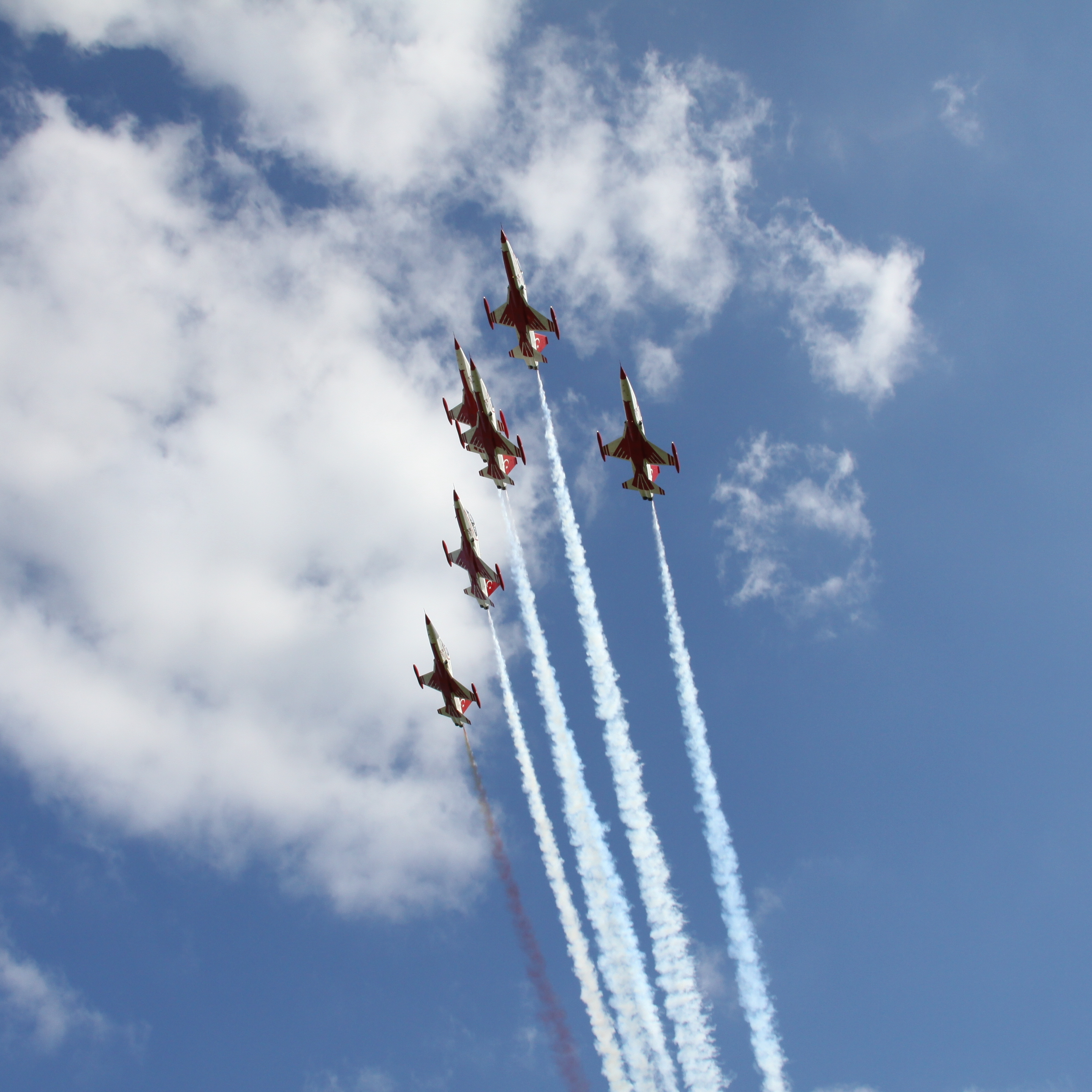
- The Turkish Stars at the Air Show in 2010
- Genre: Air show
- Venue: Kecskemét Air Base
- Location: Kecskemét
- Country: Hungary
- Established: 1990

The Kecskemét International Air Show is a two-day-long air show held since the early 1990s at the Kecskemét Air Base of the Hungarian Defence Force. In 2008, when the annual Royal International Air Tattoo was cancelled, the Kecskemét Air Show became that year's biggest air show held in Europe. It was last held in August 2021.
