= Serbian Air Show =

Serbian Air Show Batajnica Air Show
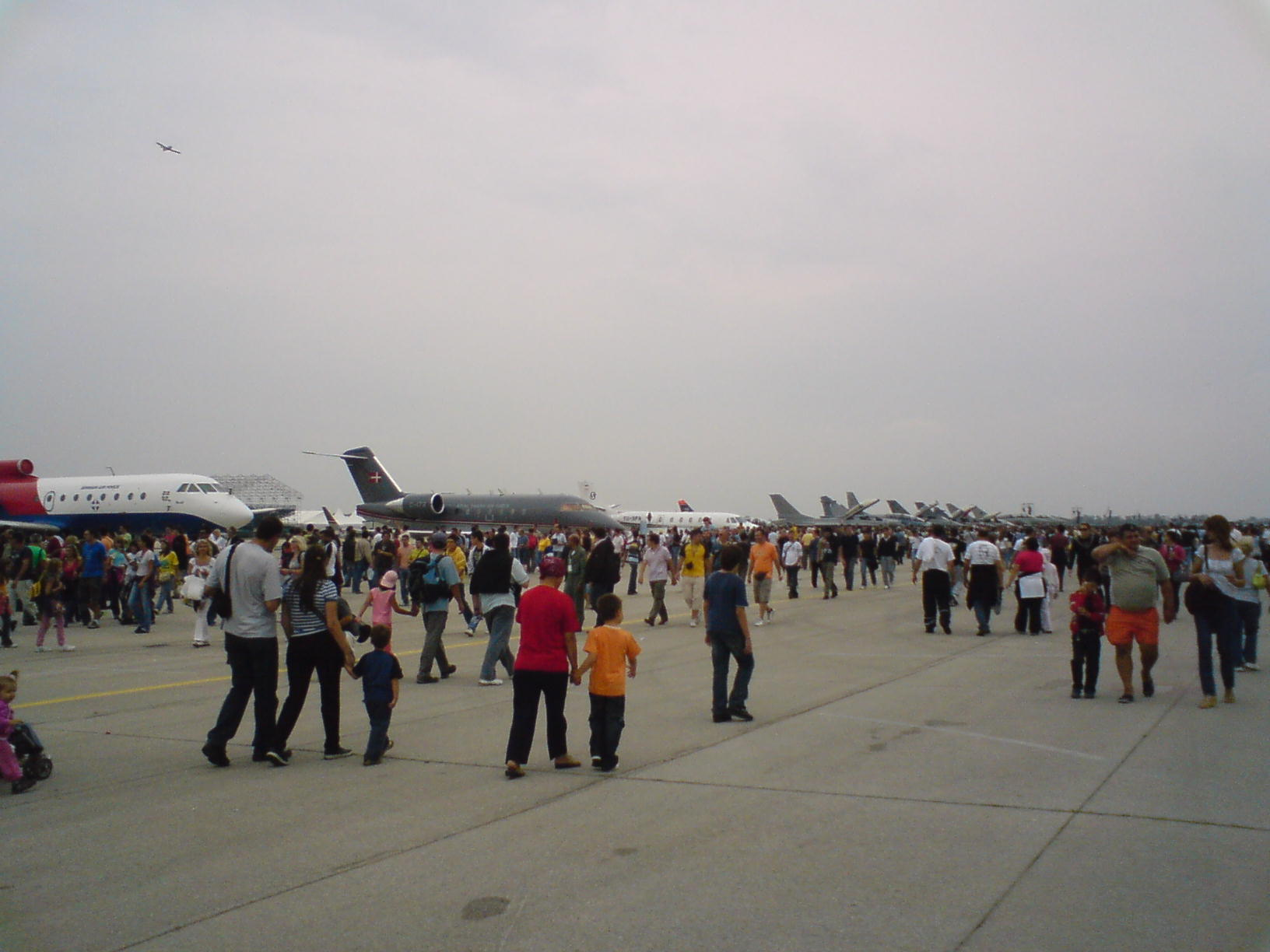
- Batajnica Air Show 2009
- Genre: Military air show
- Frequency: Annual
- Venue: Batajnica Air Base
- Location: Belgrade
- Coordinates: 44.935278°N 20.2575°E
- Country: Serbia
- Attendance: 100,000 (2009)
- Major events: Aerobatic displays Static displays
- Organizer: Serbian Air Force
- Website: www.aeromiting.vs.rs

The Batajnica Air Show or the Serbian Air Show is an annual international airshow hosted at the Batajnica Air Base, Serbia, conducted and exhibitioned by the Serbian Air Force and international participants.

== 2009 Air Show ==
200 participants from 15 countries took part including:

- Austria
- Czech Republic
- Denmark
- France
- Greece
- Hungary
- Italy
- Romania
- Serbia (host)
- Slovenia
- Spain
- Turkey
- United Kingdom
- United States

Over 100,000 spectators attended the 2009 show.

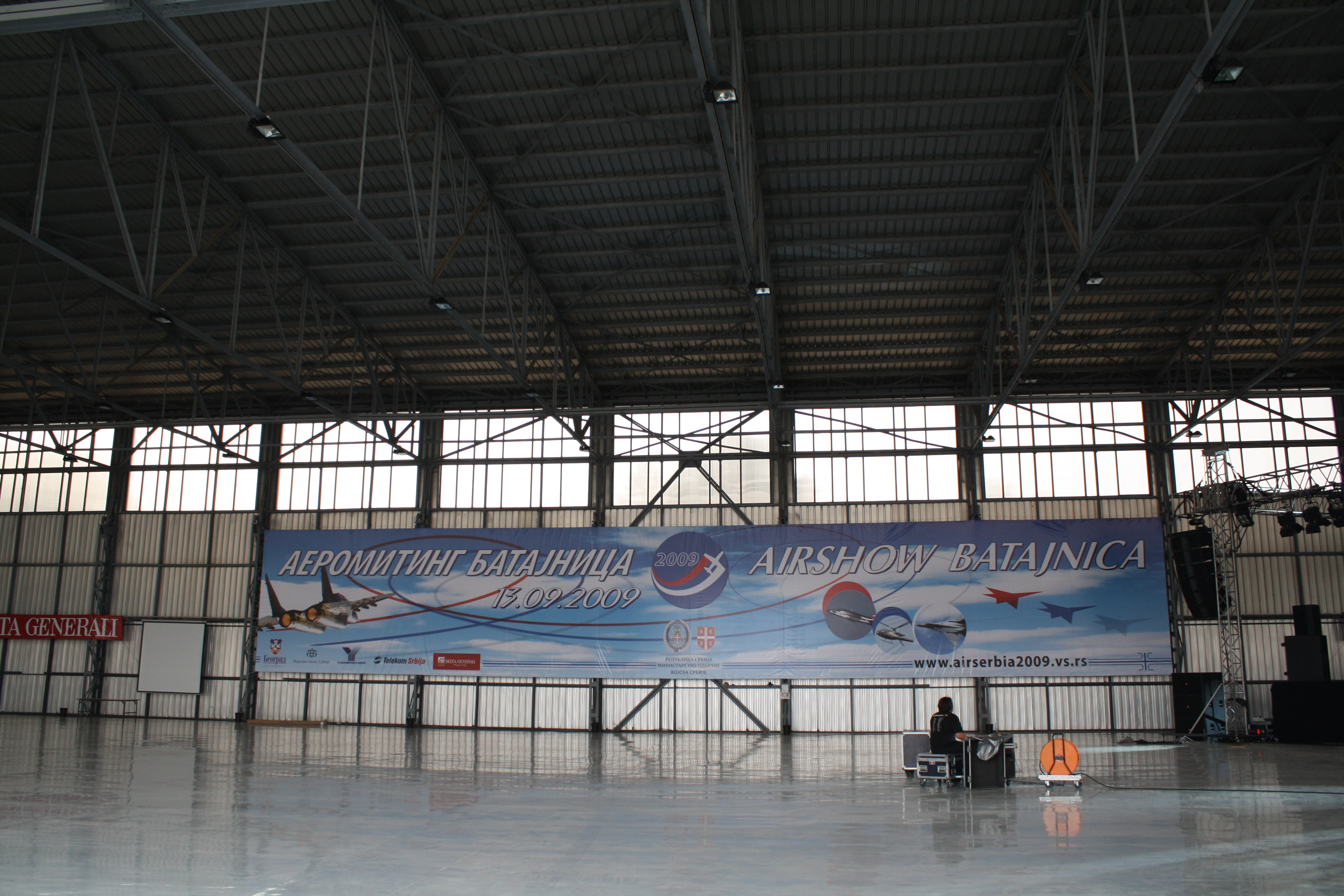
Hangar at Batajnica Air Base featuring air show banner

=== Aircraft ===
Over 40 aircraft, and 16 different types participated in the air show:

- Aérospatiale Alouette III
- Aérospatiale Gazelle
- Alpha Jet
- Antonov An-2
- Antonov An-26
- Eurofighter Typhoon
- General Dynamics F-16 Fighting Falcon
- Lasta 95
- Pilatus PC9
- Saab JAS 39 Gripen
- Soko J-22 Orao
- Soko G-4 Super Galeb
- MiG-21
- MiG-29
- Mil Mi-17
- Mil Mi-24
- Utva 75
