= Saiguède =

- Commune
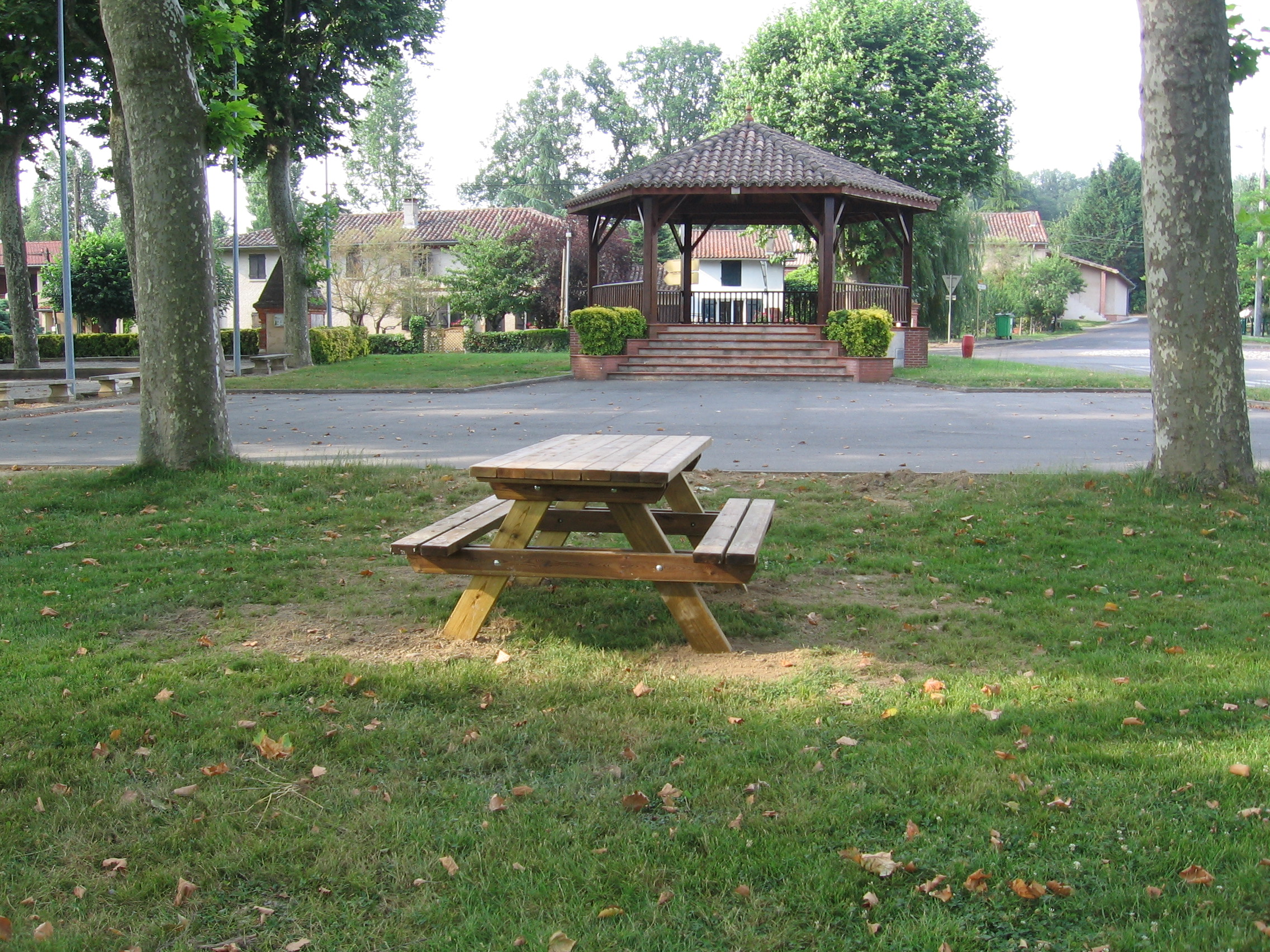
- The bandstand in Saiguède

- Coat of arms
- Location of Saiguède
- Location within France Location within Occitanie
- Coordinates: 43°31′48″N 1°08′41″E
- Country: France
- Region: Occitania
- Department: Haute-Garonne
- Arrondissement: Muret
- Canton: Plaisance-du-Touch
- Intercommunality: Le Muretain Agglo

Government
  - Mayor (2020–2026): Catherine Cambefort
- Area^{1}: 11.86 km^{2} (4.58 sq mi)
- Elevation: 225 m (738 ft)
- Highest elevation: 312 m (1,024 ft)
- Lowest elevation: 208 m (682 ft)
- Population (2023): 794
  - Density: 66.9/km^{2} (173/sq mi)
- Time zone: UTC+01:00 (CET)
  - Summer (DST): UTC+02:00 (CEST)
- INSEE/Postal code: 31466 /31470
- ^{1} French Land Register data, which excludes lakes, ponds, glaciers > 1 km^{2} (0.386 sq mi or 247 acres) and river estuaries.

Saiguède (French pronunciation: [sɛɡɛd]; Occitan: Següeda) is a commune in the Haute-Garonne department in southwestern France, near the small town of Saint-Lys, and approximately 30 km west of Toulouse.

== Geography ==
The commune is bordered by five other communes: Bonrepos-sur-Aussonnelle to the north, Fontenilles to the northeast, Saint-Lys to the east, Sainte-Foy-de-Peyrolières to the south, and finally by Saint-Thomas to the west.

== Features ==
Saiguède has a central public area, featuring a small school, teaching ages up to 11 years, a pétanque square, and a small sports court. There is also a pavilion (kiosque).

== Population ==
Historical population
Year	Pop.	±% p.a.
1968	193	—
1975	204	+0.79%
1982	361	+8.50%
1990	445	+2.65%
1999	524	+1.83%
2007	687	+3.44%
2012	785	+2.70%
2017	790	+0.13%
2023	794	+0.08%
Source: INSEE

The inhabitants of Saiguède are known as Saiguediens in French.

== See also ==
- Communes of the Haute-Garonne department
