= Lavernose-Lacasse =

- Commune
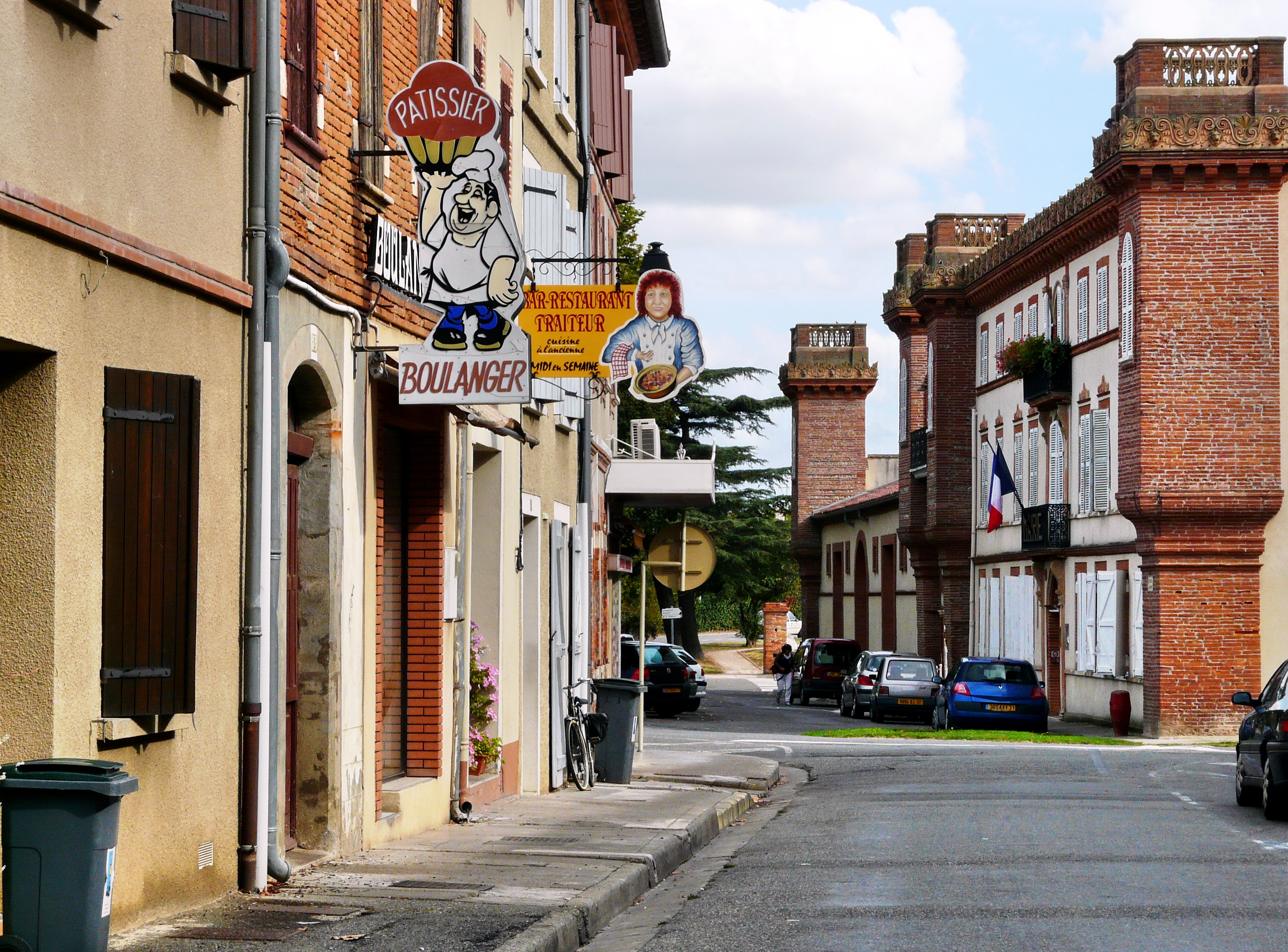
- Town hall

- Coat of arms
- Location of Lavernose-Lacasse
- Location within France Location within Occitanie
- Coordinates: 43°23′49″N 1°15′39″E
- Country: France
- Region: Occitania
- Department: Haute-Garonne
- Arrondissement: Muret
- Canton: Muret
- Intercommunality: Le Muretain Agglo

Government
  - Mayor (2020–2026): Alain Delsol
- Area^{1}: 17.83 km^{2} (6.88 sq mi)
- Elevation: 198 m (650 ft)
- Highest elevation: 210 m (690 ft)
- Lowest elevation: 181 m (594 ft)
- Population (2023): 3,798
  - Density: 213.0/km^{2} (551.7/sq mi)
- Time zone: UTC+01:00 (CET)
  - Summer (DST): UTC+02:00 (CEST)
- INSEE/Postal code: 31287 /31410
- ^{1} French Land Register data, which excludes lakes, ponds, glaciers > 1 km^{2} (0.386 sq mi or 247 acres) and river estuaries.

Lavernose-Lacasse (French pronunciation: [lavɛʁnoz lakas]; Occitan: La Vernosa e La Caça) is a commune in the Haute-Garonne department in southwestern France.

== Geography ==
The Louge flows northeast through the middle of the commune and crosses the village.

== Population ==
Historical population
Year	Pop.	±% p.a.
1968	1,041	—
1975	1,126	+1.13%
1982	1,289	+1.95%
1990	1,517	+2.06%
1999	1,943	+2.79%
2007	2,531	+3.36%
2012	2,742	+1.61%
2017	3,050	+2.15%
2023	3,798	+3.72%
Source: INSEE

== Transport ==
- Gare du Fauga

== Heraldry ==
Arms of Lavernose-Lacasse	Tierced in pairle: 1st sable with a cross clechée and pommée of twelve pieces or and filled gules, 2nd azure with an inverted branch of alder proper, 3rd or with an inverted branch of oak proper.

== See also ==
- Communes of the Haute-Garonne department
- Alfred Mayssonnié
