= Saint-Hilaire, Haute-Garonne =

Saint-Hilaire
- Commune
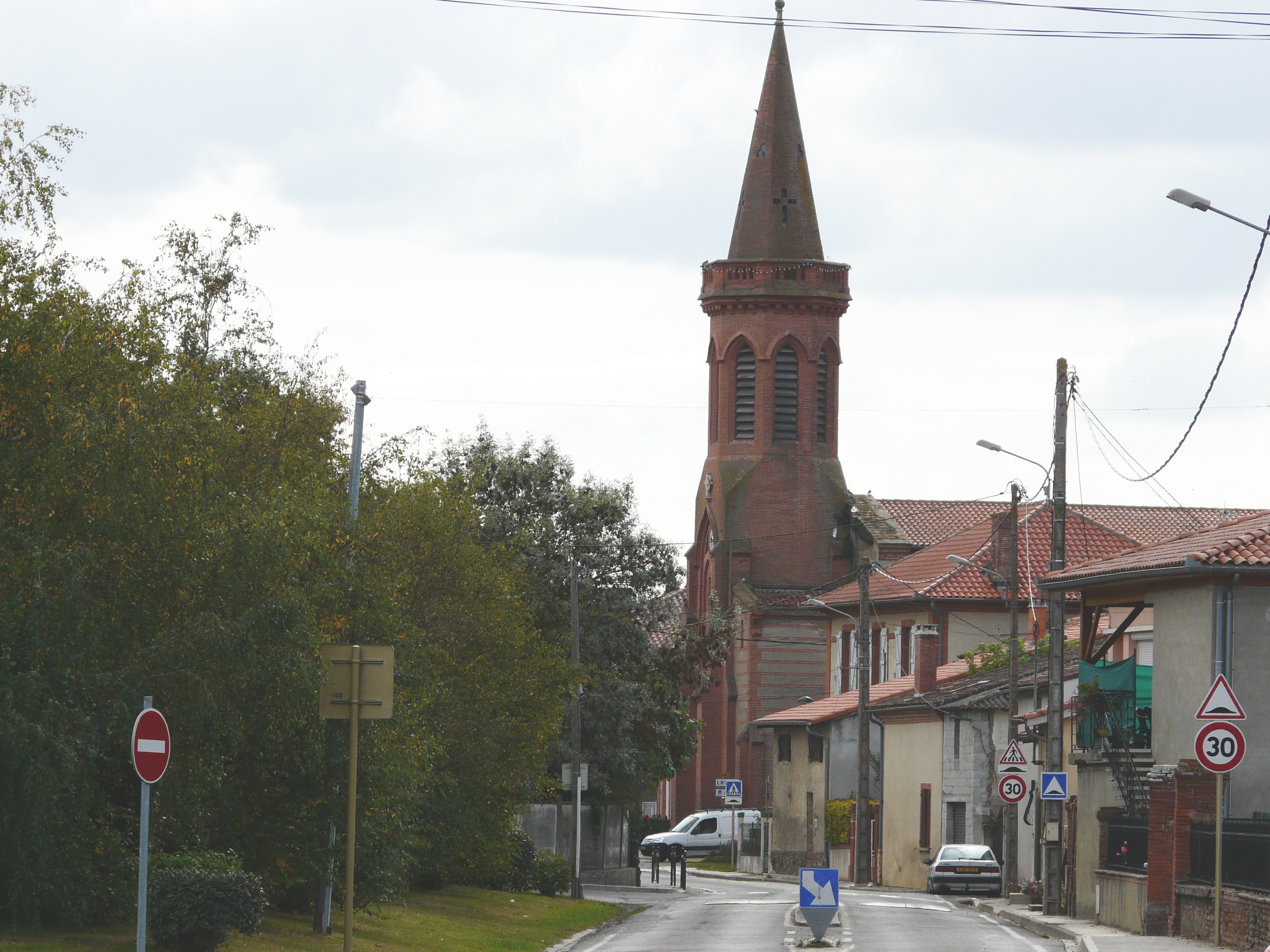
- The church in Saint-Hilaire

- Coat of arms
- Location of Saint-Hilaire
- Location within France Location within Occitanie
- Coordinates: 43°25′25″N 1°16′44″E
- Country: France
- Region: Occitania
- Department: Haute-Garonne
- Arrondissement: Muret
- Canton: Muret
- Intercommunality: Le Muretain Agglo

Government
  - Mayor (2020–2026): André Morère
- Area^{1}: 6.33 km^{2} (2.44 sq mi)
- Elevation: 182 m (597 ft)
- Highest elevation: 198 m (650 ft)
- Lowest elevation: 175 m (574 ft)
- Population (2023): 1,807
  - Density: 285/km^{2} (739/sq mi)
- Time zone: UTC+01:00 (CET)
  - Summer (DST): UTC+02:00 (CEST)
- INSEE/Postal code: 31486 /31410
- ^{1} French Land Register data, which excludes lakes, ponds, glaciers > 1 km^{2} (0.386 sq mi or 247 acres) and river estuaries.

Saint-Hilaire (French pronunciation: [sɛ̃.t‿ilɛʁ]; Occitan: Sent Alari) is a commune in the Haute-Garonne department in southwestern France.

== Population ==
Historical population
Year	Pop.	±% p.a.
1968	315	—
1975	389	+3.06%
1982	459	+2.39%
1990	504	+1.18%
1999	708	+3.85%
2007	965	+3.95%
2012	1,071	+2.11%
2017	1,219	+2.62%
2023	1,807	+6.78%
Source: INSEE

== See also ==
- Communes of the Haute-Garonne department
