= Bragayrac =

- Commune
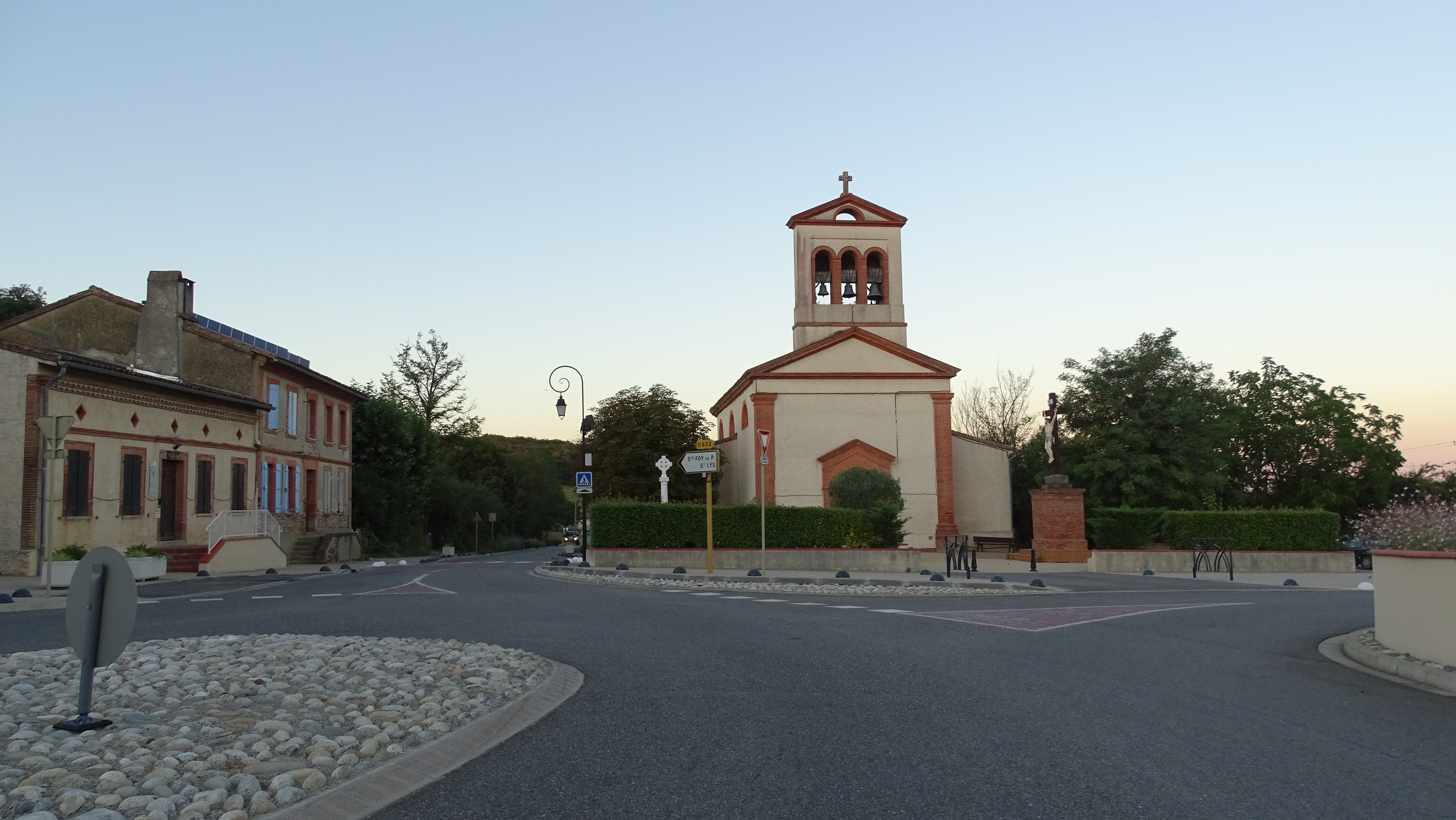
- The church in Bragayrac
- Location of Bragayrac
- Location within France Location within Occitanie
- Coordinates: 43°28′59″N 1°04′14″E
- Country: France
- Region: Occitania
- Department: Haute-Garonne
- Arrondissement: Muret
- Canton: Plaisance-du-Touch
- Intercommunality: Le Muretain Agglo

Government
  - Mayor (2020–2026): Gilbert Deschamps
- Area^{1}: 8.25 km^{2} (3.19 sq mi)
- Elevation: 272 m (892 ft)
- Highest elevation: 326 m (1,070 ft)
- Lowest elevation: 204 m (669 ft)
- Population (2023): 311
  - Density: 37.7/km^{2} (97.6/sq mi)
- Time zone: UTC+01:00 (CET)
  - Summer (DST): UTC+02:00 (CEST)
- INSEE/Postal code: 31087 /31470
- ^{1} French Land Register data, which excludes lakes, ponds, glaciers > 1 km^{2} (0.386 sq mi or 247 acres) and river estuaries.

Bragayrac (French pronunciation: [bʁaɡɛʁak]; Occitan: Bragairac) is a commune in the Haute-Garonne department in southwestern France.

== Population ==
Historical population
Year	Pop.	±% p.a.
1968	128	—
1975	191	+5.88%
1982	200	+0.66%
1990	197	−0.19%
1999	249	+2.64%
2007	269	+0.97%
2012	296	+1.93%
2017	326	+1.95%
2023	311	−0.78%
Source: INSEE

The inhabitants of the commune are known as Bragayracais or Bragayracois in French.

== See also ==
- Communes of the Haute-Garonne department
