= Empeaux =

- Commune
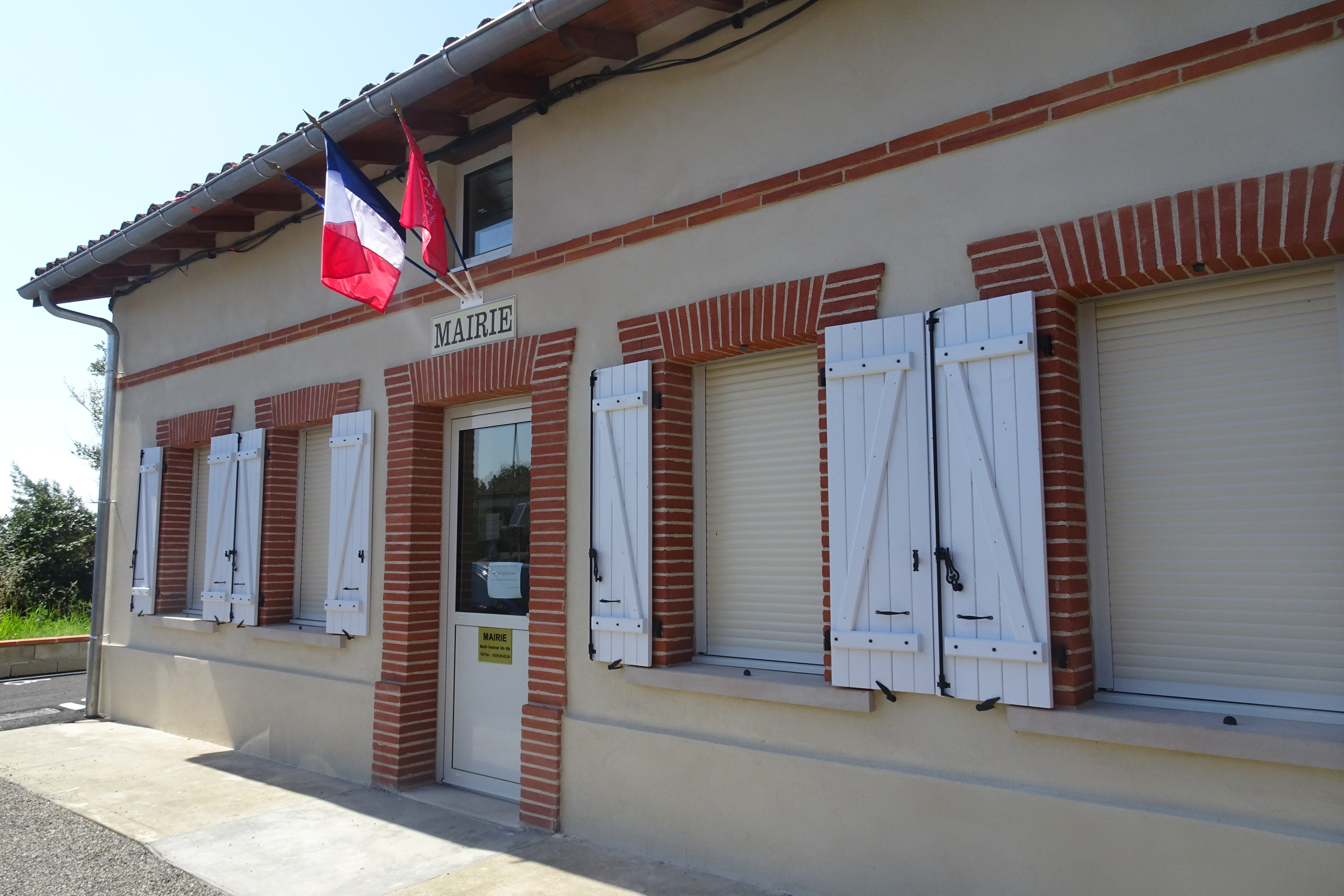
- The town hall in Empeaux
- Location of Empeaux
- Location within France Location within Occitanie
- Coordinates: 43°31′53″N 1°05′18″E
- Country: France
- Region: Occitania
- Department: Haute-Garonne
- Arrondissement: Muret
- Canton: Plaisance-du-Touch
- Intercommunality: Le Muretain Agglo

Government
  - Mayor (2020–2026): Robert Cassagne
- Area^{1}: 4.56 km^{2} (1.76 sq mi)
- Elevation: 320 m (1,050 ft)
- Highest elevation: 311 m (1,020 ft)
- Lowest elevation: 171 m (561 ft)
- Population (2023): 314
  - Density: 68.9/km^{2} (178/sq mi)
- Time zone: UTC+01:00 (CET)
  - Summer (DST): UTC+02:00 (CEST)
- INSEE/Postal code: 31166 /31470
- ^{1} French Land Register data, which excludes lakes, ponds, glaciers > 1 km^{2} (0.386 sq mi or 247 acres) and river estuaries.

Empeaux (Occitan: Cach) is a commune in the Haute-Garonne department in southwestern France.

== Population ==
Historical population
Year	Pop.	±% p.a.
1968	118	—
1975	131	+1.50%
1982	124	−0.78%
1990	142	+1.71%
1999	163	+1.54%
2007	202	+2.72%
2012	249	+4.27%
2017	256	+0.56%
2023	314	+3.46%
Source: INSEE

The inhabitants of the commune are known as Empeusiens in French.

== See also ==
- Communes of the Haute-Garonne department
