= Canton of Plaisance-du-Touch =

Coordinates: 43.56°N 1.29°E

The canton of Plaisance-du-Touch is an administrative division of the Haute-Garonne department, southern France. It was created at the French canton reorganisation which came into effect in March 2015. Its seat is in Plaisance-du-Touch.

It consists of the following communes:

1. Bonrepos-sur-Aussonnelle
2. Bragayrac
3. Empeaux
4. Fonsorbes
5. Fontenilles
6. Plaisance-du-Touch
7. Sabonnères
8. Saiguède
9. Saint-Lys
10. Saint-Thomas
