= Villate =

- Commune
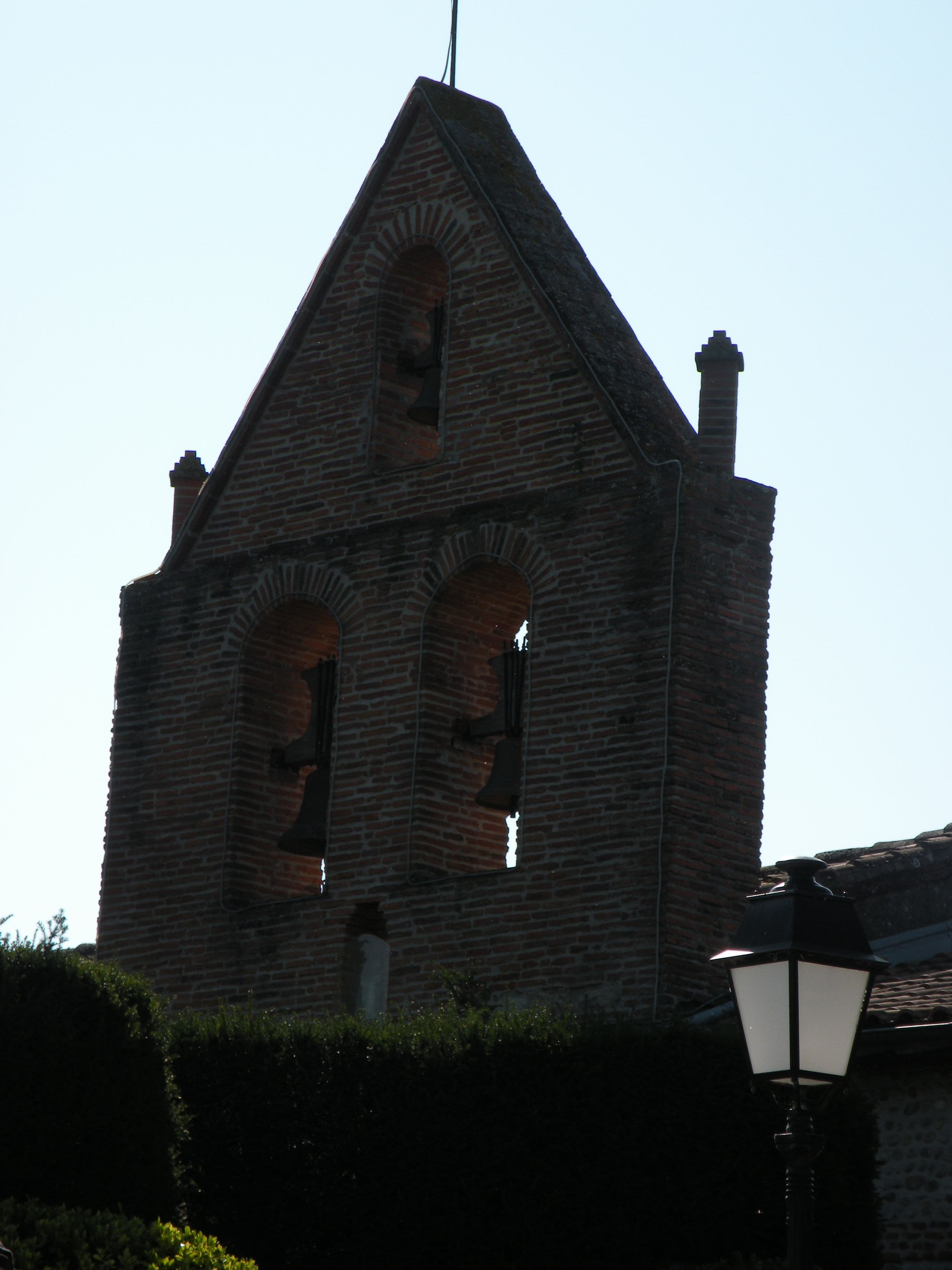
- The church bell tower in Villate

- Coat of arms
- Location of Villate
- Location within France Location within Occitanie
- Coordinates: 43°28′16″N 1°22′48″E
- Country: France
- Region: Occitania
- Department: Haute-Garonne
- Arrondissement: Muret
- Canton: Portet-sur-Garonne
- Intercommunality: Le Muretain Agglo

Government
  - Mayor (2020–2026): Jean-Claude Garaud
- Area^{1}: 1.82 km^{2} (0.70 sq mi)
- Elevation: 138 m (453 ft)
- Highest elevation: 172 m (564 ft)
- Lowest elevation: 161 m (528 ft)
- Population (2023): 1,233
  - Density: 677/km^{2} (1,750/sq mi)
- Time zone: UTC+01:00 (CET)
  - Summer (DST): UTC+02:00 (CEST)
- INSEE/Postal code: 31580 /31860
- ^{1} French Land Register data, which excludes lakes, ponds, glaciers > 1 km^{2} (0.386 sq mi or 247 acres) and river estuaries.

Villate (French pronunciation: [vilat]; Occitan: Vilata) is a commune in the Haute-Garonne department in southwestern France.

== Population ==
Historical population
| Year | Pop. | ±% p.a. |
|---|---|---|
| 1968 | 179 | — |
| 1975 | 386 | +11.60% |
| 1982 | 515 | +4.21% |
| 1990 | 556 | +0.96% |
| 1999 | 588 | +0.62% |
| 2007 | 754 | +3.16% |
| 2012 | 871 | +2.93% |
| 2017 | 920 | +1.10% |
| 2023 | 1,233 | +5.00% |
Source: INSEE

The inhabitants of the commune are known as Villatois in French.

== See also ==
- Communes of the Haute-Garonne department
