= Canton of Portet-sur-Garonne =

Coordinates: 43.53°N 1.40°E

The canton of Portet-sur-Garonne is an administrative division of the Haute-Garonne department, southern France. Its borders were modified at the French canton reorganisation which came into effect in March 2015. Its seat is in Portet-sur-Garonne.

It consists of the following communes:

1. Eaunes
2. Labarthe-sur-Lèze
3. Lagardelle-sur-Lèze
4. Pinsaguel
5. Pins-Justaret
6. Portet-sur-Garonne
7. Roques
8. Roquettes
9. Saubens
10. Venerque
11. Vernet
12. Villate
