= Sabonnères =

- Commune
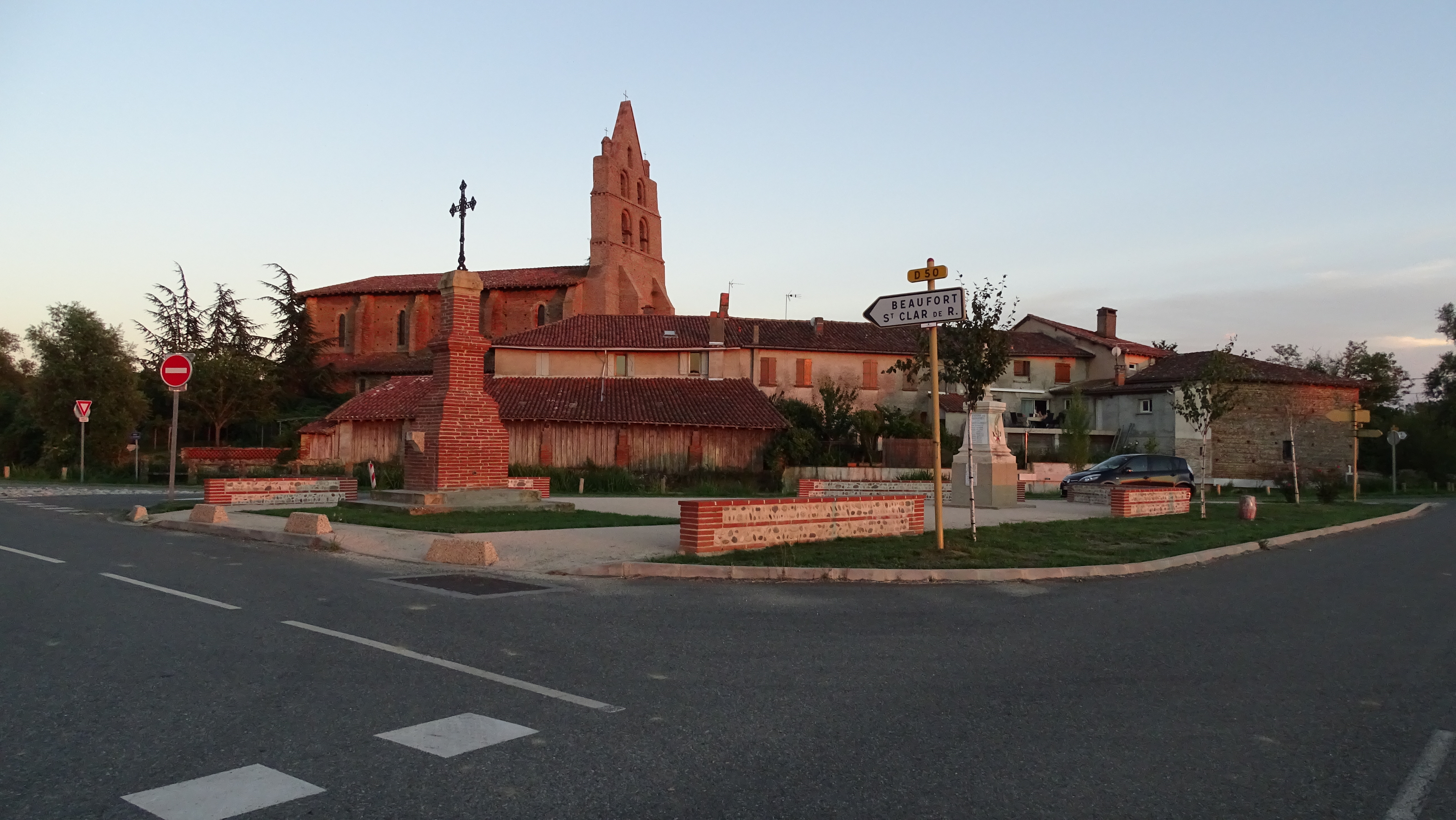
- The church in Sabonnères
- Location of Sabonnères
- Location within France Location within Occitanie
- Coordinates: 43°28′01″N 1°03′53″E
- Country: France
- Region: Occitania
- Department: Haute-Garonne
- Arrondissement: Muret
- Canton: Plaisance-du-Touch
- Intercommunality: Le Muretain Agglo

Government
  - Mayor (2020–2026): Pierre Bérail
- Area^{1}: 12.3 km^{2} (4.7 sq mi)
- Elevation: 320 m (1,050 ft)
- Highest elevation: 331 m (1,086 ft)
- Lowest elevation: 196 m (643 ft)
- Population (2023): 332
  - Density: 27.0/km^{2} (69.9/sq mi)
- Time zone: UTC+01:00 (CET)
  - Summer (DST): UTC+02:00 (CEST)
- INSEE/Postal code: 31464 /31370
- ^{1} French Land Register data, which excludes lakes, ponds, glaciers > 1 km^{2} (0.386 sq mi or 247 acres) and river estuaries.

Sabonnères (French pronunciation: [sabɔnɛʁ]; Occitan: Sabonèras) is a commune in the Haute-Garonne department in southwestern France.

== Population ==
Historical population
Year	Pop.	±% p.a.
1968	181	—
1975	200	+1.44%
1982	192	−0.58%
1990	178	−0.94%
1999	218	+2.28%
2007	279	+3.13%
2012	299	+1.39%
2017	315	+1.05%
2023	332	+0.88%
Source: INSEE

The inhabitants of Sabonnères are known as Sabonnériens in French.

== See also ==
- Communes of the Haute-Garonne department
