= Fonsorbes =

Fonsorbes Fontsòrbas (Occitan)
- Commune
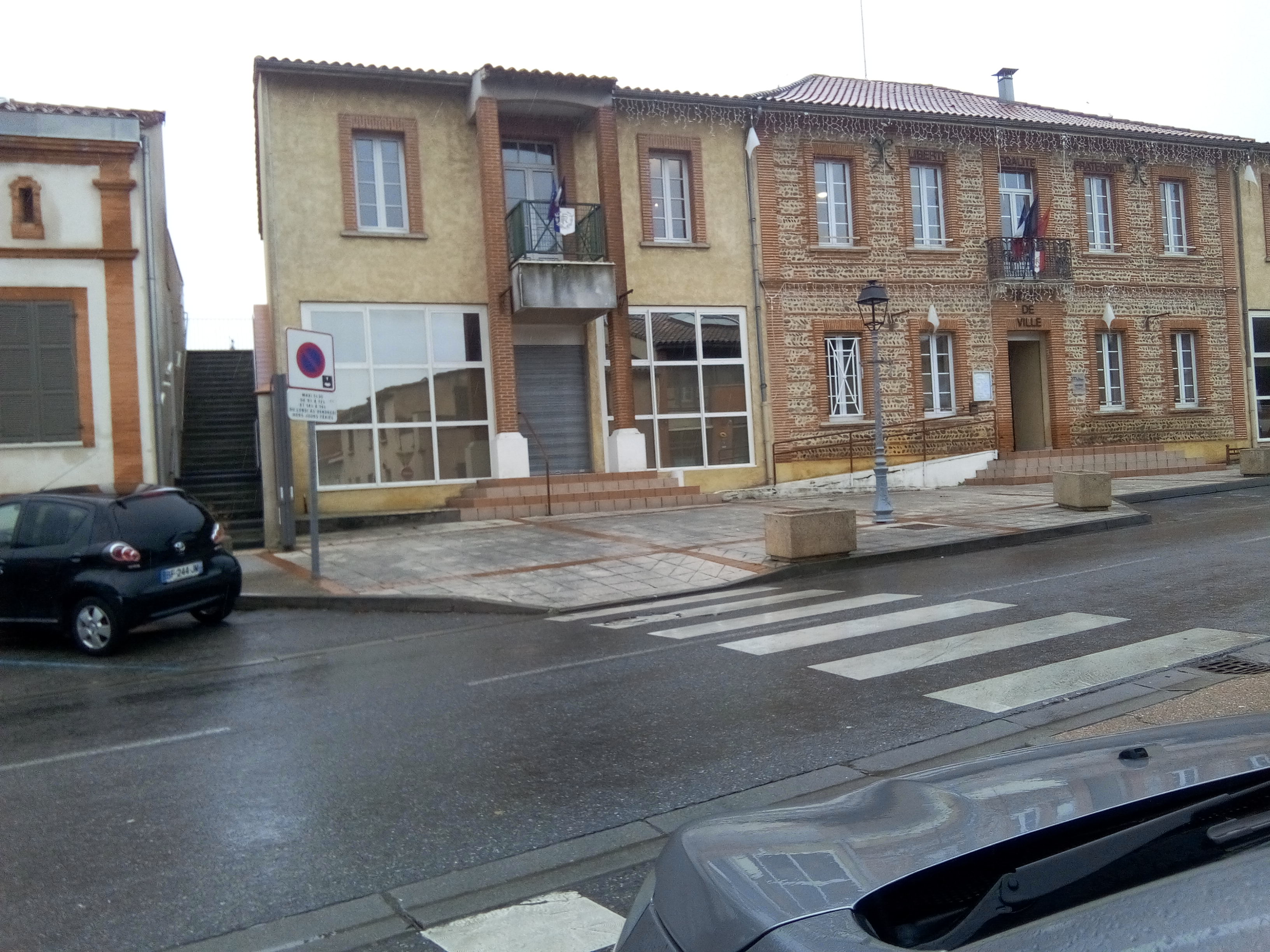
- The town hall in Fonsorbes

- Coat of arms
- Location of Fonsorbes
- Location within France Location within Occitanie
- Coordinates: 43°32′13″N 1°13′55″E
- Country: France
- Region: Occitania
- Department: Haute-Garonne
- Arrondissement: Muret
- Canton: Plaisance-du-Touch
- Intercommunality: Le Muretain Agglo

Government
  - Mayor (2020–2026): Françoise Simeon
- Area^{1}: 19.03 km^{2} (7.35 sq mi)
- Highest elevation: 213 m (699 ft)
- Lowest elevation: 169 m (554 ft)
- Population (2023): 12,954
  - Density: 680.7/km^{2} (1,763/sq mi)
- Time zone: UTC+01:00 (CET)
  - Summer (DST): UTC+02:00 (CEST)
- INSEE/Postal code: 31187 /31470
- ^{1} French Land Register data, which excludes lakes, ponds, glaciers > 1 km^{2} (0.386 sq mi or 247 acres) and river estuaries.

Fonsorbes (French pronunciation: [fɔ̃sɔʁb]; Occitan: Fontsòrbas) is a commune of the Haute-Garonne department in southwestern France.

== Population ==
The inhabitants of the commune are known as Fonsorbais.

Historical population

Year	Pop.	±% p.a.
1793	510	—
1800	531	+0.58%
1806	606	+2.23%
1821	661	+0.58%
1831	675	+0.21%
1836	733	+1.66%
1841	754	+0.57%
1846	806	+1.34%
1851	856	+1.21%
1856	825	−0.74%
1861	868	+1.02%
1866	827	−0.96%
1872	841	+0.28%
1876	870	+0.85%
1881	879	+0.21%
1886	870	−0.21%
1891	864	−0.14%
1896	835	−0.68%
1901	782	−1.30%

Year	Pop.	±% p.a.
1906	653	−3.54%
1911	642	−0.34%
1921	564	−1.29%
1926	572	+0.28%
1931	560	−0.42%
1936	528	−1.17%
1946	562	+0.63%
1954	650	+1.84%
1962	755	+1.89%
1968	882	+2.63%
1975	2,049	+12.80%
1982	3,241	+6.77%
1990	4,252	+3.45%
1999	6,909	+5.54%
2007	10,891	+5.85%
2012	11,828	+1.66%
2017	11,743	−0.14%
2023	12,954	+1.65%

Source: EHESS and INSEE (1968–2023)

== Twin towns ==
Fonsorbes is twinned with:

- La Fatarella, Spain (Since 1994).

== See also ==
- Communes of the Haute-Garonne department
