= Saubens =

- Commune
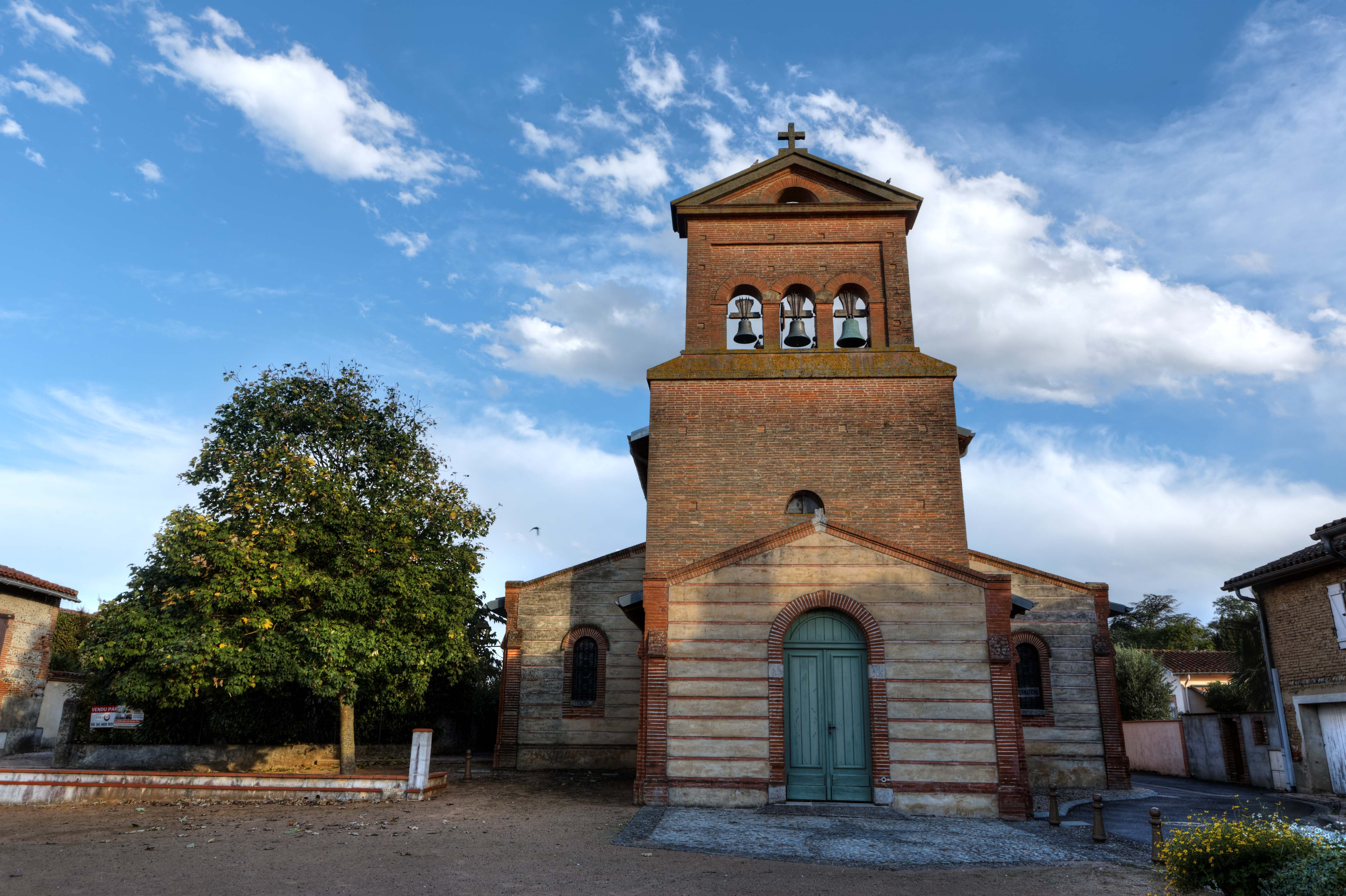
- The church in Saubens

- Coat of arms
- Location of Saubens
- Location within France Location within Occitanie
- Coordinates: 43°28′49″N 1°20′57″E
- Country: France
- Region: Occitania
- Department: Haute-Garonne
- Arrondissement: Muret
- Canton: Portet-sur-Garonne
- Intercommunality: Le Muretain Agglo

Government
  - Mayor (2020–2026): Jean-Marc Bergia
- Area^{1}: 5.99 km^{2} (2.31 sq mi)
- Elevation: 160 m (520 ft)
- Highest elevation: 195 m (640 ft)
- Lowest elevation: 147 m (482 ft)
- Population (2023): 2,364
  - Density: 395/km^{2} (1,020/sq mi)
- Time zone: UTC+01:00 (CET)
  - Summer (DST): UTC+02:00 (CEST)
- INSEE/Postal code: 31533 /31600
- ^{1} French Land Register data, which excludes lakes, ponds, glaciers > 1 km^{2} (0.386 sq mi or 247 acres) and river estuaries.

Saubens (French pronunciation: [sobɛ̃s]) is a commune in the Haute-Garonne department in southwestern France.

== Population ==
The inhabitants of the commune are known as Saubenois in French.

Historical population
Year	Pop.	±% p.a.
1968	222	—
1975	536	+13.42%
1982	898	+7.65%
1990	1,010	+1.48%
1999	1,299	+2.84%
2007	1,723	+3.59%
2012	2,065	+3.69%
2017	2,225	+1.50%
2023	2,364	+1.02%
Source: INSEE

== See also ==
- Communes of the Haute-Garonne department
