= Frouzins =

- Commune
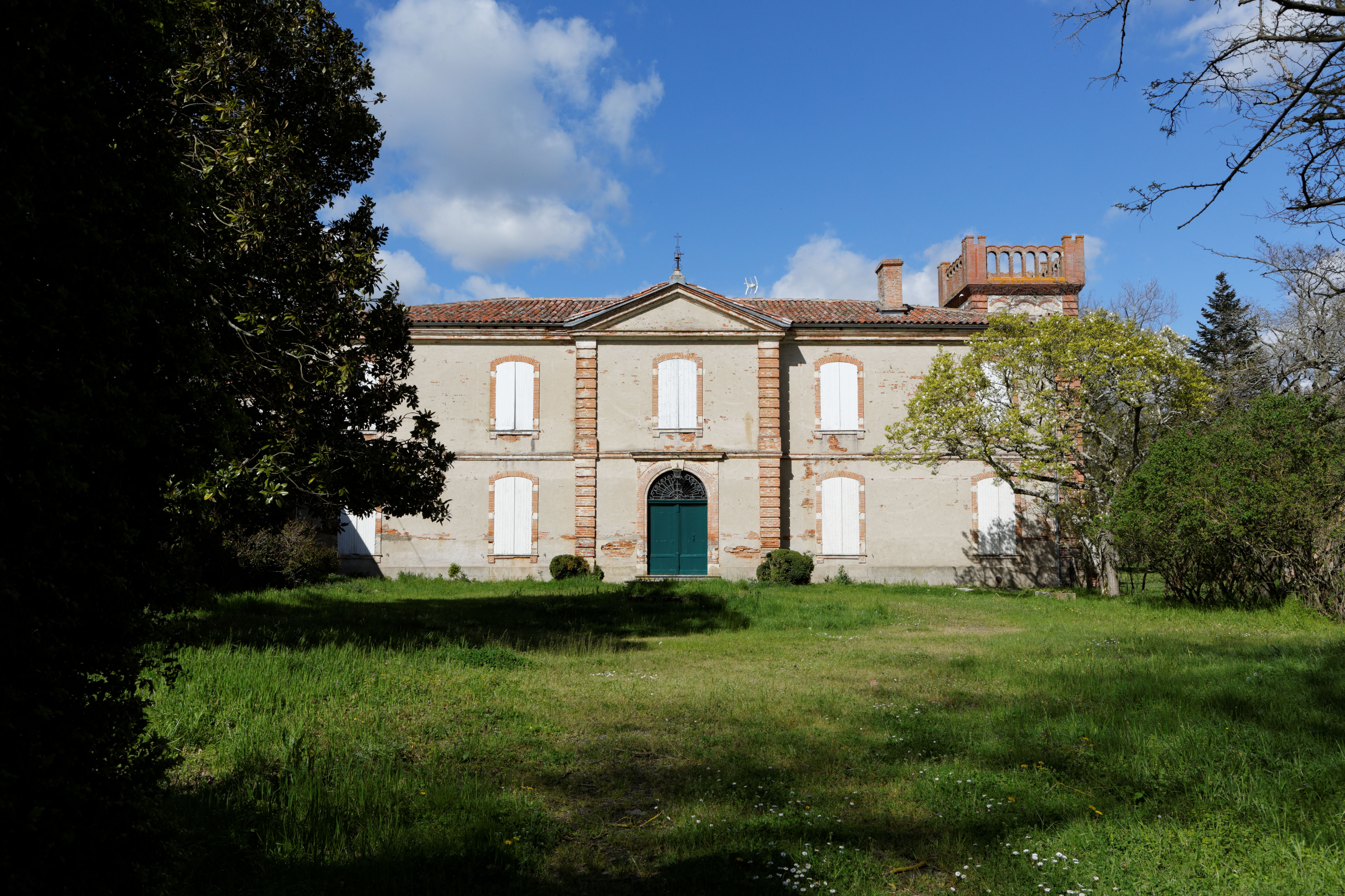
- The chateau in Frouzins
- Location of Frouzins
- Location within France Location within Occitanie
- Coordinates: 43°31′02″N 1°19′32″E
- Country: France
- Region: Occitania
- Department: Haute-Garonne
- Arrondissement: Muret
- Canton: Muret
- Intercommunality: Le Muretain Agglo

Government
  - Mayor (2020–2026): Jérôme Laffon
- Area^{1}: 7.91 km^{2} (3.05 sq mi)
- Elevation: 175 m (574 ft)
- Highest elevation: 176 m (577 ft)
- Lowest elevation: 157 m (515 ft)
- Population (2023): 9,805
  - Density: 1,240/km^{2} (3,210/sq mi)
- Time zone: UTC+01:00 (CET)
  - Summer (DST): UTC+02:00 (CEST)
- INSEE/Postal code: 31203 /31270
- ^{1} French Land Register data, which excludes lakes, ponds, glaciers > 1 km^{2} (0.386 sq mi or 247 acres) and river estuaries.

Frouzins is a commune in the Haute-Garonne department in southwestern France. It lies 15 km southwest from the centre of Toulouse and 6 km north of Muret.

== Population ==
Historical population

Year	Pop.	±% p.a.
1793	129	—
1800	472	+20.36%
1806	488	+0.56%
1821	486	−0.03%
1831	487	+0.02%
1836	471	−0.67%
1841	483	+0.50%
1846	543	+2.37%
1851	546	+0.11%
1856	531	−0.56%
1861	523	−0.30%
1866	533	+0.38%
1872	497	−1.16%
1876	522	+1.23%
1881	549	+1.01%
1886	577	+1.00%
1891	527	−1.80%
1896	486	−1.61%
1901	476	−0.41%

Year	Pop.	±% p.a.
1906	424	−2.29%
1911	421	−0.14%
1921	374	−1.18%
1926	344	−1.66%
1931	391	+2.59%
1936	408	+0.85%
1946	454	+1.07%
1954	570	+2.89%
1962	683	+2.29%
1968	1,273	+10.93%
1975	2,155	+7.81%
1982	3,194	+5.78%
1990	3,941	+2.66%
1999	5,936	+4.66%
2007	6,944	+1.98%
2012	8,426	+3.94%
2017	9,022	+1.38%
2023	9,805	+1.40%

Source: EHESS and INSEE (1968-2023)

== Sister cities ==
- Calanda, Spain

== See also ==
- Communes of the Haute-Garonne department
