= Le Muretain Agglo =

- Communauté d'agglomération
- Interactive map of Le Muretain Agglo
- Country: France
- Region: Occitania
- Department: Haute-Garonne
- No. of communes: {{{nbcomm}}}
- Established: 2017
- Area: 319.8 km^{2} (123.5 sq mi)
- Population (2017): 120,348
  - Density: 376.3/km^{2} (974.7/sq mi)
- Website: www.agglo-muretain.fr

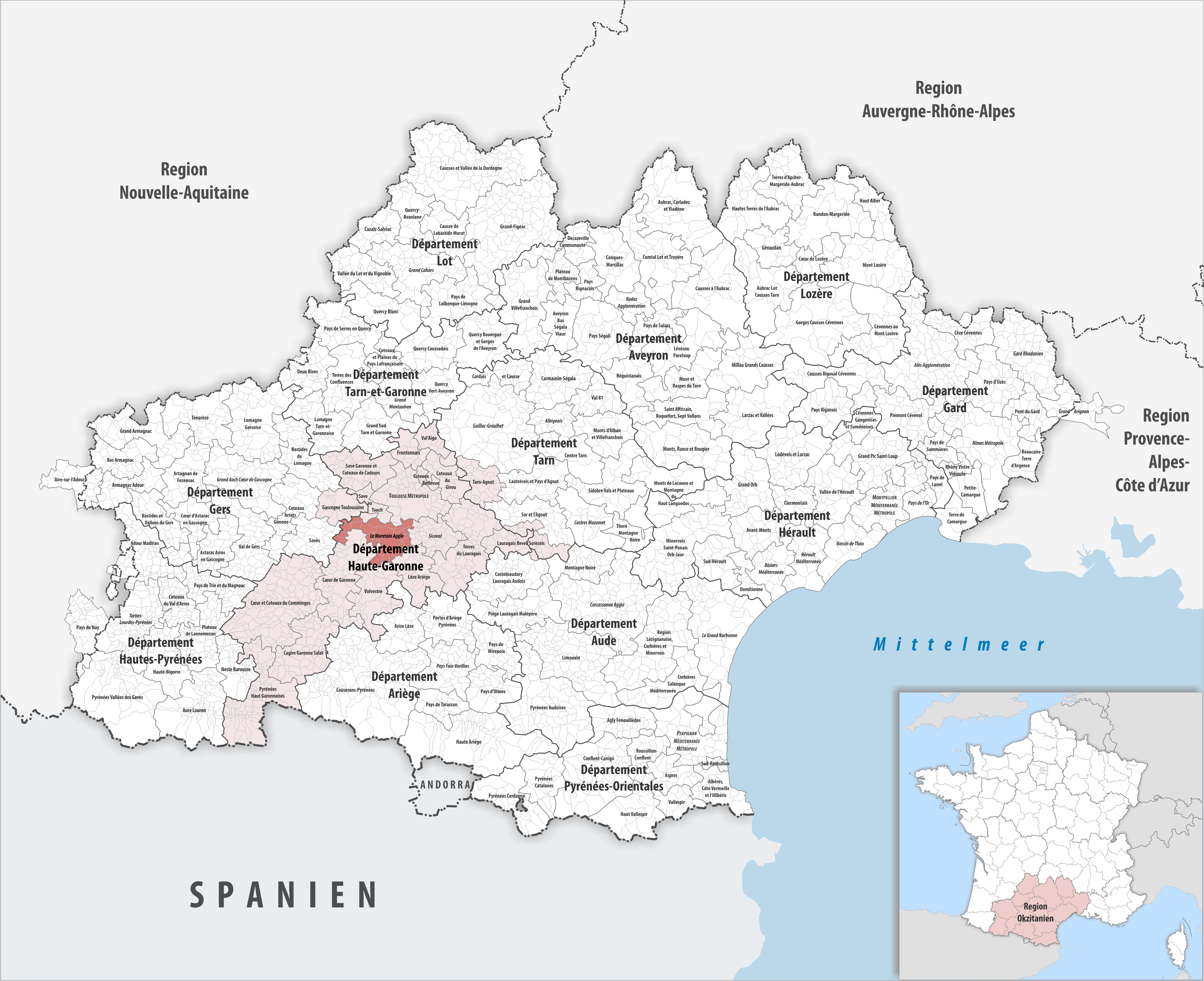
Lage des Gemeindeverbandes Le Muretain Agglo

Le Muretain Agglo is the communauté d'agglomération, an intercommunal structure, centred on the city of Muret. It is located in the Haute-Garonne department, in the Occitanie region, southern France. It was created in January 2017. Its seat is in Muret. Its area is 319.8 km^{2}. Its population was 120,348 in 2017, of which 24,945 in Muret proper.

== Composition ==
The communauté d'agglomération consists of the following 26 communes:

1. Bonrepos-sur-Aussonnelle
2. Bragayrac
3. Eaunes
4. Empeaux
5. Le Fauga
6. Fonsorbes
7. Frouzins
8. Labarthe-sur-Lèze
9. Labastidette
10. Lamasquère
11. Lavernose-Lacasse
12. Muret
13. Pinsaguel
14. Pins-Justaret
15. Portet-sur-Garonne
16. Roques
17. Roquettes
18. Sabonnères
19. Saiguède
20. Saint-Clar-de-Rivière
21. Saint-Hilaire
22. Saint-Lys
23. Saint-Thomas
24. Saubens
25. Seysses
26. Villate
