= Lamasquère =

- Commune
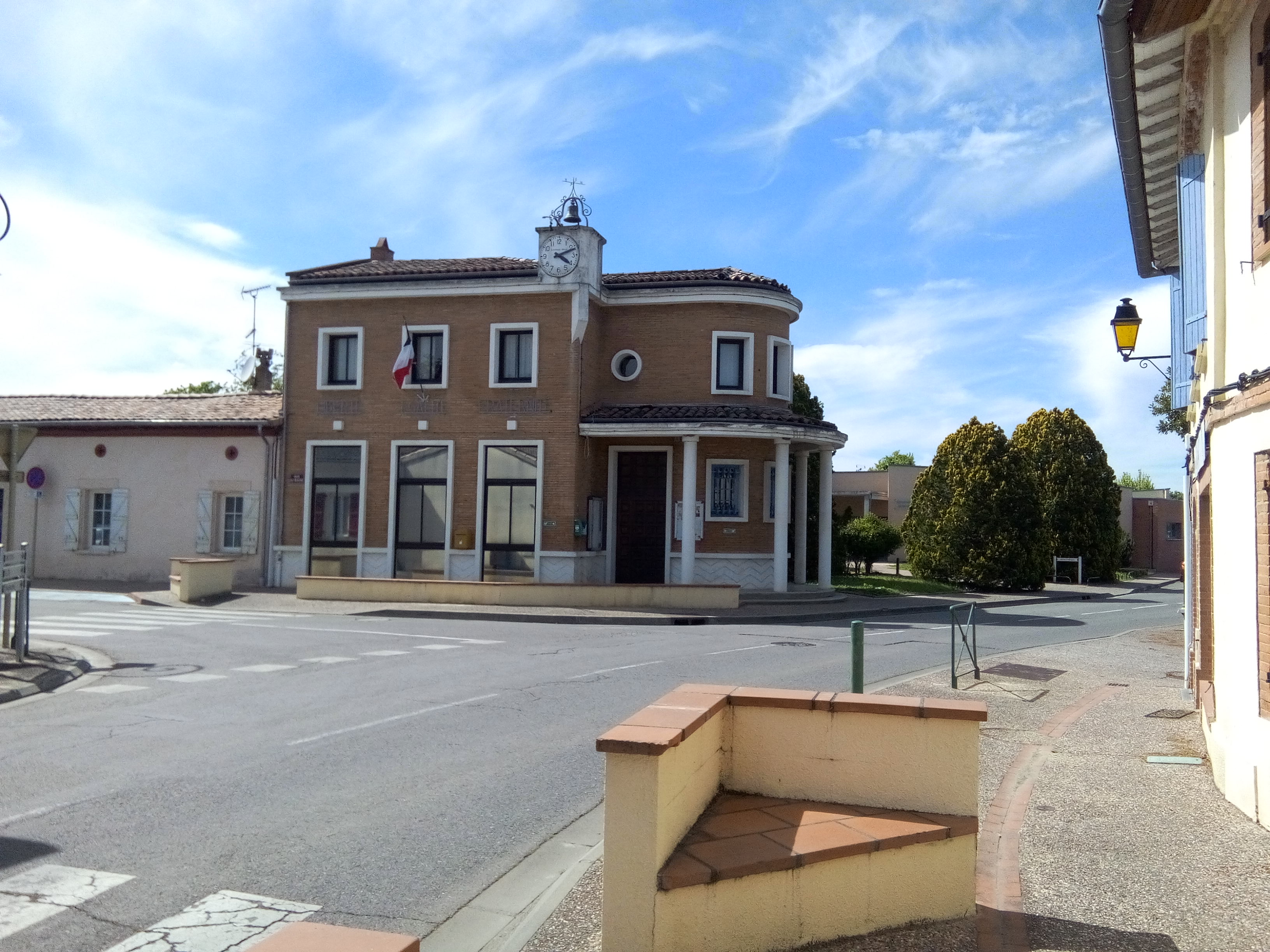
- The town hall in Lamasquère
- Location of Lamasquère
- Location within France Location within Occitanie
- Coordinates: 43°29′01″N 1°14′43″E
- Country: France
- Region: Occitania
- Department: Haute-Garonne
- Arrondissement: Muret
- Canton: Muret
- Intercommunality: Le Muretain Agglo

Government
  - Mayor (2020–2026): Christelle Matheu
- Area^{1}: 6.11 km^{2} (2.36 sq mi)
- Elevation: 185 m (607 ft)
- Highest elevation: 187 m (614 ft)
- Lowest elevation: 180 m (590 ft)
- Population (2023): 1,682
  - Density: 275/km^{2} (713/sq mi)
- Time zone: UTC+01:00 (CET)
  - Summer (DST): UTC+02:00 (CEST)
- INSEE/Postal code: 31269 /31600
- ^{1} French Land Register data, which excludes lakes, ponds, glaciers > 1 km^{2} (0.386 sq mi or 247 acres) and river estuaries.

Lamasquère (French pronunciation: [lamaskɛʁ]; Occitan: La Masquèra) is a commune in the Haute-Garonne department in southwestern France.

== Population ==
Historical population
Year	Pop.	±% p.a.
1968	309	—
1975	426	+4.69%
1982	588	+4.71%
1990	715	+2.47%
1999	873	+2.24%
2007	1,213	+4.20%
2012	1,404	+2.97%
2017	1,462	+0.81%
2023	1,682	+2.36%
Source: INSEE

== See also ==
- Communes of the Haute-Garonne department
