= Labastidette =

- Commune
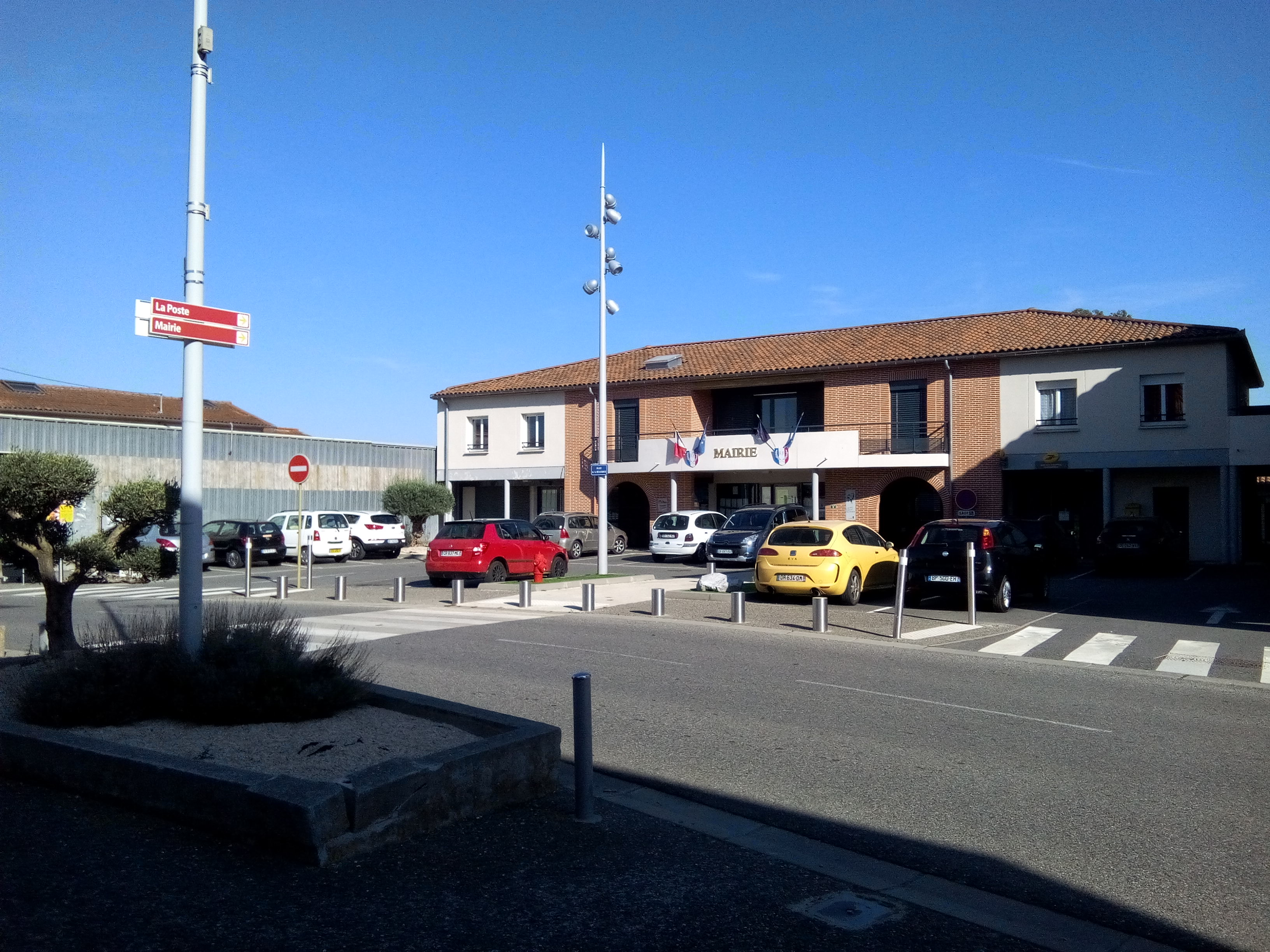
- The town hall in Labastidette

- Coat of arms
- Location of Labastidette
- Location within France Location within Occitanie
- Coordinates: 43°27′44″N 1°14′46″E
- Country: France
- Region: Occitania
- Department: Haute-Garonne
- Arrondissement: Muret
- Canton: Muret
- Intercommunality: Le Muretain Agglo

Government
  - Mayor (2020–2026): Olivier Authié
- Area^{1}: 6.27 km^{2} (2.42 sq mi)
- Elevation: 185 m (607 ft)
- Highest elevation: 219 m (719 ft)
- Lowest elevation: 186 m (610 ft)
- Population (2023): 2,930
  - Density: 467/km^{2} (1,210/sq mi)
- Time zone: UTC+01:00 (CET)
  - Summer (DST): UTC+02:00 (CEST)
- INSEE/Postal code: 31253 /31600
- ^{1} French Land Register data, which excludes lakes, ponds, glaciers > 1 km^{2} (0.386 sq mi or 247 acres) and river estuaries.

Labastidette (French pronunciation: [labastidɛt]; Occitan: La Bastideta) is a commune in the Haute-Garonne department in southwestern France.

== Population ==
Historical population
Year	Pop.	±% p.a.
1968	307	—
1975	559	+8.94%
1982	656	+2.31%
1990	980	+5.15%
1999	1,328	+3.43%
2007	1,968	+5.04%
2012	2,326	+3.40%
2017	2,563	+1.96%
2023	2,930	+2.26%
Source: INSEE

== See also ==
Communes of the Haute-Garonne department
