= Venerque =

- Commune
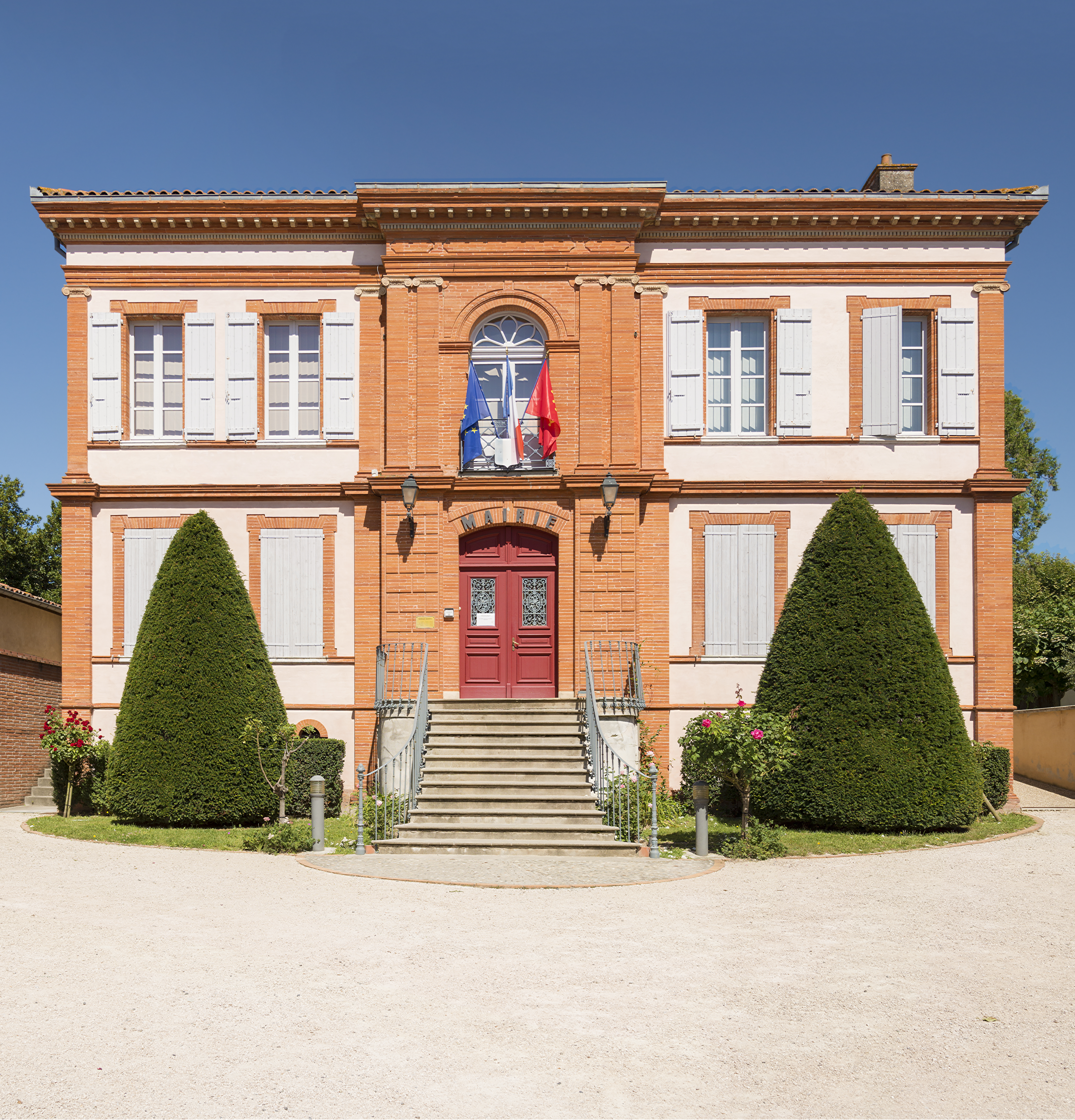
- Town hall

- Coat of arms
- Location of Venerque
- Location within France Location within Occitanie
- Coordinates: 43°26′03″N 1°26′40″E
- Country: France
- Region: Occitania
- Department: Haute-Garonne
- Arrondissement: Muret
- Canton: Portet-sur-Garonne

Government
  - Mayor (2020–2026): Michel Courtiade
- Area^{1}: 14.57 km^{2} (5.63 sq mi)
- Elevation: 312 m (1,024 ft)
- Highest elevation: 272 m (892 ft)
- Lowest elevation: 157 m (515 ft)
- Population (2023): 2,974
  - Density: 204.1/km^{2} (528.7/sq mi)
- Time zone: UTC+01:00 (CET)
  - Summer (DST): UTC+02:00 (CEST)
- INSEE/Postal code: 31572 /31810
- ^{1} French Land Register data, which excludes lakes, ponds, glaciers > 1 km^{2} (0.386 sq mi or 247 acres) and river estuaries.

Venerque (French pronunciation: [vənɛʁk]; Occitan: Venèrca) is a commune in the Haute-Garonne department in southwestern France. Venerque-le-Vernet station has rail connections to Toulouse, Foix and Latour-de-Carol.

== Population ==
The inhabitants of the commune are known as Venerquois or Venerquoises in French.

Historical population

Year	Pop.	±% p.a.
1793	818	—
1800	750	−1.23%
1806	796	+1.00%
1821	900	+0.82%
1831	941	+0.45%
1836	954	+0.27%
1841	986	+0.66%
1846	1,009	+0.46%
1851	1,008	−0.02%
1856	996	−0.24%
1861	988	−0.16%
1866	963	−0.51%
1872	933	−0.53%
1876	900	−0.90%
1881	913	+0.29%
1886	897	−0.35%
1891	910	+0.29%
1896	862	−1.08%
1901	786	−1.83%

Year	Pop.	±% p.a.
1906	757	−0.75%
1911	729	−0.75%
1921	703	−0.36%
1926	680	−0.66%
1931	736	+1.60%
1936	837	+2.61%
1946	894	+0.66%
1954	965	+0.96%
1962	1,022	+0.72%
1968	1,274	+3.74%
1975	1,510	+2.46%
1982	1,907	+3.39%
1990	2,158	+1.56%
1999	2,328	+0.85%
2007	1,872	−2.69%
2012	1,832	−0.43%
2017	2,164	+3.39%
2023	2,974	+5.44%

Source: EHESS and INSEE (1968-2023)

== Climate ==
Venerque has a modified oceanic climate with Mediterranean influences. According to the Köppen climate classification, its climate is classified as oceanic (Cfb).

The climate is characterized by mild and wet winters and relatively warm to hot summers, with limited annual temperature variation. Temperatures typically range between 3 and 10 °C in winter and between 20 and 30 °C in summer.

Precipitation is distributed throughout the year, with a slight increase during autumn and spring, while summers are relatively drier. The proximity of the municipality to the Ariège River valley contributes to the moderation of local climatic conditions.

== Monuments ==
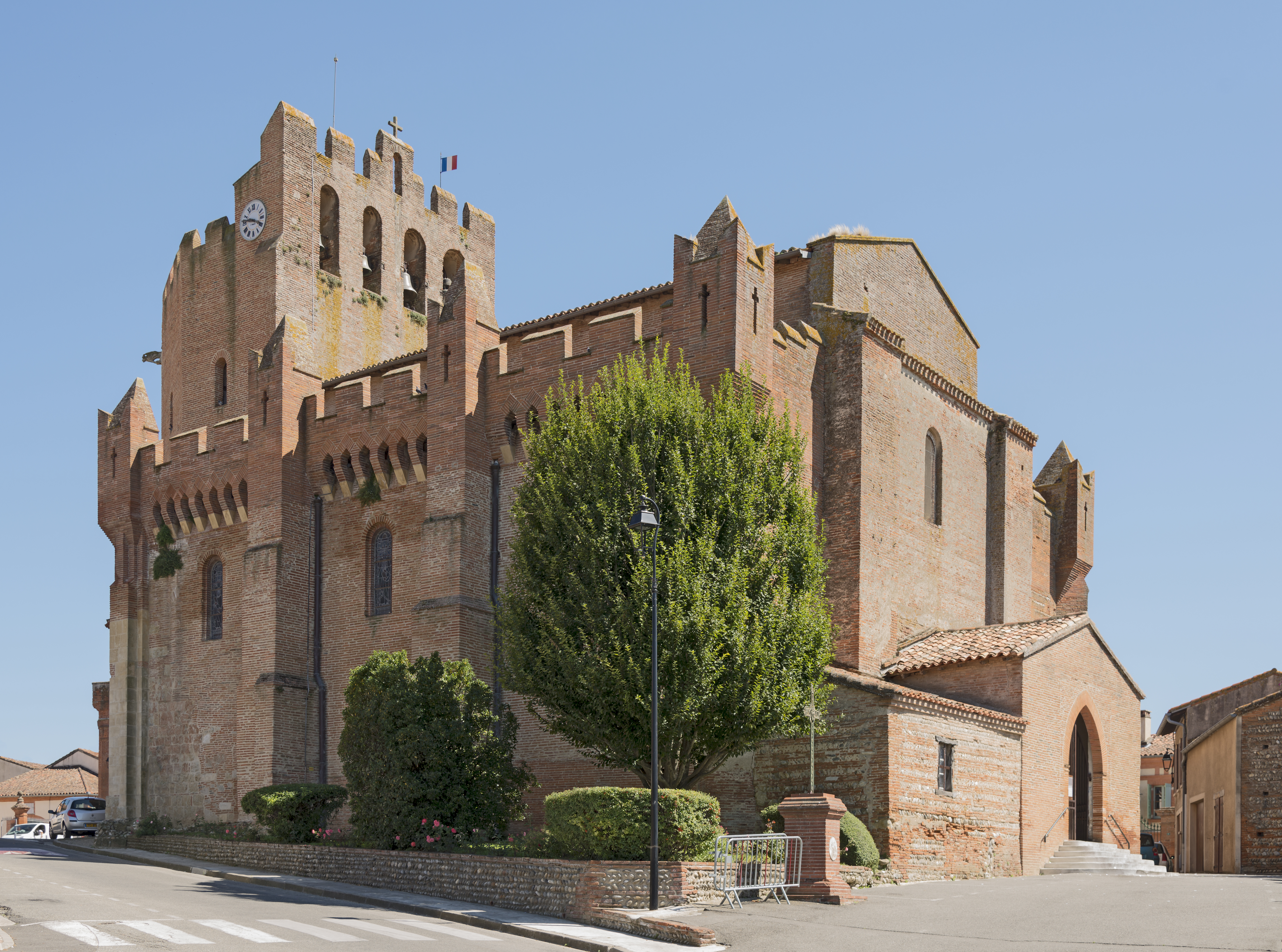
Church Saint-Pierre-et-Saint-Phébade

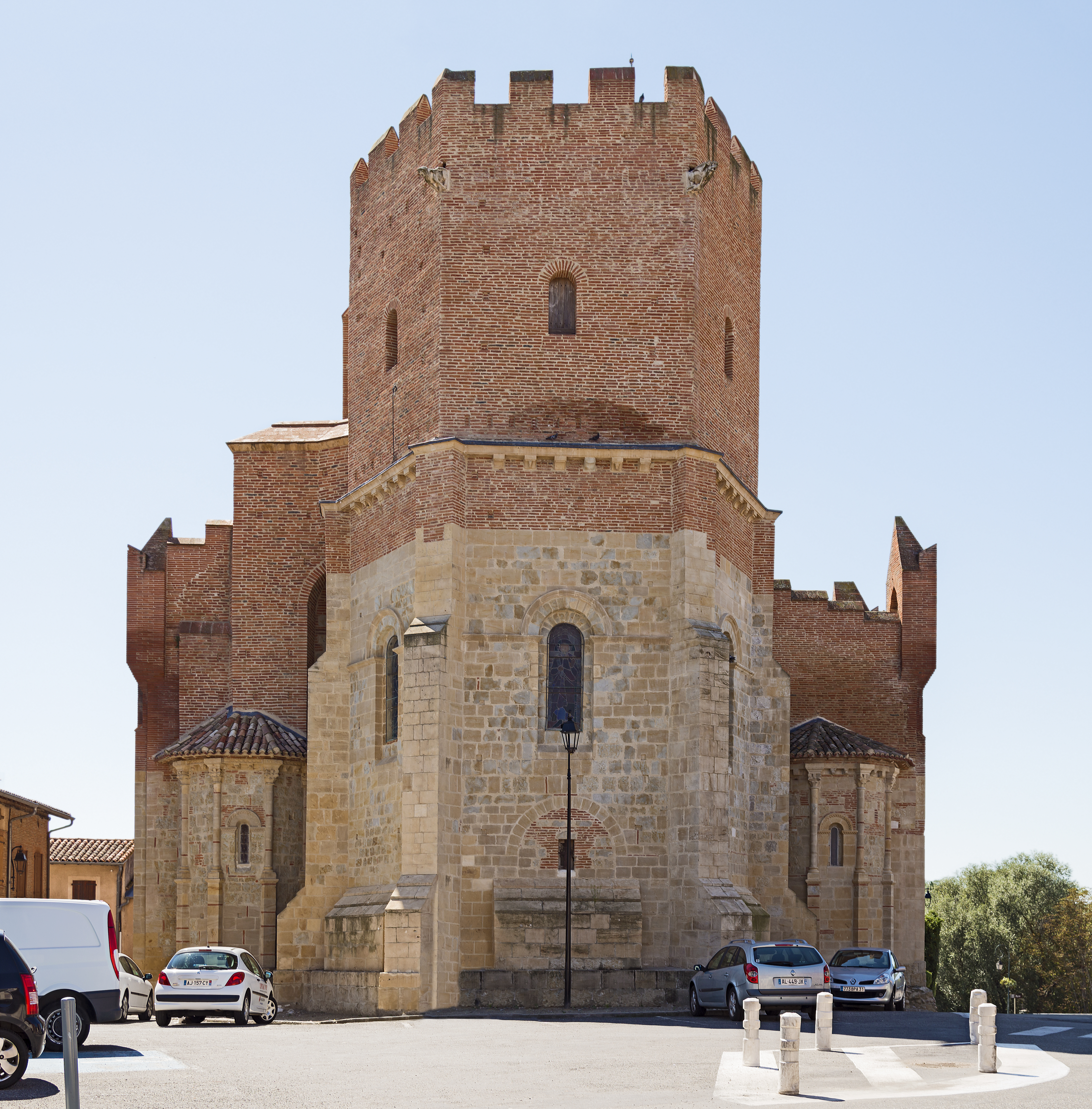
Apse

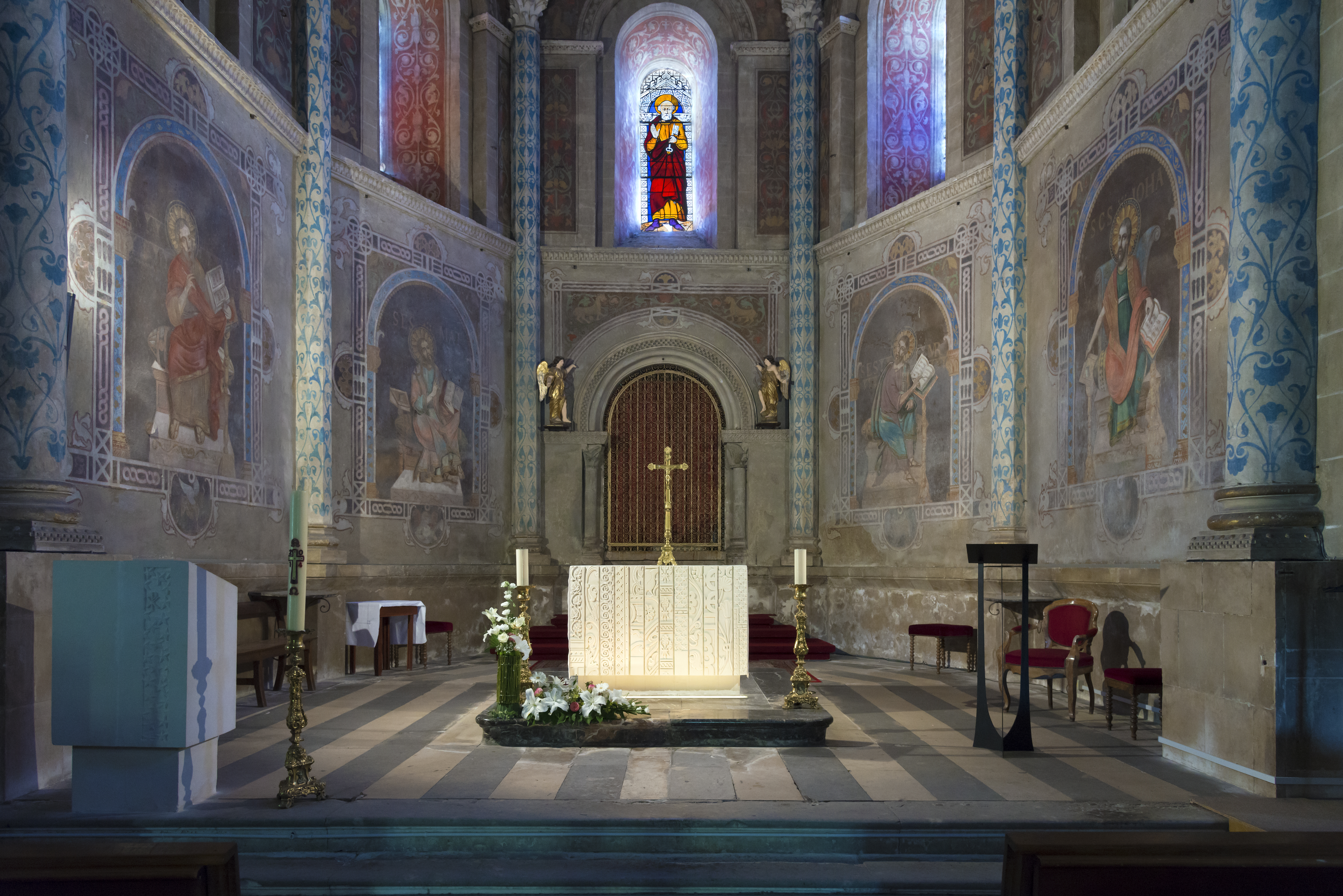
Altar

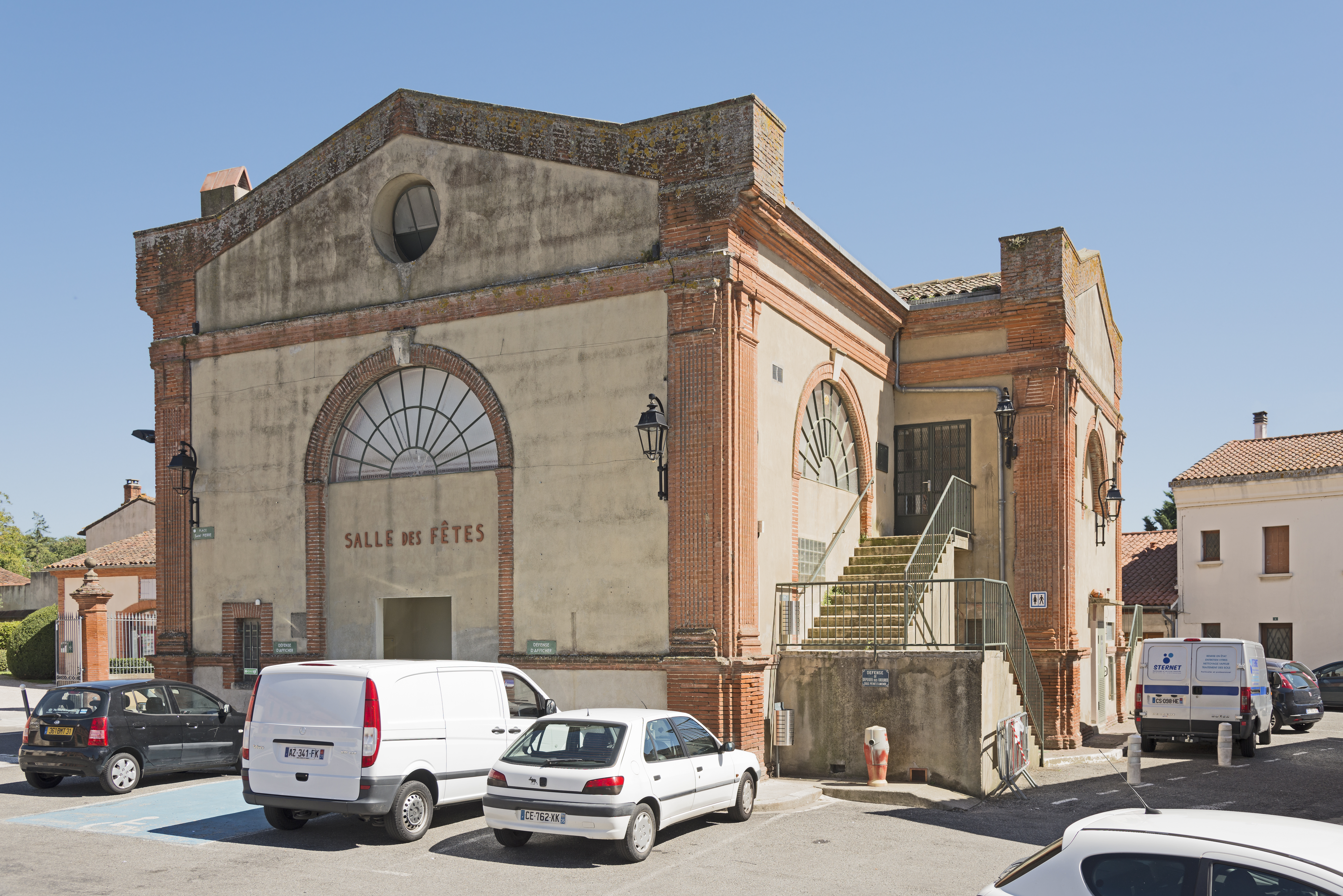
The village hall.

== Personalities ==
- Jean-Baptiste Noulet

== See also ==
- Communes of the Haute-Garonne department
