= Roques, Haute-Garonne =

Roques
- Commune
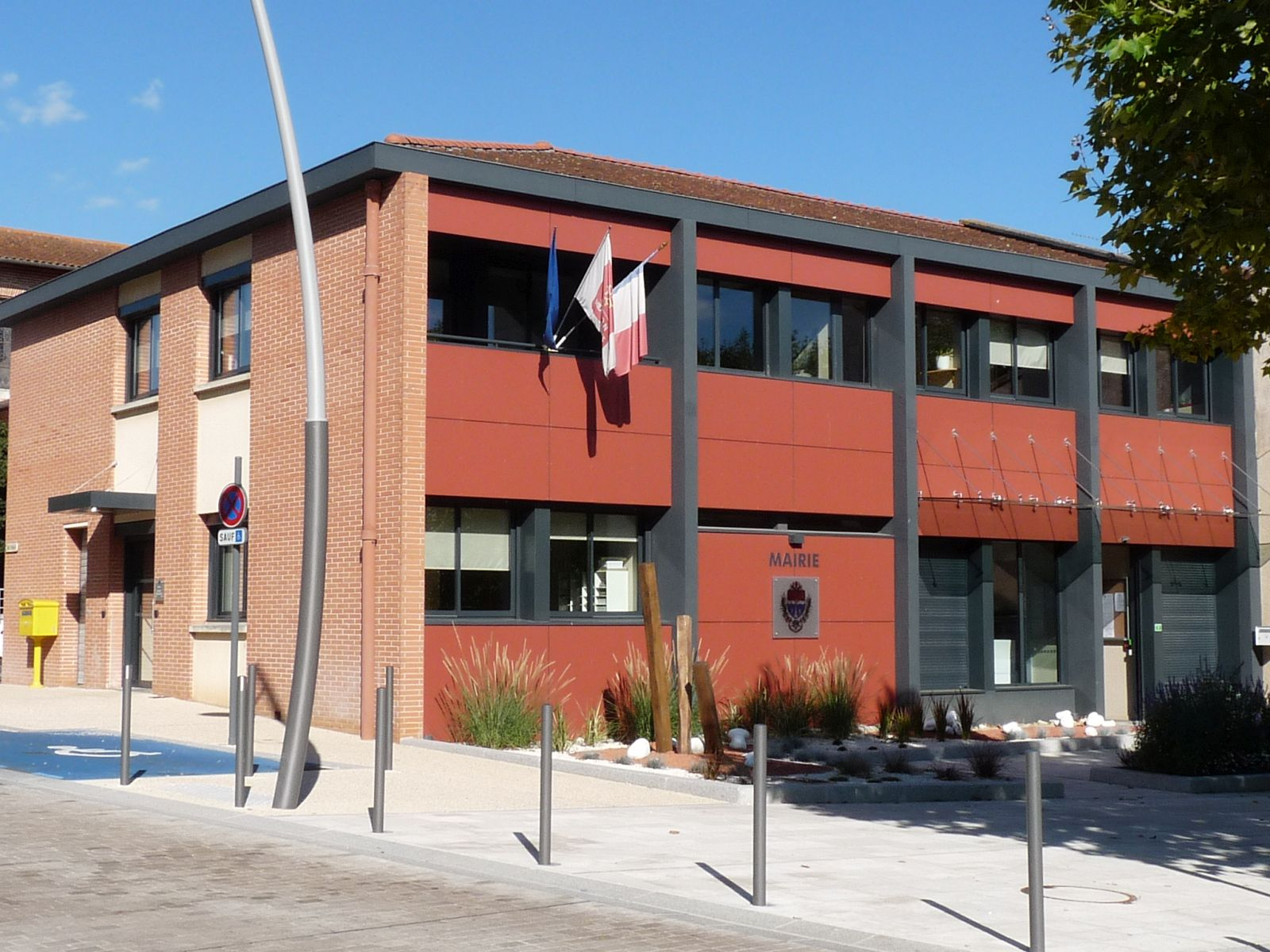
- The town hall in Roques

- Coat of arms
- Location of Roques
- Location within France Location within Occitanie
- Coordinates: 43°30′41″N 1°22′38″E
- Country: France
- Region: Occitania
- Department: Haute-Garonne
- Arrondissement: Muret
- Canton: Portet-sur-Garonne
- Intercommunality: Le Muretain Agglo

Government
  - Mayor (2020–2026): Sylvain Mabire
- Area^{1}: 9.3 km^{2} (3.6 sq mi)
- Elevation: 157 m (515 ft)
- Highest elevation: 164 m (538 ft)
- Lowest elevation: 148 m (486 ft)
- Population (2023): 5,436
  - Density: 580/km^{2} (1,500/sq mi)
- Time zone: UTC+01:00 (CET)
  - Summer (DST): UTC+02:00 (CEST)
- INSEE/Postal code: 31458 /31120
- ^{1} French Land Register data, which excludes lakes, ponds, glaciers > 1 km^{2} (0.386 sq mi or 247 acres) and river estuaries.

Roques (French pronunciation: [ʁɔk]; Occitan: Ròcas de Garona) is a commune in Haute-Garonne, a department in southwestern France.

== Population ==
The inhabitants of the commune are known as Roquois and Roquoises in French.

Historical population
Year	Pop.	±% p.a.
1968	1,086	—
1975	1,302	+2.63%
1982	2,151	+7.44%
1990	2,662	+2.70%
1999	2,988	+1.29%
2007	3,729	+2.81%
2012	4,087	+1.85%
2017	4,550	+2.17%
2023	5,436	+3.01%
Source: INSEE

== See also ==
- Communes of the Haute-Garonne department
