= Alfred Mayssonnié =

France international rugby union player

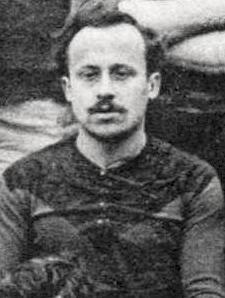
- Mayssonnié in 1908
- Born: Xavier Adrien Alfred Mayssonnié; 10 February 1884 Lavernose-Lacasse, France
- Died: 6 September 1914 (aged 30) Near Osches, France
- Height: 1.68 m (5 ft 6 in)
- Weight: 70 kg (11 st 0 lb)

Rugby union career
Senior career
Years	Team	Apps	(Points)
- Stade Toulousain
International career
Years	Team	Apps	(Points)
1908-1910	France	3	(0)

Alfred Mayssonnié (10 February 1884 – 6 September 1914), nicknamed Maysso, was a French rugby union player who appeared three times for the country's national team, and was also the first rugby international from any country to die in action in World War I. A native of Lavernose, a village near Toulouse, he played as scrum-half and fly-half and is credited to this day by Stade Toulousain as the strategist of the club's first great teams in the early 20th century.

== Rugby career ==
Unlike most French players of his era, he did not have a professional occupation; he was instead an employee in a business run by his family. Paul Voivenel, who became a prominent rugby administrator and played a major role in keeping Mayssonnié's memory alive, recalled him as "a slight, unmuscular figure, an honest workman with the air of a teacher or public servant."

Mayssonnié is believed to be the first player to be selected for the France national team while playing for Toulouse. (Note: The club claims Augustin Pujol, a member of the first-ever France national squad in 1906, as its first French international. However, rugby historians in both France and the UK have concluded that Pujol was playing for Stade Français at that time, and did not move to Toulouse until after Maysonnié had made his first France appearance.) Although he appeared only three times for France, he was nonetheless involved in two historic matches. His first appearance, in 1908 against England, was France's first match at Colombes, which would remain the national team's primary home until the opening of Parc des Princes in the 1970s. His final match in 1910, against Wales, was the first in the Five Nations era (i.e., involving France, England, Ireland, Scotland and Wales) of the competition now known as the Six Nations Championship.

He had a more successful career at club level, winning four national championships with three lower-level Toulouse teams in six seasons. (In his day, France held championships at several different levels, with major clubs such as Toulouse fielding teams at multiple levels.) The crowning moment of his club career came in 1912, when he started as fly-half for the Toulouse first team in the championship final against Racing Club de France due to an injury. With Toulouse trailing 6–0 early in the second half, Mayssonnié scored the try that swung the momentum toward Toulouse, which went on to score a second try and win the first of their many titles.

== Military service and death ==
Mayssonnié volunteered for service once World War I broke out, and was appointed a non-commissioned infantry officer. Within three weeks, he was cited for bravery in an action near Verdun. He died in action at the Battle of the Marne, making him the first of over 100 rugby internationals, including 23 of the 112 pre-war France internationals, to die during World War I. According to rugby historian Huw Richards, "His body might, like those of many war victims, have been lost but for his former Toulouse and France team-mate Pierre Mounicq, who buried it while under enemy fire." Two days later, a group of five men that included Voivenel marked his grave; after the war, his remains were exhumed, returned to Lavernose, and reinterred in the local churchyard.

He is honored every 11 November, thanks to a stele bearing his image affixed to the monument to the dead Herakles Archer Toulouse.

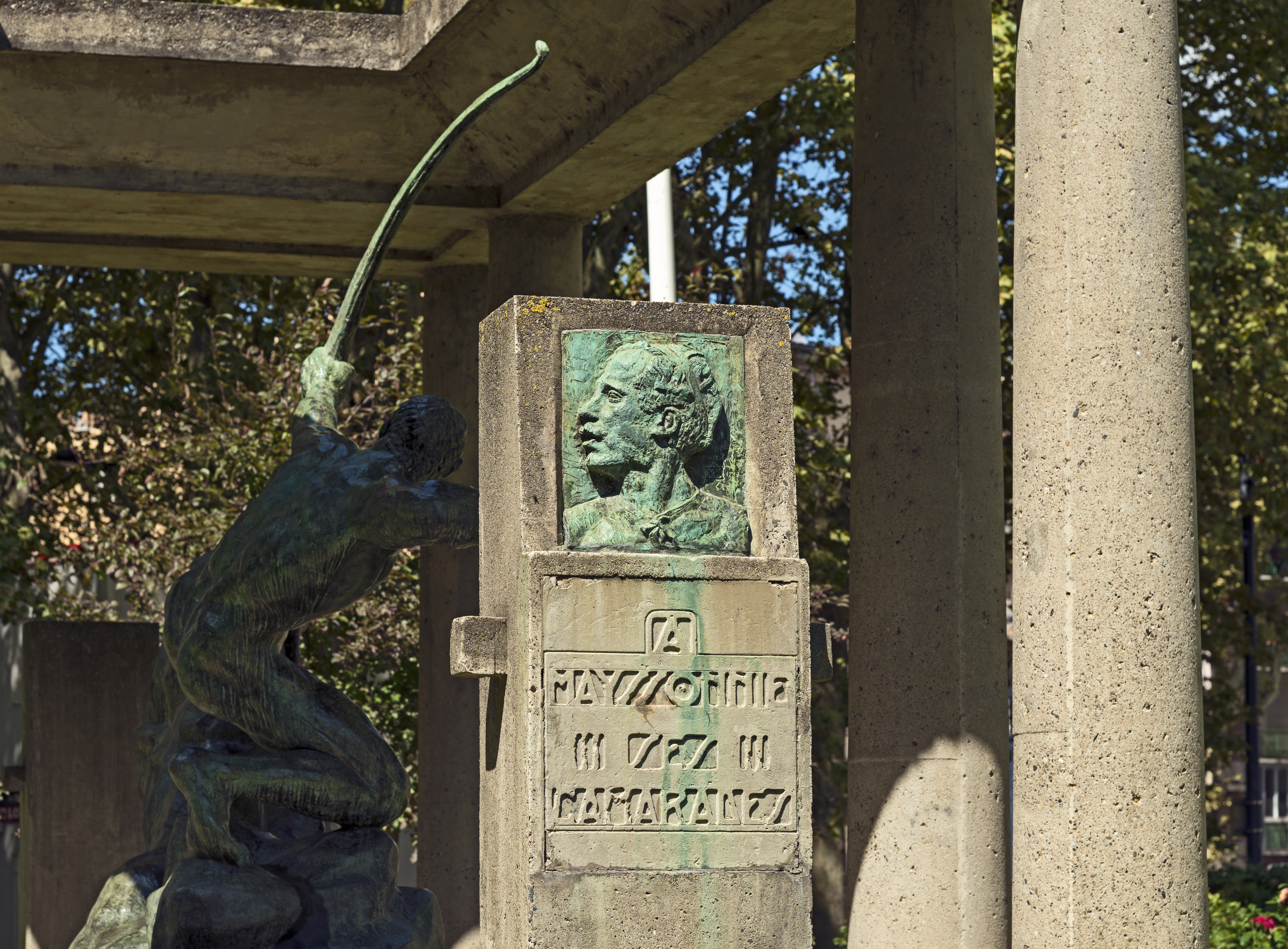
Monument to the memory of Alfred Mayssonnié, Toulouse, by Antoine Bourdelle

== History ==
- 3 caps for France, from 1908 to 1910.
- The only player in Toulouse in the first match of the French Five Nations team in 1910.
- Champion of France (and the Pyrenees) in 1912
- Champion of France with the second, third and fourth teams of Stade Toulousain.
