= Saint-Clar-de-Rivière =

- Commune
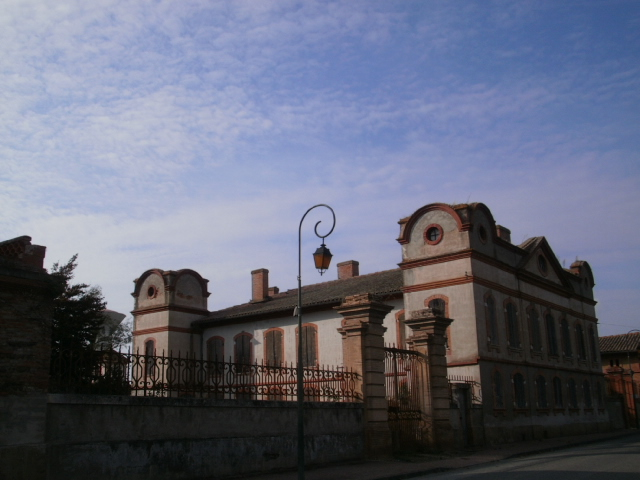
- The chateau in Saint-Clar-de-Rivière

- Coat of arms
- Location of Saint-Clar-de-Rivière
- Location within France Location within Occitanie
- Coordinates: 43°28′02″N 1°12′57″E
- Country: France
- Region: Occitania
- Department: Haute-Garonne
- Arrondissement: Muret
- Canton: Muret
- Intercommunality: Le Muretain Agglo

Government
  - Mayor (2020–2026): Étienne Gasquet
- Area^{1}: 10.07 km^{2} (3.89 sq mi)
- Elevation: 225 m (738 ft)
- Highest elevation: 228 m (748 ft)
- Lowest elevation: 181 m (594 ft)
- Population (2023): 1,720
  - Density: 171/km^{2} (442/sq mi)
- Time zone: UTC+01:00 (CET)
  - Summer (DST): UTC+02:00 (CEST)
- INSEE/Postal code: 31475 /31600
- ^{1} French Land Register data, which excludes lakes, ponds, glaciers > 1 km^{2} (0.386 sq mi or 247 acres) and river estuaries.

Saint-Clar-de-Rivière (French pronunciation: [sɛ̃ klaʁ də ʁivjɛʁ]; Occitan: Sent Clar de Ribèra) is a commune in the Haute-Garonne department in southwestern France.

== Population ==
Historical population
Year	Pop.	±% p.a.
1968	350	—
1975	503	+5.32%
1982	585	+2.18%
1990	743	+3.03%
1999	872	+1.79%
2007	1,148	+3.50%
2012	1,162	+0.24%
2017	1,338	+2.86%
2023	1,720	+4.27%
Source: INSEE

== See also ==
- Communes of the Haute-Garonne department
