= Jean-Baptiste Noulet =

French scientist and naturalist (1802–1890)

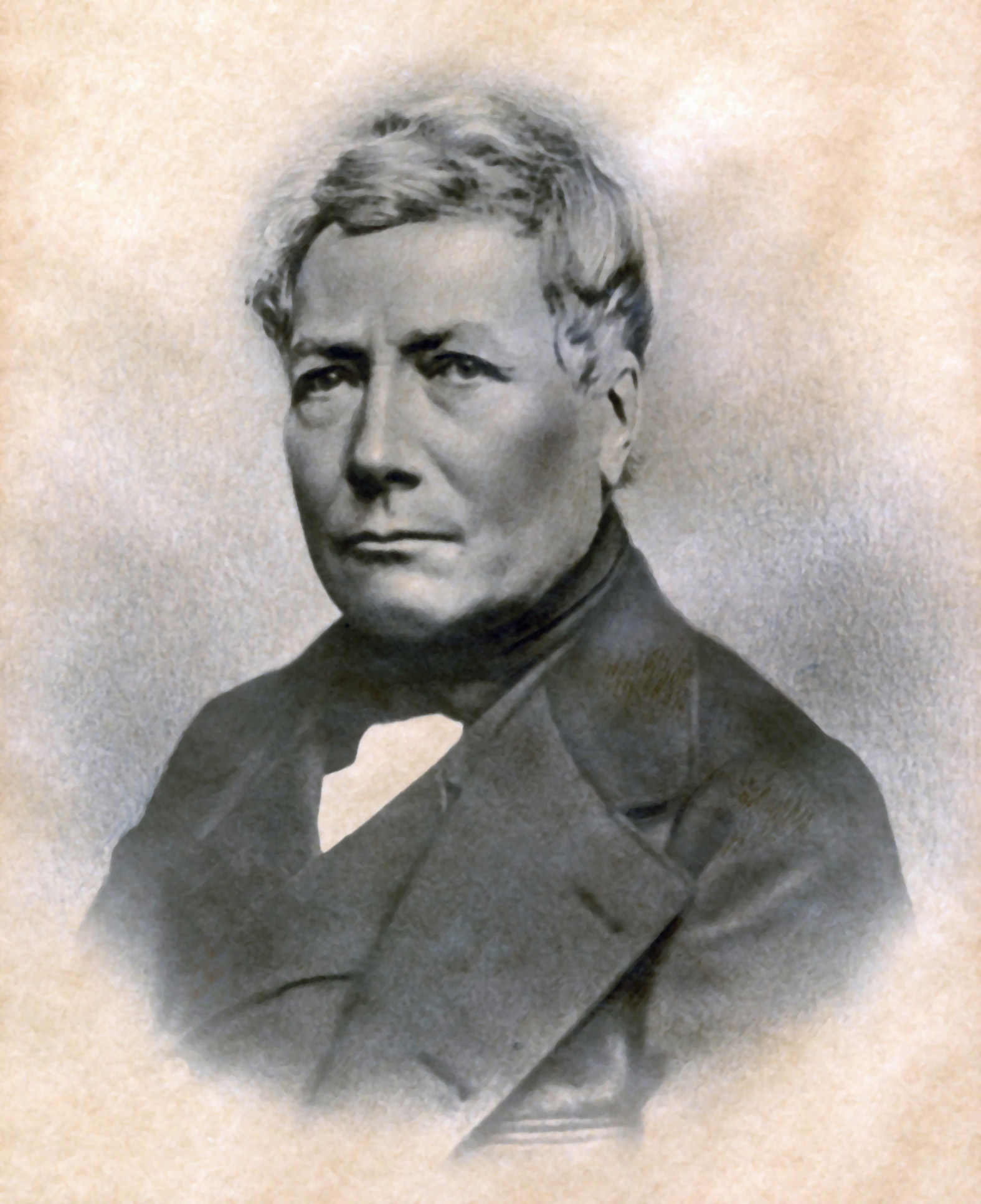
- Born: 1 May 1802; Venerque, Haute-Garonne, France
- Died: 25 May 1890 (aged 88)
- Education: University of Montpellier
- Known for: La Flore du Bassin sous-pyrénéen (1837)
- Scientific career
- Fields: Archaeology, malacoloy, botany, philology
- Institutions: Natural History Museum of Toulouse
- Thesis: (1832)
- Author abbrev. (botany): Noulet

Jean-Baptiste Noulet (1 May 1802 – 24 May 1890) was a French scientist and naturalist who helped to prove the archaeological existence of humans and was one of the pioneers of the scientific discipline of prehistoric archaeology. He was born in Venerque.

Having obtained his doctorate in medicine at Montpellier in 1832, Noulet focused his research on Occitania and latterly on the Occitan language. In 1841, he was appointed chair of medical natural history at the preparatory school of medicine and pharmacy in Toulouse. Noulet served as the director of the Natural History Museum in Toulouse from 1872, where he founded a gallery devoted to prehistory.

In the field of malacology, he issued an analytical study on the natural history of fluvial and terrestrial mollusks native to the sub-Pyrenean basin (1834). As a botanist, he published an exhaustive volume (754 pages) on regional plants of the sub-Pyrenees, La Flore du Bassin sous-pyrénéen (1837).

Polished ax at the Museum of Toulouse, (formerly part of a collection of Jean-Baptiste Noulet)

In 1851, at Clermont-le-Fort, he discovered the remains of Pleistocene fauna, along with the presence of lithic artifacts, findings that seemingly proved the co-existence of Pleistocene animals with humans, and in essence, confirmed ideas that were earlier proposed by prehistorian Jacques Boucher de Perthes (1788-1868).

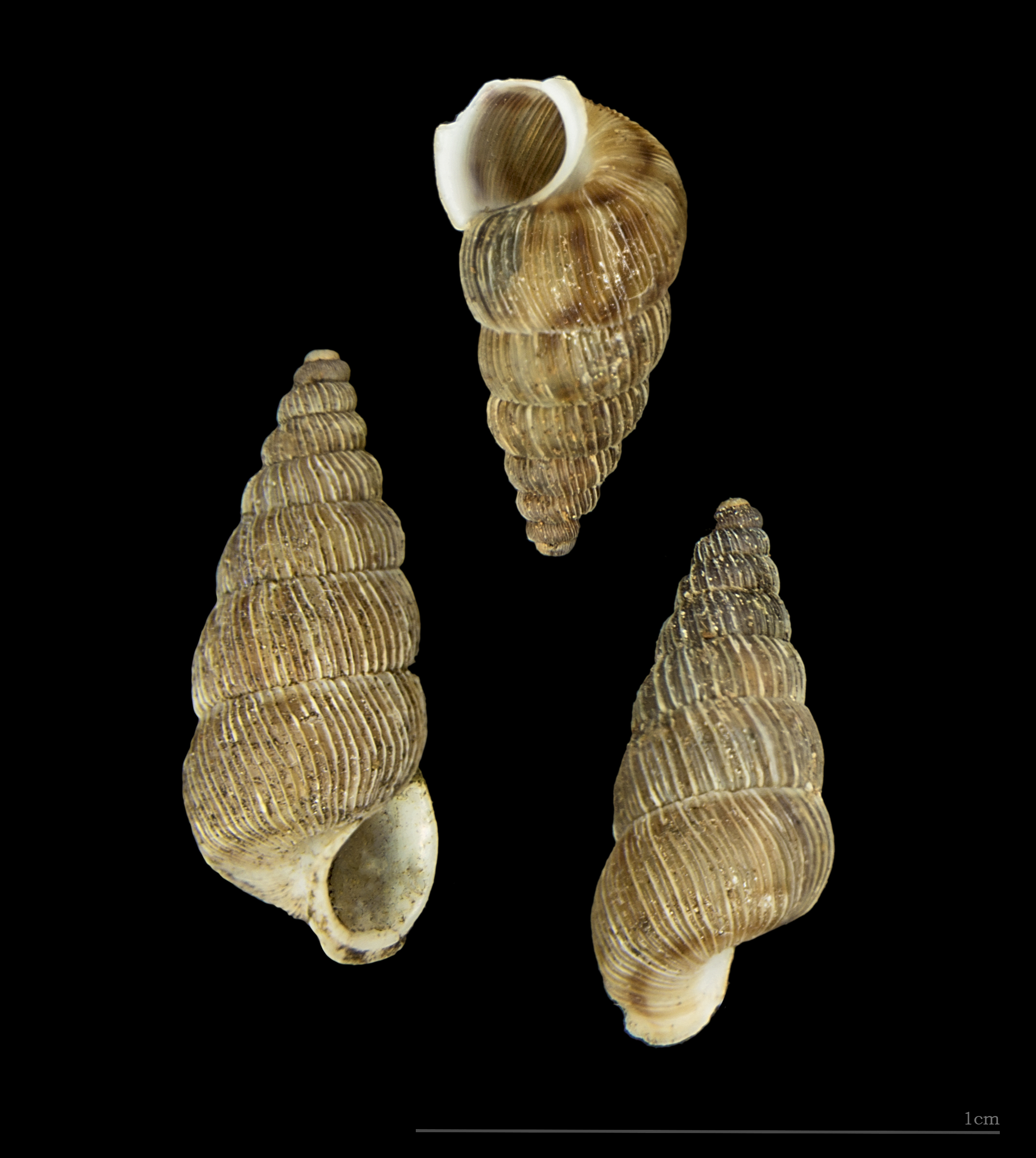
Cochlostoma nouleti

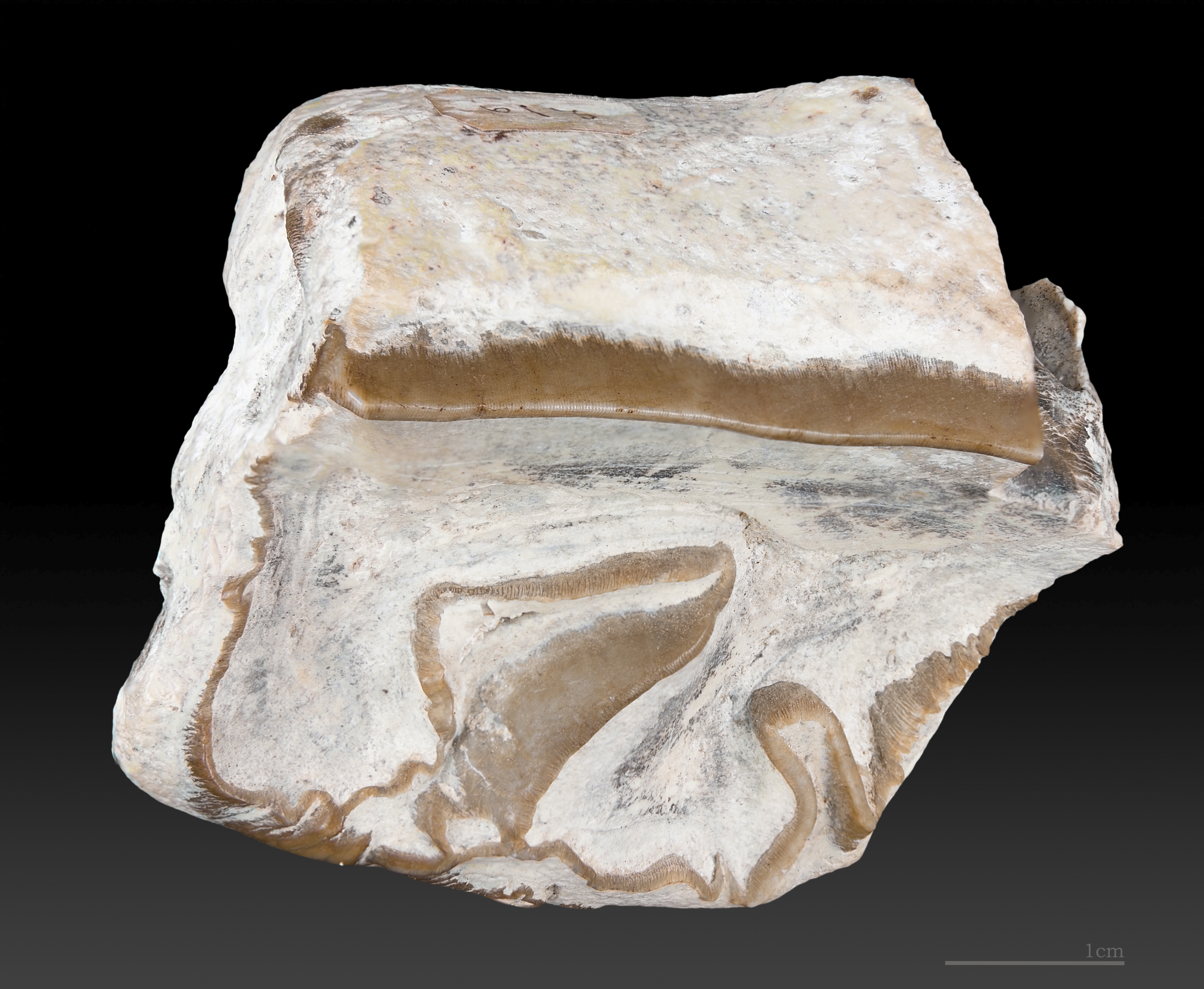
Paratype of Cadurcotherium nouleti
