= Le Fauga =

- Commune
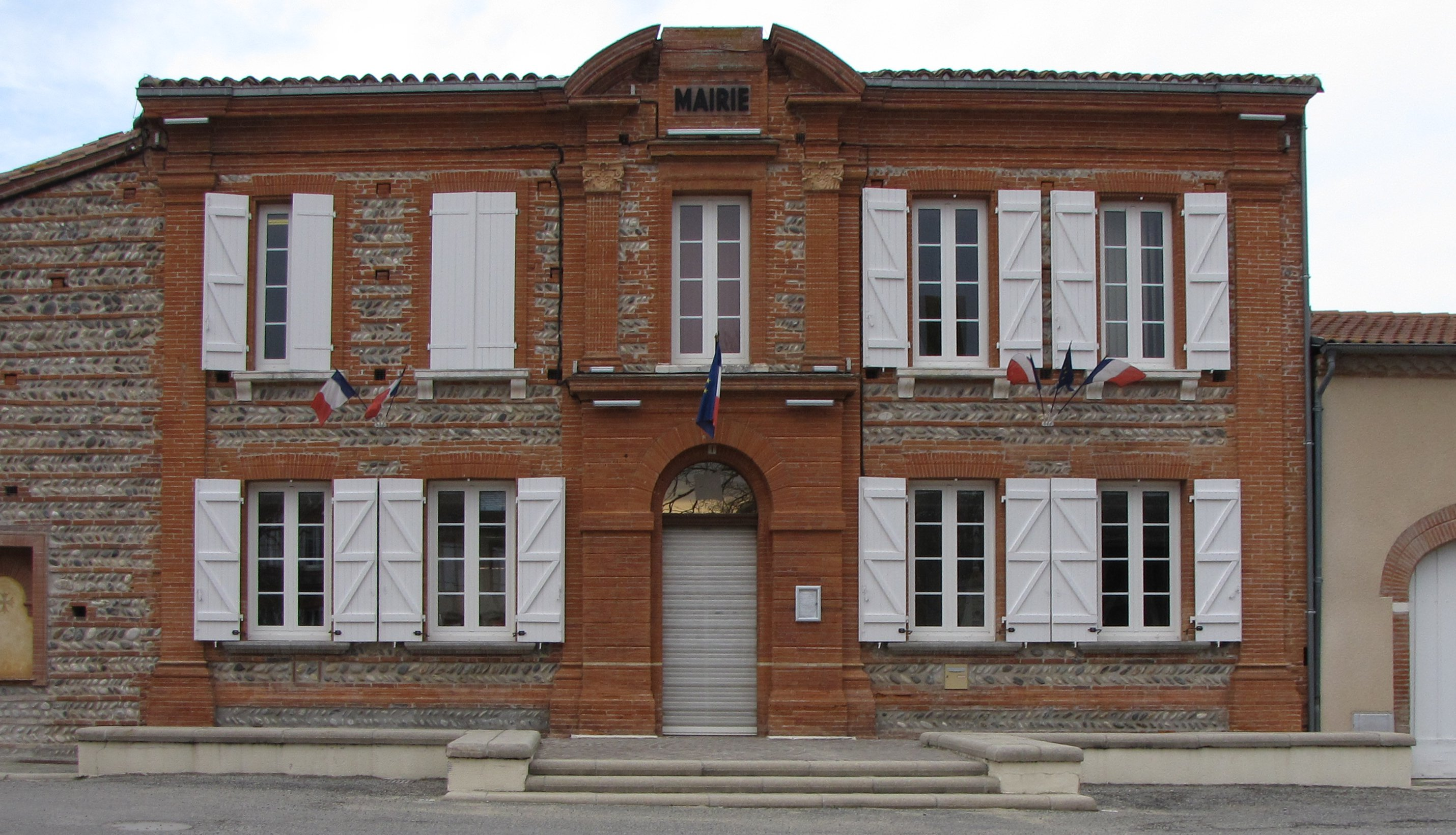
- Town hall

- Coat of arms
- Location of Le Fauga
- Location within France Location within Occitanie
- Coordinates: 43°23′51″N 1°17′41″E
- Country: France
- Region: Occitania
- Department: Haute-Garonne
- Arrondissement: Muret
- Canton: Muret
- Intercommunality: Le Muretain Agglo

Government
  - Mayor (2020–2026): Jean-Marie Puig
- Area^{1}: 8.92 km^{2} (3.44 sq mi)
- Elevation: 186 m (610 ft)
- Highest elevation: 282 m (925 ft)
- Lowest elevation: 165 m (541 ft)
- Population (2023): 2,603
  - Density: 292/km^{2} (756/sq mi)
- Time zone: UTC+01:00 (CET)
  - Summer (DST): UTC+02:00 (CEST)
- INSEE/Postal code: 31181 /31410
- ^{1} French Land Register data, which excludes lakes, ponds, glaciers > 1 km^{2} (0.386 sq mi or 247 acres) and river estuaries.

Le Fauga (French pronunciation: [lə foɡa]; Gascon: Le Haugar) is a commune in the Haute-Garonne department in southwestern France.

== Population ==
Historical population
Year	Pop.	±% p.a.
1968	489	—
1975	546	+1.59%
1982	708	+3.78%
1990	889	+2.89%
1999	1,099	+2.38%
2007	1,617	+4.95%
2012	1,839	+2.61%
2017	2,048	+2.18%
2023	2,603	+4.08%
Source: INSEE

== Economy ==
The commune once had the headquarters of Air Méditerranée.

== Transport ==
Le Fauga station is on the railway line from Toulouse to Pau.

== See also ==
- Communes of the Haute-Garonne department
