= Bonrepos-sur-Aussonnelle =

- Commune
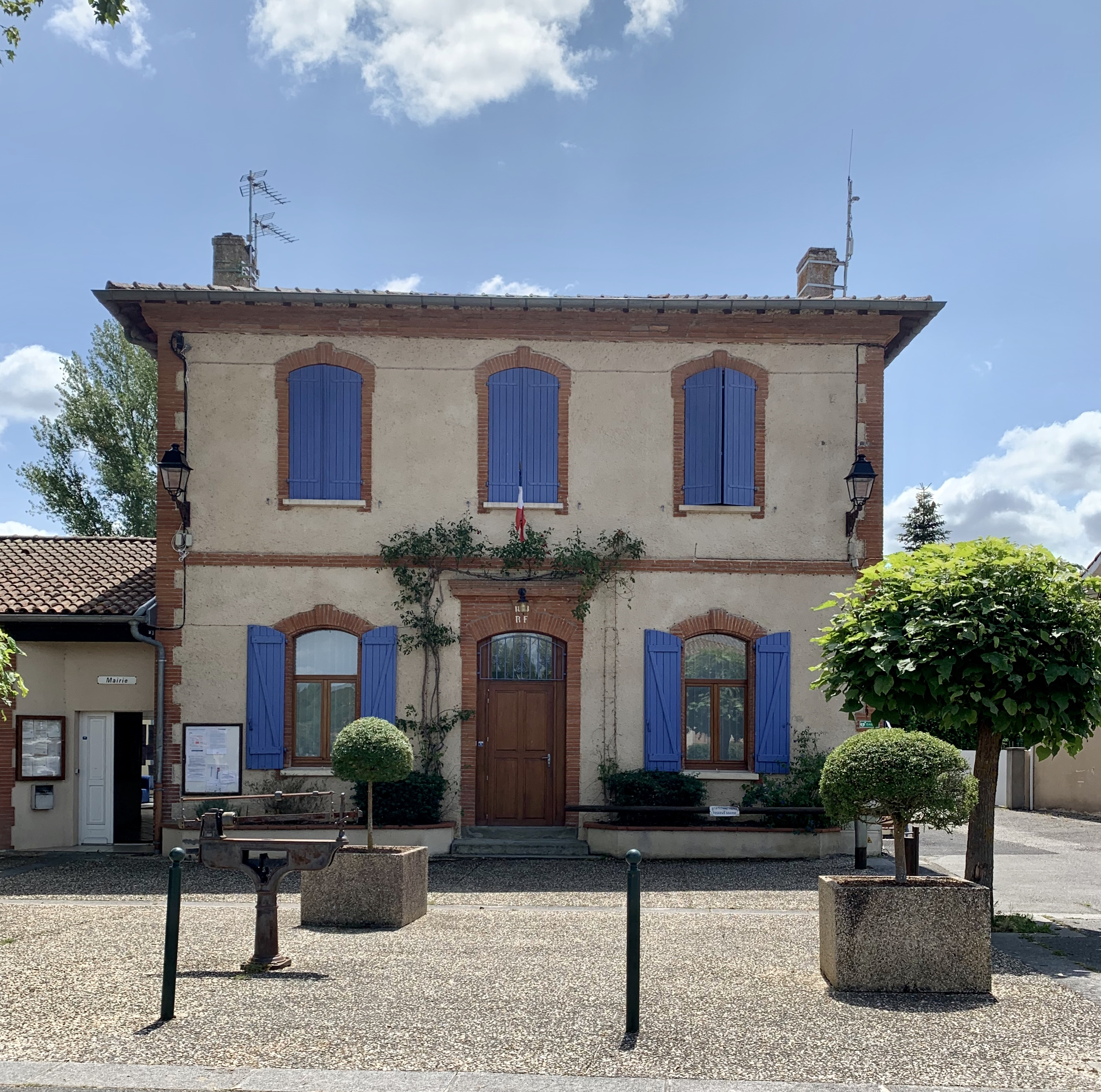
- The town hall in Bonrepos-sur-Aussonnelle

- Coat of arms
- Location of Bonrepos-sur-Aussonnelle
- Location within France Location within Occitanie
- Coordinates: 43°32′48″N 1°08′59″E
- Country: France
- Region: Occitania
- Department: Haute-Garonne
- Arrondissement: Muret
- Canton: Plaisance-du-Touch
- Intercommunality: Le Muretain Agglo

Government
  - Mayor (2020–2026): Thierry Chebelin
- Area^{1}: 10.17 km^{2} (3.93 sq mi)
- Highest elevation: 312 m (1,024 ft)
- Lowest elevation: 206 m (676 ft)
- Population (2023): 1,241
  - Density: 122.0/km^{2} (316.0/sq mi)
- Time zone: UTC+01:00 (CET)
  - Summer (DST): UTC+02:00 (CEST)
- INSEE/Postal code: 31075 /31470
- ^{1} French Land Register data, which excludes lakes, ponds, glaciers > 1 km^{2} (0.386 sq mi or 247 acres) and river estuaries.

Bonrepos-sur-Aussonnelle is a commune of the Haute-Garonne department in southwestern France.

== Population ==
Historical population
Year	Pop.	±% p.a.
1968	162	—
1975	193	+2.53%
1982	319	+7.44%
1990	510	+6.04%
1999	579	+1.42%
2007	788	+3.93%
2012	983	+4.52%
2017	1,187	+3.84%
2023	1,241	+0.74%
Source: INSEE

The inhabitants of the commune are known as Bonreposiens in French.

== See also ==
- Communes of the Haute-Garonne department
