= Fontenilles =

- Commune
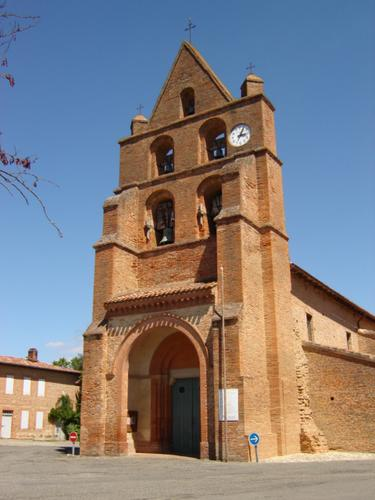
- The church in Fontenilles

- Coat of arms
- Location of Fontenilles
- Location within France Location within Occitanie
- Coordinates: 43°33′14″N 1°11′30″E
- Country: France
- Region: Occitania
- Department: Haute-Garonne
- Arrondissement: Muret
- Canton: Plaisance-du-Touch
- Intercommunality: CC Le Grand Ouest Toulousain

Government
  - Mayor (2020–2026): Christophe Tountevich
- Area^{1}: 20.22 km^{2} (7.81 sq mi)
- Elevation: 200 m (660 ft)
- Highest elevation: 280 m (920 ft)
- Lowest elevation: 174 m (571 ft)
- Population (2023): 5,906
  - Density: 292.1/km^{2} (756.5/sq mi)
- Time zone: UTC+01:00 (CET)
  - Summer (DST): UTC+02:00 (CEST)
- INSEE/Postal code: 31188 /31470
- ^{1} French Land Register data, which excludes lakes, ponds, glaciers > 1 km^{2} (0.386 sq mi or 247 acres) and river estuaries.

Fontenilles (French pronunciation: [fɔ̃tnij]; Occitan: Fontanilhas) is a commune in the Haute-Garonne department in southwestern France.

== Population ==
The inhabitants of Fontenilles are known as Fontenillois in French.

Historical population
Year	Pop.	±% p.a.
1968	528	—
1975	1,215	+12.64%
1982	1,791	+5.70%
1990	2,262	+2.96%
1999	2,920	+2.88%
2007	3,580	+2.58%
2012	5,011	+6.96%
2017	5,935	+3.44%
2023	5,906	−0.08%
Source: INSEE

== See also ==
- Communes of the Haute-Garonne department
