= Le Fauga station =

Railway station in Le Fauga, France

Le Fauga
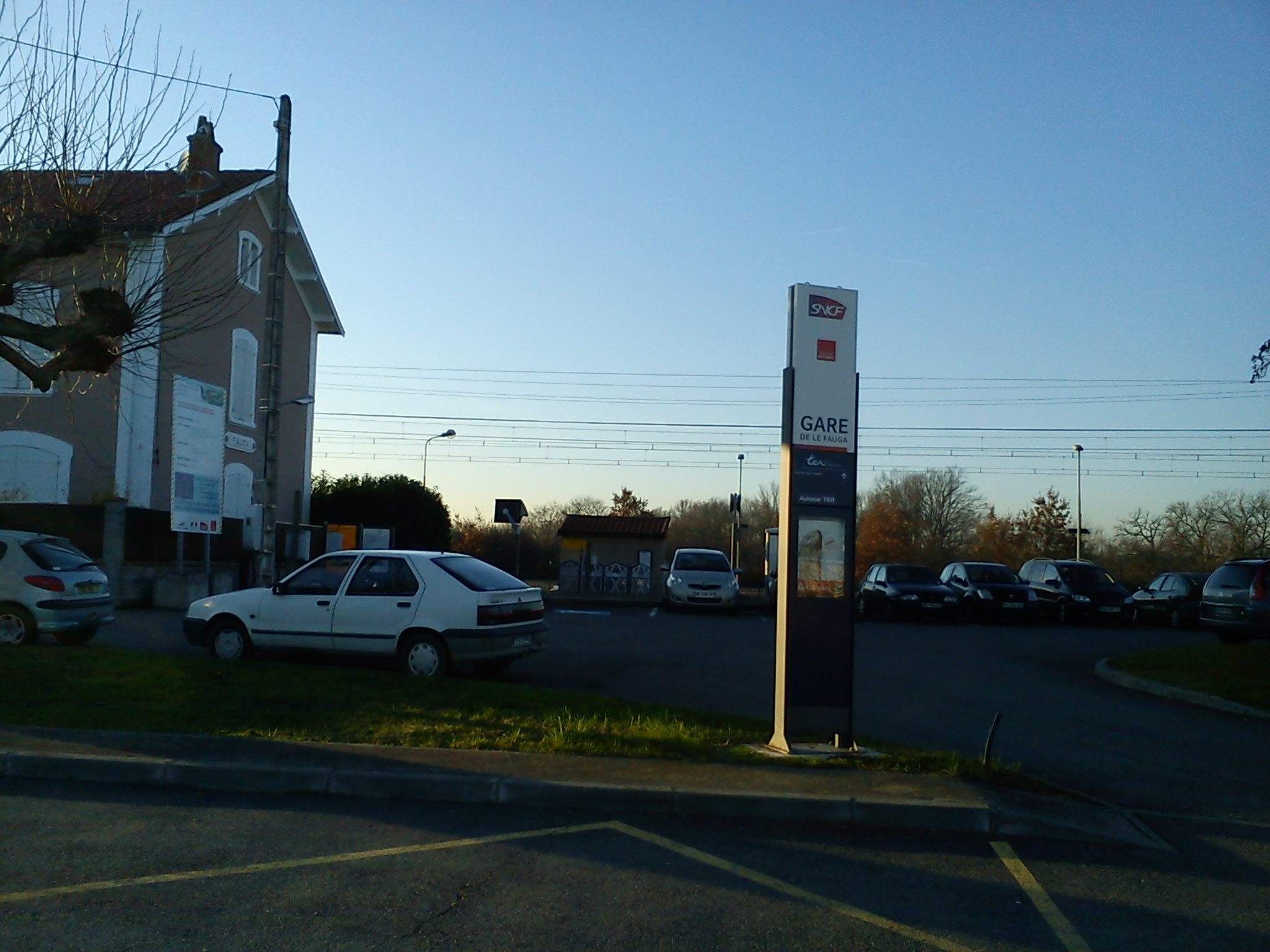
- Le Fauga railway station

General information
- Location: Le Fauga, Haute-Garonne, Occitanie, France
- Coordinates: 43°24′14″N 1°16′57″E
- Line: Toulouse–Bayonne railway
- Platforms: 2
- Tracks: 2

Other information
- Station code: 87611046

History
- Opened: 9 June 1862

Services
Preceding station	TER Occitanie	Following station
Longages–Noé towards Pau	15	Muret towards Toulouse
Location

Le Fauga is a railway station in Le Fauga, Occitanie, France. The station is on the Toulouse–Bayonne railway line. The station is served by TER (local) services operated by the SNCF.

== Train services ==
The following services currently call at Le Fauga:

- local service (TER Occitanie) Toulouse–Saint-Gaudens–Tarbes–Pau
