= Saint-Thomas, Haute-Garonne =

Saint-Thomas Sent Tomàs (Occitan)
- Commune
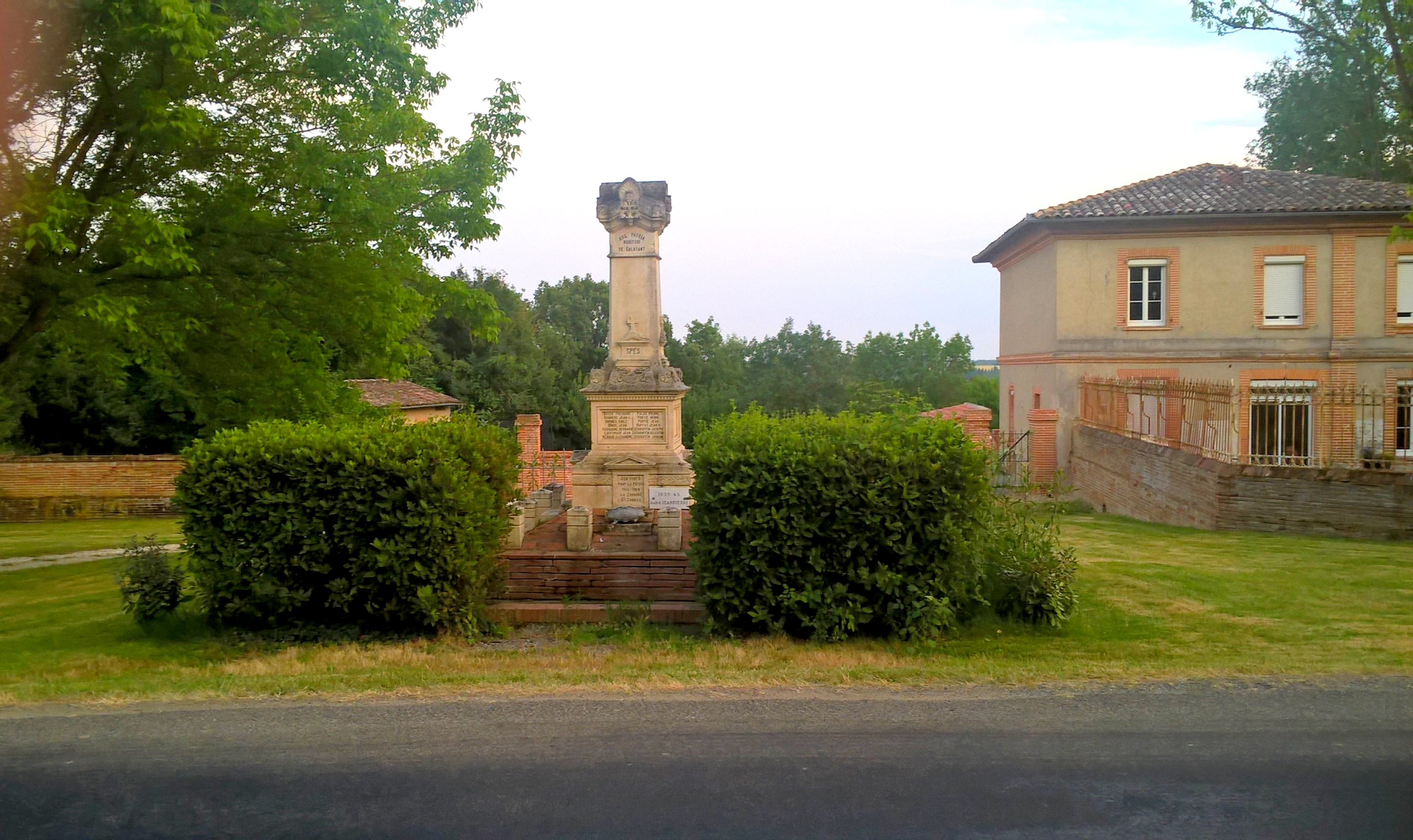
- The war memorial in Saint-Thomas

- Coat of arms
- Location of Saint-Thomas
- Location within France Location within Occitanie
- Coordinates: 43°30′55″N 1°04′59″E
- Country: France
- Region: Occitania
- Department: Haute-Garonne
- Arrondissement: Muret
- Canton: Plaisance-du-Touch
- Intercommunality: Le Muretain Agglo

Government
  - Mayor (2020–2026): Alain Palas
- Area^{1}: 14.01 km^{2} (5.41 sq mi)
- Elevation: 320 m (1,050 ft)
- Highest elevation: 315 m (1,033 ft)
- Lowest elevation: 185 m (607 ft)
- Population (2023): 627
  - Density: 44.8/km^{2} (116/sq mi)
- Time zone: UTC+01:00 (CET)
  - Summer (DST): UTC+02:00 (CEST)
- INSEE/Postal code: 31518 /31470
- ^{1} French Land Register data, which excludes lakes, ponds, glaciers > 1 km^{2} (0.386 sq mi or 247 acres) and river estuaries.

Saint-Thomas (French pronunciation: [sɛ̃ tɔmɑ]; Gascon: Sent Tomàs) is a commune in the Haute-Garonne department in southwestern France.

== Population ==
Historical population
Year	Pop.	±% p.a.
1968	227	—
1975	267	+2.35%
1982	287	+1.04%
1990	362	+2.94%
1999	472	+2.99%
2007	555	+2.05%
2012	558	+0.11%
2017	573	+0.53%
2023	627	+1.51%
Source: INSEE

The inhabitants of the commune are known as Saint-Thomasains in French.

== See also ==
- Communes of the Haute-Garonne department
