= Saint-Lys =

- Commune
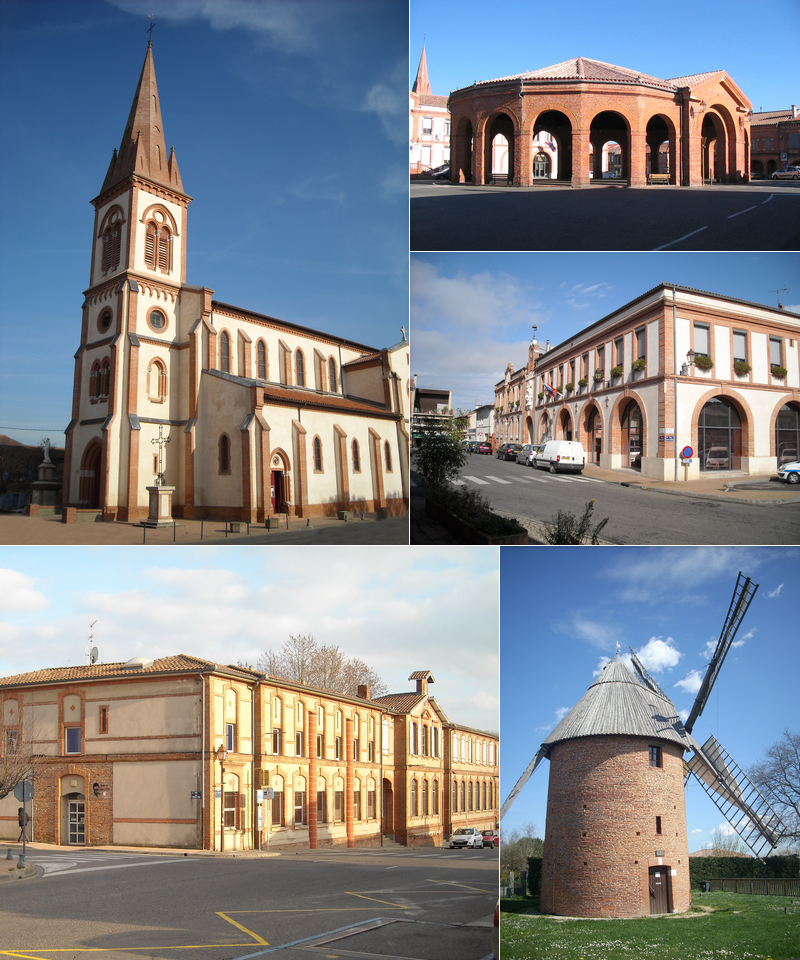
- Clockwise of Saint-Lys: The church, market hall, city hall, multimedia library and the windmill.

- Coat of arms
- Location of Saint-Lys
- Location within France Location within Occitanie
- Coordinates: 43°30′54″N 1°10′42″E
- Country: France
- Region: Occitania
- Department: Haute-Garonne
- Arrondissement: Muret
- Canton: Plaisance-du-Touch
- Intercommunality: Le Muretain Agglo

Government
  - Mayor (2020–2026): Serge Deuilhé
- Area^{1}: 21.3 km^{2} (8.2 sq mi)
- Elevation: 209 m (686 ft)
- Highest elevation: 220 m (720 ft)
- Lowest elevation: 175 m (574 ft)
- Population (2023): 9,892
  - Density: 464/km^{2} (1,200/sq mi)
- Time zone: UTC+01:00 (CET)
  - Summer (DST): UTC+02:00 (CEST)
- INSEE/Postal code: 31499 /31470
- ^{1} French Land Register data, which excludes lakes, ponds, glaciers > 1 km^{2} (0.386 sq mi or 247 acres) and river estuaries.

Saint-Lys (French pronunciation: [sɛ̃ lis]; Sent Lis in gascon occitan) is a commune in the Haute-Garonne department in southwestern France.

== Population ==
The inhabitants of Saint-Lys are known as Saint-Lysiens in French.

Historical population

Year	Pop.	±% p.a.
1793	916	—
1800	998	+1.23%
1806	1,047	+0.80%
1821	1,209	+0.96%
1831	1,223	+0.12%
1836	1,223	+0.00%
1841	1,293	+1.12%
1846	1,416	+1.83%
1851	1,445	+0.41%
1856	1,471	+0.36%
1861	1,533	+0.83%
1866	1,569	+0.47%
1872	1,451	−1.29%
1876	1,443	−0.14%
1881	1,491	+0.66%
1886	1,483	−0.11%
1891	1,343	−1.96%
1896	1,245	−1.50%
1901	1,283	+0.60%

Year	Pop.	±% p.a.
1906	1,188	−1.53%
1911	1,116	−1.24%
1921	998	−1.11%
1926	1,053	+1.08%
1931	1,024	−0.56%
1936	1,040	+0.31%
1946	1,007	−0.32%
1954	1,238	+2.62%
1962	1,426	+1.78%
1968	1,794	+3.90%
1975	2,820	+6.67%
1982	3,503	+3.15%
1990	4,565	+3.37%
1999	5,455	+2.00%
2007	8,118	+5.09%
2012	8,755	+1.52%
2017	9,470	+1.58%
2023	9,892	+0.73%

Source: EHESS and INSEE (1968-2023)

== See also ==
- Communes of the Haute-Garonne department
