= Muret – Lherm Aerodrome =

Muret - Lherm Aerodrome Aérodrome de Muret-Lherm
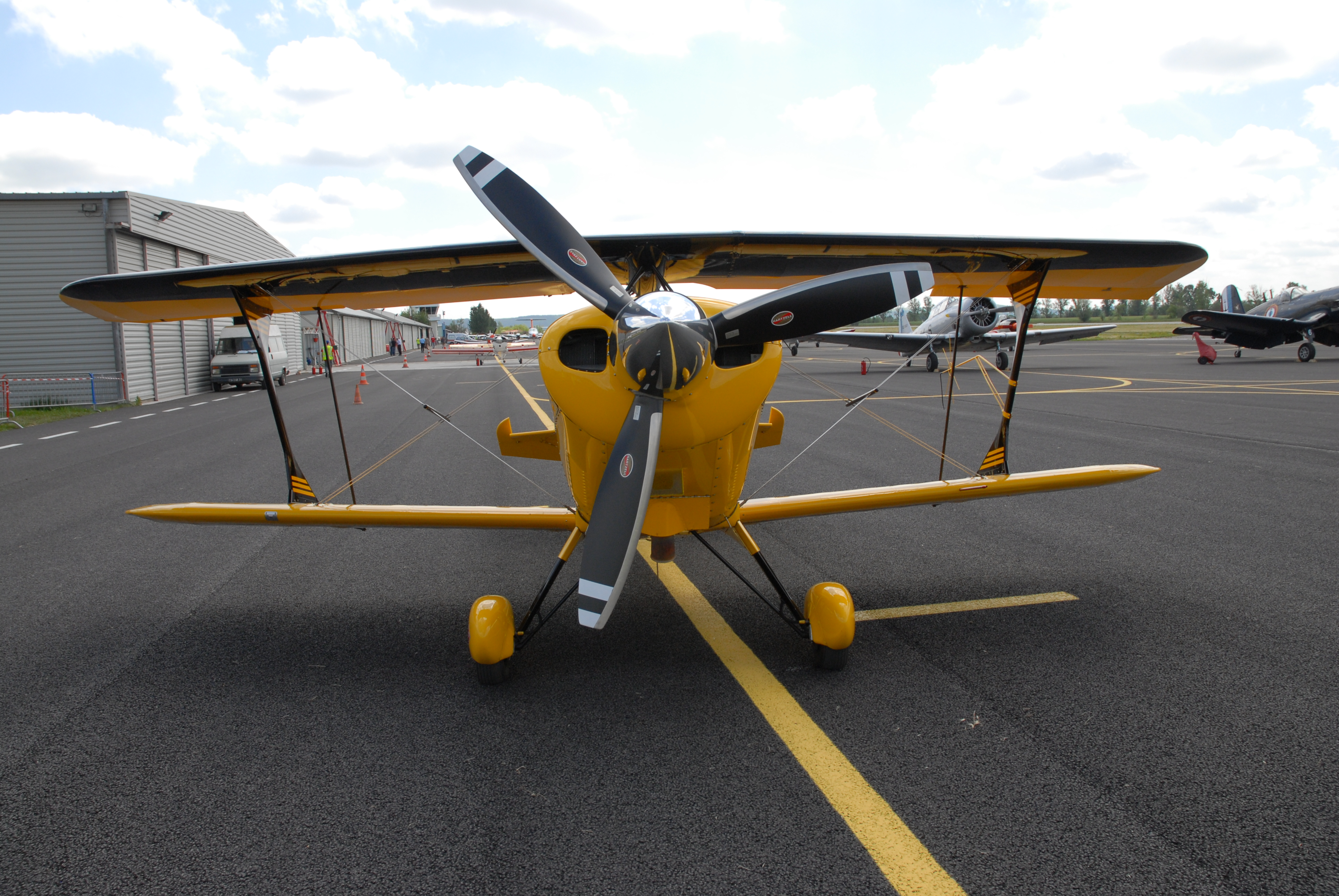
- IATA: none; ICAO: LFBR

Summary
- Airport type: Public
- Serves: Muret, France
- Location: Lherm, France
- Elevation AMSL: 622 ft / 189 m
- Coordinates: 43°26′58.844″N 001°15′49.266″E

Map
- Location of airport in France

Runways
Direction	Length		Surface
Direction	ft	m	Surface
12/30	3,609	1,100	Asphalt
12/30	2,706	825	Grass
- Source: French AIP

Muret – Lherm Aerodrome (ICAO: LFBR) is located at Lherm in Haute-Garonne département in Occitanie region at 5 km south-west of Muret.

A campus of the École nationale de l'aviation civile (French civil aviation university) is located on the aerodrome.

Every year, in May, the airfield welcomes the air show Airexpo.

== Specifications ==
- Airfield elevation : 189 meters
- Asphalt runway : 1 100 m × 30 m
- Grass runway : 825 m × 50 m

== Air show ==
- Airexpo, yearly air show
