= Airexpo =

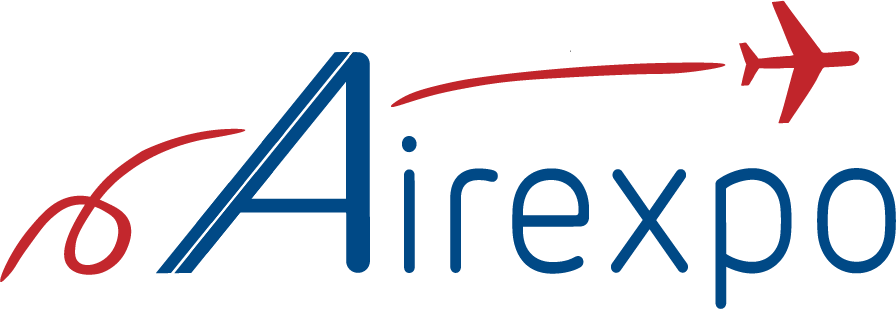
- Genre: Commercial airshow
- Dates: May 11, 2024
- Frequency: Annually
- Venue: Muret - Lherm Aerodrome
- Location: Muret
- Coordinates: 43.449803°N 1.262799°E
- Country: France
- Established: 1987
- Attendance: 20 000 (2022)
- Major events: Aerobatic displays Static displays
- Organizer: ENAC and Institut supérieur de l'aéronautique et de l'espace
- Website: airexpo.org

Airexpo is a French airshow started in 1987. It is the third most important air show of France. It is held annually on the Muret-Lherm aerodrome in the suburban area of Toulouse, a city famous for its aeronautical industry. As the birthplace of many manufacturers, as well as Airbus headquarters. One of the first meetings of the French season, it traditionally takes place in the second half of May.

== Presentation ==
This air show is a unique event in the world as the only air show organized by students. The founding schools were the École nationale supérieure d'ingénieurs de constructions aéronautiques (ENSICA) and École nationale de l'aviation civile (ENAC), both based in Toulouse. A third school, Institut Supérieur de l'Aéronautique et de l'Espace (ISAE-Supaero), joined in later on. Following the merger of ENSICA and ISAE-Supaero, the air show is now organized by the students from ENAC and ISAE-Supaero.

Historically, it was held at Toulouse-Lasbordes aerodrome until the late 1990s. The increasing number of visitors forced the association to move the airshow to Muret-Lherm Aerodrome.

Each year's aircraft line-up is representative of the aeronautical world, including civil aircraft from major manufacturers (Airbus and ATR), military aircraft, helicopters, warbirds, aerobatic aircraft, drones, vintage aircraft and aeromodels.

Light and vintage aviation is represented by aircraft such as the Robin DR-400, the Piper Cub and the Boeing-Stearman Model 75. World War II fighters such as the Supermarine Spitfire and the North American P-51 Mustang are regular exhibitors at Airexpo. Commercial aviation is also represented, with the ATR 72 and aircraft from the Airbus fleet: A340-600, A380, A330neo, A350 XWB and A321-XLR. Military aircraft such as the McDonnell Douglas F/A-18 Hornet, Dassault Mirage 2000, Dassault Rafale and Airbus A400M have already taken part in the show. Airexpo has welcomed numerous aerobatic patrols over the years: the Patrouille de France, the Breitling Jet Team and the Red Arrows.

Air show displays aren't the only activities available on site. Activities such as visits to static aircraft, helicopter christenings, historic military camp re-enactments, stores and stalls of all kinds, flight simulation and virtual reality experiences, and much more are also available, depending on the year and the weather. Refreshment stands and food stalls are of course available every year.

== History ==
=== 16th and 17th editions (2002-2003) ===
The 16th edition welcomed the Patrouille de France 1 June 2002. For the 17th edition, 3 May 2003, the eight Alpha Jets returned.

=== 20th and 21st editions (2006-2007) ===
The 20th edition welcomed over 30,000 visitors on 13 May 2006. The 21st edition of Airexpo took place on 12 May 2007 and attracted over 33,000 people.

=== 22nd edition (2008) ===
The 22nd edition was organized at the Base aérienne 101 Toulouse-Francazal (Francazal airport) on 25 May 2008. The aircraft Douglas DC-3, Noratlas, Dassault Rafale, Airbus A300-600ST Beluga and A380 were at the airshow.

=== 23rd edition (2009) ===
The 23rd edition was organized at the Muret - Lherm Aerodrome on 30 May 2009. The aircraft at the airshow were:

- Dassault/Dornier Alpha Jet,
- Airbus A380,
- ATR 72,
- North American P-51D Mustang,
- Aérospatiale Alouette III.

=== 24th edition (2010) ===
The 24th edition was organized at the Muret - Lherm Aerodrome. More than 30 aircraft were at the airshow, including:

- Airbus A380,
- Airbus Beluga,
- ATR 72 and ATR 42.

Miss France 2010 was also at the air show.

=== 25th edition (2011) ===
The 25th edition took place on 28 May 2011. Twenty flying displays were presented to the public. Presenting at the air show on the occasion of its 25th anniversary were:

- Breitling Jet Team,
- Red Arrows,
- Eurocopter EC175,
- Airbus A400M,
- Airbus A380,
- Curtiss P-40 Warhawk,
- Mitsubishi A6M Zero,
- Extra EA-300,
- Pitts Special.

=== 26th edition (2012) ===
The 26th edition took place on 12 May 2012.

=== 27th edition (2013) ===
The 27th edition took place on 8 June 2013 in Muret-Lherm.

=== 28th edition (2014) ===
The 28th edition took place on May 31, 2014 in Muret-Lherm.

=== 33rd edition (2019) ===
The 33rd edition took place on May 11, 2019 on the airfield of Muret-Lherm.

=== 36th edition (2022) ===
The 36th edition took place on May 14, 2022 at the Muret-Lherm airfield. This edition was the first to take place after two consecutive years without an airshow due to the worldwide COVID-19 pandemic. As a resumption edition, the attendance exceeded all the organization's expectations, for a post lockdown period, with more than 22,000 people in attendance.

The patron of the 2022 edition was Captain Alexandre "POPOV" Orlowski from the French Air Force and the honorary president was the famous French chef Michel Sarran, based in Toulouse.

As a symbol of new beginnings, the association's visual identity was also changed this year.

Displays at the 36th edition included:

- Civilian aircraft
  - Airbus A380
  - Extra 330 (aerobatic display)
  - de Havilland Canada DHC-1 Chipmunk duo
  - Eurocopter EC135 (Emergency Medical Service)
- Military aircraft
  - Patrouille de France (Dassault-Dornier Alpha Jet)
  - Rafale Solo Display (RSD)
  - Rafale Marine duo (Tactical Display)
  - Eurocopter EC145 (Gendarmerie)
- Vintage aircraft and Warbirds:
  - Douglas AD Skyraider
  - North American T-6 Texan
  - North American OV-10 Bronco
  - Bréguet Alizée
  - Yako Team (YAK-18T, YAK-52, YAK-50)
  - Nieuport 10

=== 37th edition (2020) ===
The 37th edition took place on May 13, 2023 on the airfield of Muret-Lherm.

== See also ==
- Paris Air Show
- La Ferté-Alais Air Show
- Farnborough Airshow
- Air show
- List of airshows
- EAA AirVenture Oshkosh
- Berlin Air Show
- Dubai Airshow
- IPS’AIR
