= Rieumes =

- Commune
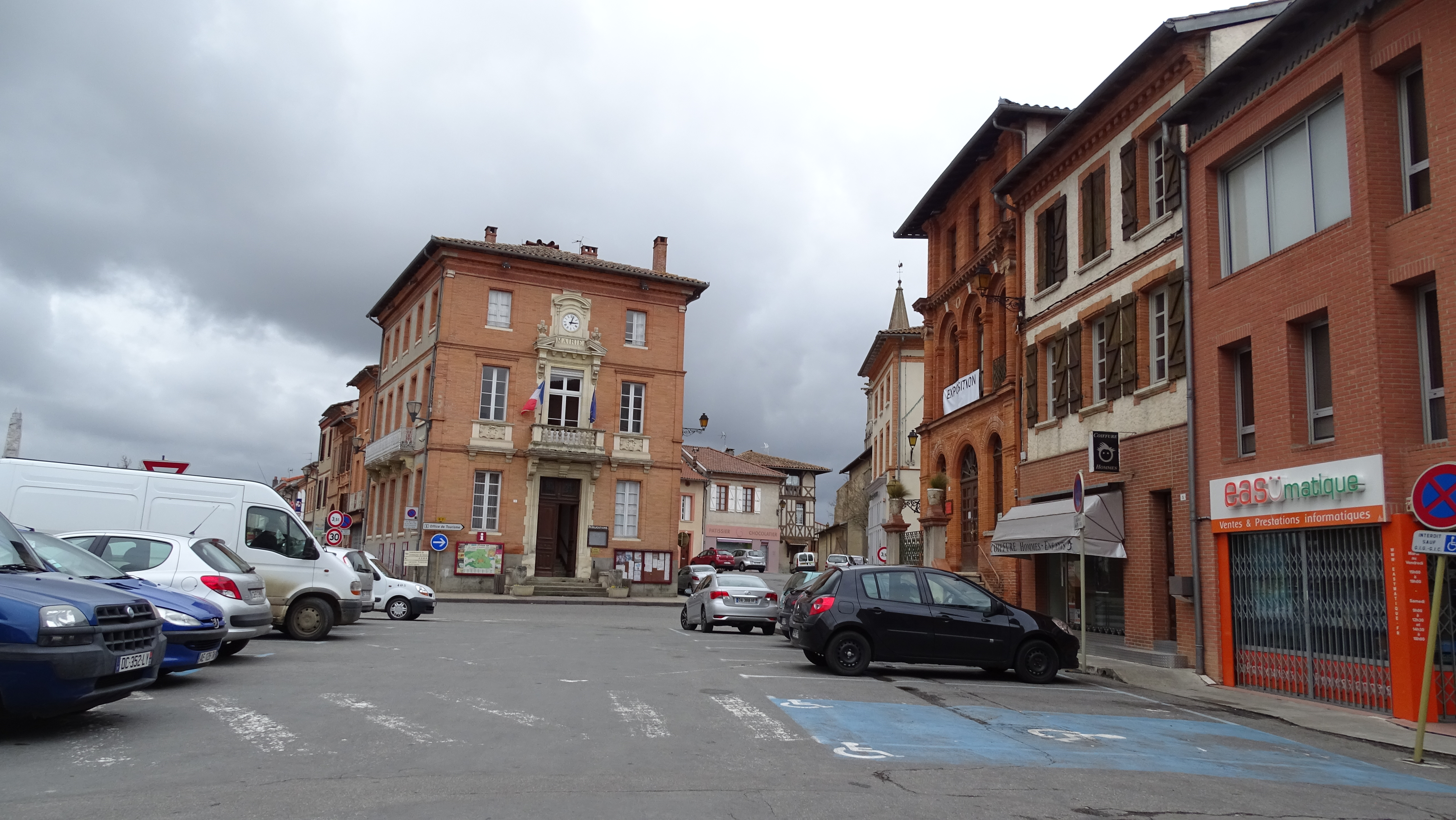
- The town hall in Rieumes

- Coat of arms
- Location of Rieumes
- Location within France Location within Occitanie
- Coordinates: 43°24′48″N 1°07′07″E
- Country: France
- Region: Occitania
- Department: Haute-Garonne
- Arrondissement: Muret
- Canton: Cazères
- Intercommunality: Cœur de Garonne

Government
  - Mayor (2020–2026): Jennifer Courtois-Périssé
- Area^{1}: 30.9 km^{2} (11.9 sq mi)
- Elevation: 280 m (920 ft)
- Highest elevation: 332 m (1,089 ft)
- Lowest elevation: 214 m (702 ft)
- Population (2023): 3,517
  - Density: 114/km^{2} (295/sq mi)
- Time zone: UTC+01:00 (CET)
  - Summer (DST): UTC+02:00 (CEST)
- INSEE/Postal code: 31454 /31370
- ^{1} French Land Register data, which excludes lakes, ponds, glaciers > 1 km^{2} (0.386 sq mi or 247 acres) and river estuaries.

Rieumes (French pronunciation: [ʁjœm]; Occitan: Riumas) is a commune in the Haute-Garonne department in southwestern France.

== Population ==
Historical population

Year	Pop.	±% p.a.
1793	1,008	—
1800	1,125	+1.58%
1806	1,266	+1.99%
1821	1,375	+0.55%
1831	1,610	+1.59%
1836	2,000	+4.43%
1841	1,801	−2.07%
1846	1,972	+1.83%
1851	2,068	+0.96%
1856	2,220	+1.43%
1861	2,302	+0.73%
1866	2,304	+0.02%
1872	2,171	−0.99%
1876	2,231	+0.68%
1881	2,167	−0.58%
1886	2,124	−0.40%
1891	2,114	−0.09%
1896	2,080	−0.32%
1901	2,029	−0.50%

Year	Pop.	±% p.a.
1906	2,035	+0.06%
1911	2,031	−0.04%
1921	1,872	−0.81%
1926	1,823	−0.53%
1931	1,805	−0.20%
1936	1,850	+0.49%
1946	1,727	−0.69%
1954	1,660	−0.49%
1962	1,772	+0.82%
1968	1,987	+1.93%
1975	2,084	+0.68%
1982	2,341	+1.68%
1990	2,414	+0.38%
1999	2,601	+0.83%
2007	3,237	+2.77%
2012	3,432	+1.18%
2017	3,509	+0.44%
2023	3,517	+0.04%

Source: EHESS and INSEE (1968-2023)

== See also ==
- Communes of the Haute-Garonne department
- Maquis de Rieumes
