= Louis-Noël Belaubre =

French pianist and composer

Louis-Noël Belaubre (27 December 1932 – 17 July 2017) was a French classical pianist and composer.

== Biography ==
Born in Muret, Belaubre studied the piano at the Conservatoire de Paris with Lazare-Lévy and music composition with Tony Aubin. From 1975, he directed the conservatory of Grasse after having been a professor at the Saint-Maur Conservatory and director of the Chevilly Conservatory. His work for piano is abundant, but he also composed symphonic music, chamber music, vocal music. He recognizes in his career the importance of the music by Béla Bartók, Frank Martin, Bohuslav Martinů, Benjamin Britten while expressing himself in a clear, expressive, diversified language, whose originality and specificity kept him away from the pre-established musical currents.

== Prizes ==
- 1962: Chamber Music Prize at the Monaco "Concours de Composition Musicale"
- 1965: Ballet Music Prize of Geneva
- 1972: First prize of music composition of the Stroud composition (England)
- 1980: Chevillon-Bonnaud Composition Prize of the Fondation de France for his entire piano work
- Winner of the Viotti International Piano Competition
- Winner of the Munich International Piano Competition

== Works ==
Piano

- 15 Sonatas: No 1, Op. 5; No 2, Op. 9; No 3, Op. 14 (dedicated to Lazare-Lévy), No 4, Op. 18; No 5, Op. 55; No 6, Op. 56; No 7, Op. 74; No 8, op. 80; No 9, Op. 82; No 10, Op. 83 (dedicated to Sylvie Baschéra); No 11, Op. 94 (2002); No 12, Op. 96 (dedicated to Nicolas Bacri); No 13, Op. 103; No 14, Op. 104; n° 15, Op. 108
- 3 Thèmes et variations: "sur un air hongrois"; "sur un chant d’amour du Pays basque"; "sur un thème original" (Op. 3, No 1 to 3)
- Poétique du piano 47 pieces in 6 volumes (Op. 23 to 28): Élégie, Fileuse, Questions et réponses, Bagatelle, Marche, Romance, La mélancolie, Lamento, Berceuse, Entendu dans un cauchemar, Lunaire, Lydienne, Rêverie extatique, Ode funèbre, Fugace, Rondo-musette, Choral profane, Impatiences, Errances, Divagations, Gymel, Ariette, Enharmonies, Romance du gai savoir, Strépitoso, Envolées, Traduit du silence, Chant pour le matin, Furioso, Prélude, Ricercare, Burlesque, Fugue aux tons opposés, Fugue à sujet modulant, Canon à la seconde mineure, Caprice, Ricercare aux tons opposés, Prelude and fugue, Cinq moments musicaux, Toccata.
- 20 Pièces faciles d'après des chants du folklore du midi de la France (Op. 90)
- 8 Pièces brèves (Op. 84)
- 12 Inventions (Op. 87)
- Cadences for concertos by Mozart (10), Haydn (2) and Beethoven (1 to 4)
- Sonate for piano 4 hands (Op. 11)
- Humoresque, for 2 pianos (Op. 65)
- Sonate for 2 pianos (Op. 11 bis)
- Dialogue for 2 pianos (Op. 61 ter)
- Prélude et fugue for 2 pianos (Op. 64)
- 7 Préludes for piano 4 hands (Op. 86 bis)
- 14 Nouvelles Pièces brèves (Op. 107)

Chamber music

- Sonata No. 1 for violin and piano (Op. 2)
- Chants du Pays de Beaune for cello and piano (Op. 13)
- Fantasmagories for clarinet and piano (Op. 34)
- Grand duo-Sérénade for two cellos, or bassoon and cello (Op. 31)
- Romances du Gai Savoir for flute, viola (or clarinet) and harp (Op. 37), version for flute, clarinet and piano (Op. 37 bis)
- Pastorale for celle and piano (Op. 38)
- String Quartet No. 1 (Op. 39)
- 3 Nocturnes for piano and percussions (Op. 42)
- Sonata for cello (Op. 49)
- Les 3 Saisons for flute and piano (Op. 53); version for guitar, flute, and cello (Op. 53 bis)
- 6 Moments musicaux for violin and cello (Op. 54)
- Dialogue for piano and analog synthesizer (Op. 61)
- Variations sur un air anglais (Variations on an English Air) for viola (or clarinet) and piano (Op. 63)
- Rêverie for bassoon and piano (Op. 66)
- Fugue for three clarinets and bass clarinet (Op. 64 bis)
- 10 Pièces concertantes for solo violin (Op. 68)
- Quatre Bagatelles (Four Bagatelles) for violin and viola (Op. 70)
- Jéricho, toccata for two trumpets and large organ (Op. 73)
- Concert en trio for flute, viola and piano (Op. 97)
- Sonata for cello and piano (Op. 101)
- Sonata for tenor (or soprano) recorder and piano (Op. 102)
- Trio for piano, violin and cello (Op. 106)

Music for various instruments

- 20 Pièces concertantes for harpsichord (Op. 19)
- Passacaille for organ
- Livre des Préludes for organ
- Danses vives et mélancoliques for guitar (Op. 47)
- Berceuse for 2 guitars (Op. 48)
- Les Amours de Don Perlimplin, suite for violin and guitar (Op. 78)

Chant A Cappella

- 6 Poèmes de Rolland Pierre, for four-part mixed choir (Op. 44)
- 3 Madrigaux italiens, for 2 sopranos, alto, tenor and bass (Op. 85)

Singing and piano

- 3 Poèmes de Goethe, for tenor or soprano and piano (Op. 7)
- 3 Chansons françaises, for high voices and concertante piano (Op. 8)
- 7 Chants du pays de Beaune, for vocal quartet and piano (Op. 13 bis)
- Le Tombeau de Louisa Paulin, Prelude and five songs for viola voice, clarinet, cello and piano (Op. 41), or viola voice, oboe and strings (Op. 41 bis)
- Matins d'été for medium voices and piano (Op. 71)
- Ode à Jean de La Fontaine for two sopranos, baritone, bass, mixed choir and piano concerto (Op. 72)
- 6 Mélodies françaises pour soprano ou ténor et piano (Op. 22)
- Cantique du Soleil of Saint Francis of Assisi, for choirs of children or women with two equal voices, 2 violins, viola, cello, double bass and piano (Op. 79 bis)
- Cantique du Soleil version for soprano and grand organ (Op. 79 ter)
- 2 Chants Spirituels, for high voices and piano (Op. 81)
- 3 Madrigaux italiens, for 5-part mixed choir
- 4 Poems by Antonio Machado for mezzo and piano (Op. 109)

Symphonic music

- Concerto pour flûte et cordes (Op. 1)
- Adagio et rondo for two pianos and orchestra (Op. 4)
- Concerto No 1 for piano and orchestra (Op. 30)
- Concerto No 2 for piano and ten instruments (Op. 40)
- Concerto No2 version for piano and orchestra (Op. 40 bis)
- Concerto pour violoncelle et orchestre à cordes, after Boccherini's sonata in C major (Op. 46)
- Concerto pour violon et orchestre (Op. 59)
- Dialogue for piano and orchestra (Op. 61 ter)
- Symphonie concertante for two cellos, or bassoon and cello (Op. 32)
- Symphonie concertante No 2 for oboe, piano and string orchestra (Op. 33)
- Symphonie concertante No 3 for guitar, harpsichord and string orchestra (Op. 50)
- Symphonie concertante No 4 for violin, viola and orchestra (Op. 58)
- Symphonie No 1 (Op. 6)
- Symphonie No 2 (Op. 10)
- Suite extraite de l’École des Pickpockets (Op. 17)

Orchestre et chant

- Cantique du Soleil, for children's or women's choirs with two equal voices, organ and string orchestra (Op. 79)

Œuvres scéniques

- L’École des Pickpockets, ballet in 3 tableaux for large orchestra (Op. 17)
- Les rêves de Camille, féérie for narrator, children's choir with 3 equal voices, synthesizer and orchestra (Op. 60)

== Transcriptions ==
- Mozart: Sonata for piano 4 hands K. 521 transcribed for cello and piano
- Boccherini: Sonata in C major for cello and bass transcribed in concerto for cello and string orchestra
- Bach: 7 organ pieces transcribed for piano
- Bach: 12 organ chorals transcribed for two pianos
- Bach: 6 organ chorals transcribed for 2 oboes and piano or organ
- Bach: 6 organ chorals transcribed for oboe and piano or organ
- Haendel: Sonate for 2 violins and basstranscribed for 5 cellos

== Notable recordings ==
- Romances du gai savoir, Le tombeau de Louisa Paulin, Ode pour Jean de La Fontaine, Éditions L'Empreinte digitale; Louis-Noël Belaubre, 1999

== Works ==
- Louis-Noël Belaubre, Pour un cinquième âge de la musique, essay, Paris, L’Harmattan, series "Musiques en question(s)", 2016, 280 p.
- Louis-Noël Belaubre, Petit dictionnaire analytique, critique et polémique de musique; précédé de Trois essais sur l'invention musicale, Sampzon, Delatour, 2004, 228 p.
- Louis-Noël Belaubre, Traité de technique et de pédagogie du piano, Sampzon, Delatour, 2004, 137 p.
