= Plaisance-du-Touch =

- Commune
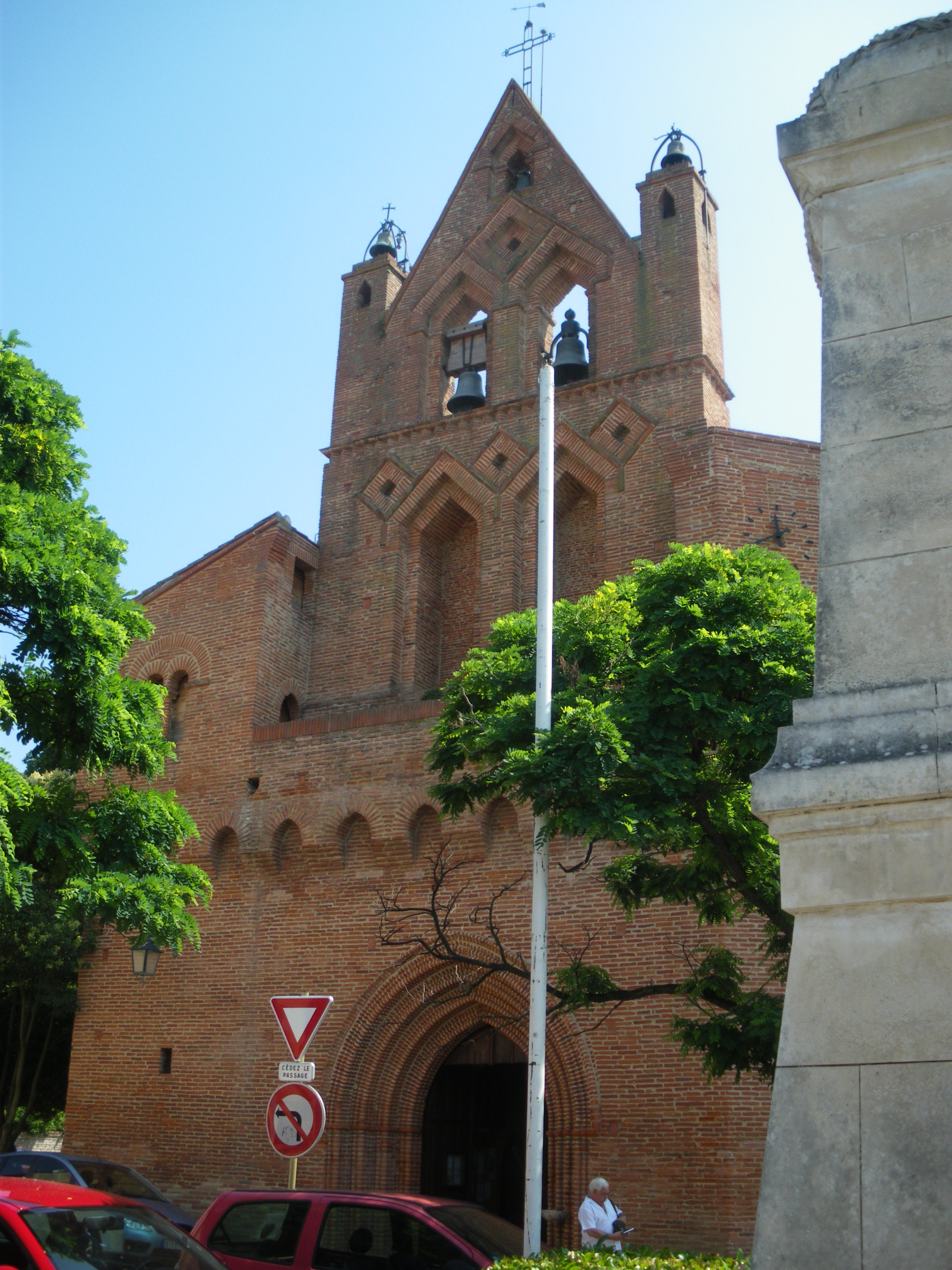
- The church in Plaisance

- Coat of arms
- Location of Plaisance-du-Touch
- Location within France Location within Occitanie
- Coordinates: 43°34′00″N 1°17′50″E
- Country: France
- Region: Occitania
- Department: Haute-Garonne
- Arrondissement: Toulouse
- Canton: Plaisance-du-Touch
- Intercommunality: CC Le Grand Ouest Toulousain

Government
  - Mayor (2020–2026): Philippe Guyot
- Area^{1}: 26.53 km^{2} (10.24 sq mi)
- Elevation: 181 m (594 ft)
- Highest elevation: 200 m (660 ft)
- Lowest elevation: 157 m (515 ft)
- Population (2023): 21,079
  - Density: 794.5/km^{2} (2,058/sq mi)
- Time zone: UTC+01:00 (CET)
  - Summer (DST): UTC+02:00 (CEST)
- INSEE/Postal code: 31424 /31830
- ^{1} French Land Register data, which excludes lakes, ponds, glaciers > 1 km^{2} (0.386 sq mi or 247 acres) and river estuaries.

Plaisance-du-Touch (French pronunciation: [plɛzɑ̃s dy tuʃ], literally Plaisance of the Touch; Occitan: Plasença de Toish, Gascon: Plasença deu Toish) is a commune in the Haute-Garonne department, southwestern France. It has a church featuring a notable organ by the Toulouse-based builder Puget.

== Population ==
The inhabitants of the commune are known as Plaisançois and Plaisançoises.

Historical population
Year	Pop.	±% p.a.
1968	2,622	—
1975	4,560	+8.23%
1982	5,753	+3.38%
1990	10,075	+7.26%
1999	14,164	+3.86%
2007	15,443	+1.09%
2012	16,616	+1.47%
2017	18,715	+2.41%
2023	21,079	+2.00%
Source: INSEE

== Geography ==
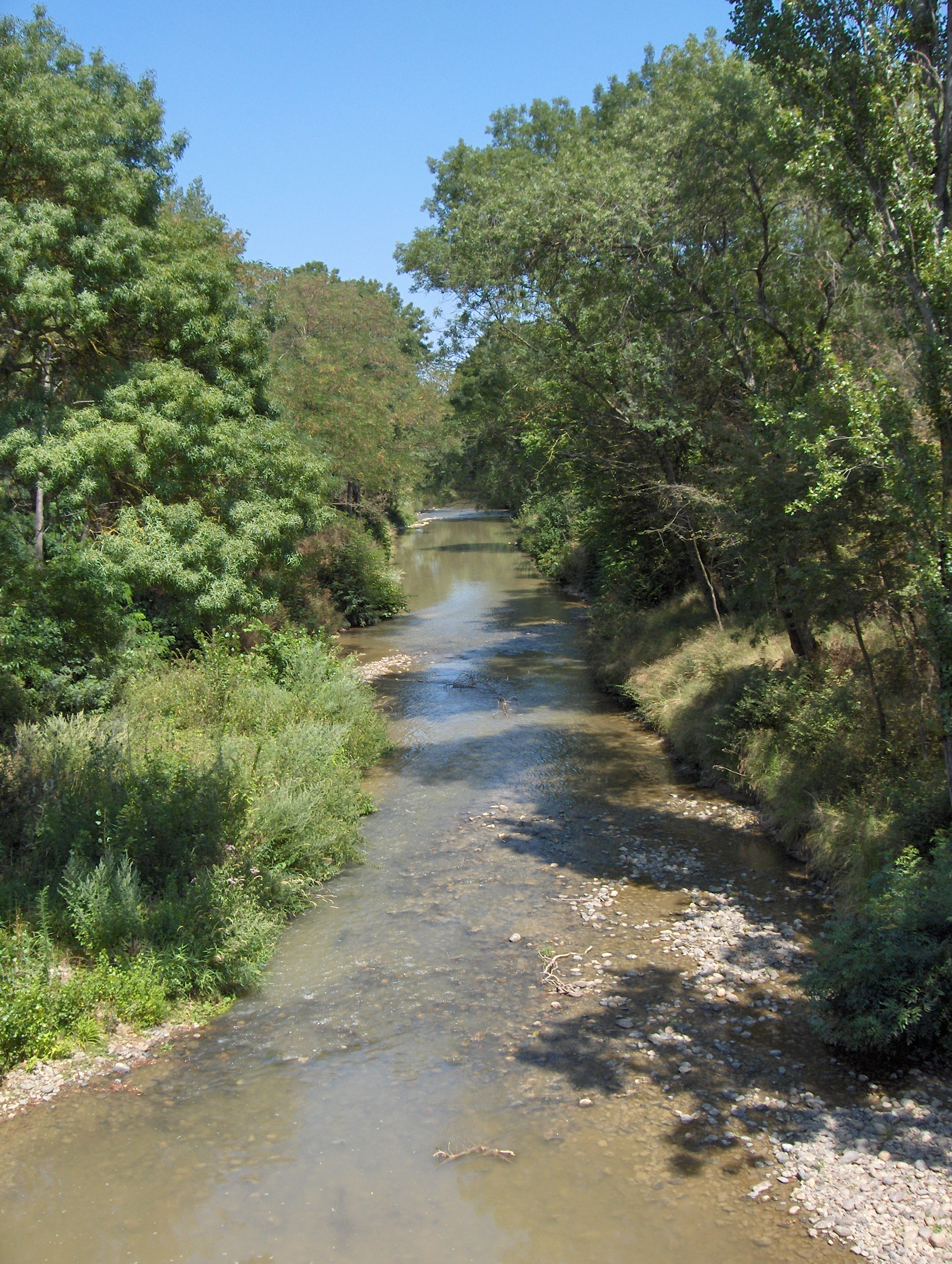
The Touch in Plaisance-du-Touch

The commune is traversed by the river Touch.

== International relations ==
Plaisance-du-Touch is twinned with:

- Lingfield, United Kingdom
- Carnate, Italy
- Utebo, Spain

== See also ==
- Communes of the Haute-Garonne department
