= Château de Rudelle =

Castle in Haute-Garonne, France

Coordinates: 43°27′7″N 1°18′38″E

The Château de Rudelle is a 16th and 17th century castle in the commune of Muret in the Haute-Garonne département of France.

The castle is noted for its ancient chimneys and for murals painted on the third floor.

It was built by Guillaume de Rudelle, the son of Jean de Rudelle, a counsellor to the king. In 1783, Jean-Marie-Joseph Ingres, the father of the artist Jean-Auguste-Dominique Ingres, stayed there and painted several ceilings. At the French Revolution, the property was taken as a national asset and sold at auction.

The building today has a rectangular plan within square towers at each corner. On the south, a square tower projects slightly. On the top floor, immediately below the roof, is a series of arcades on the north and south façades. Mullioned windows decorate the façade. The upper floors are reached by a wooden spiral staircase.

Privately owned, it has been listed since 1979 as a monument historique by the French Ministry of Culture.

== See also ==
- List of castles in France
