= Hôtel de Ville, Muret =

Town hall in Muret, France

Hôtel de Ville
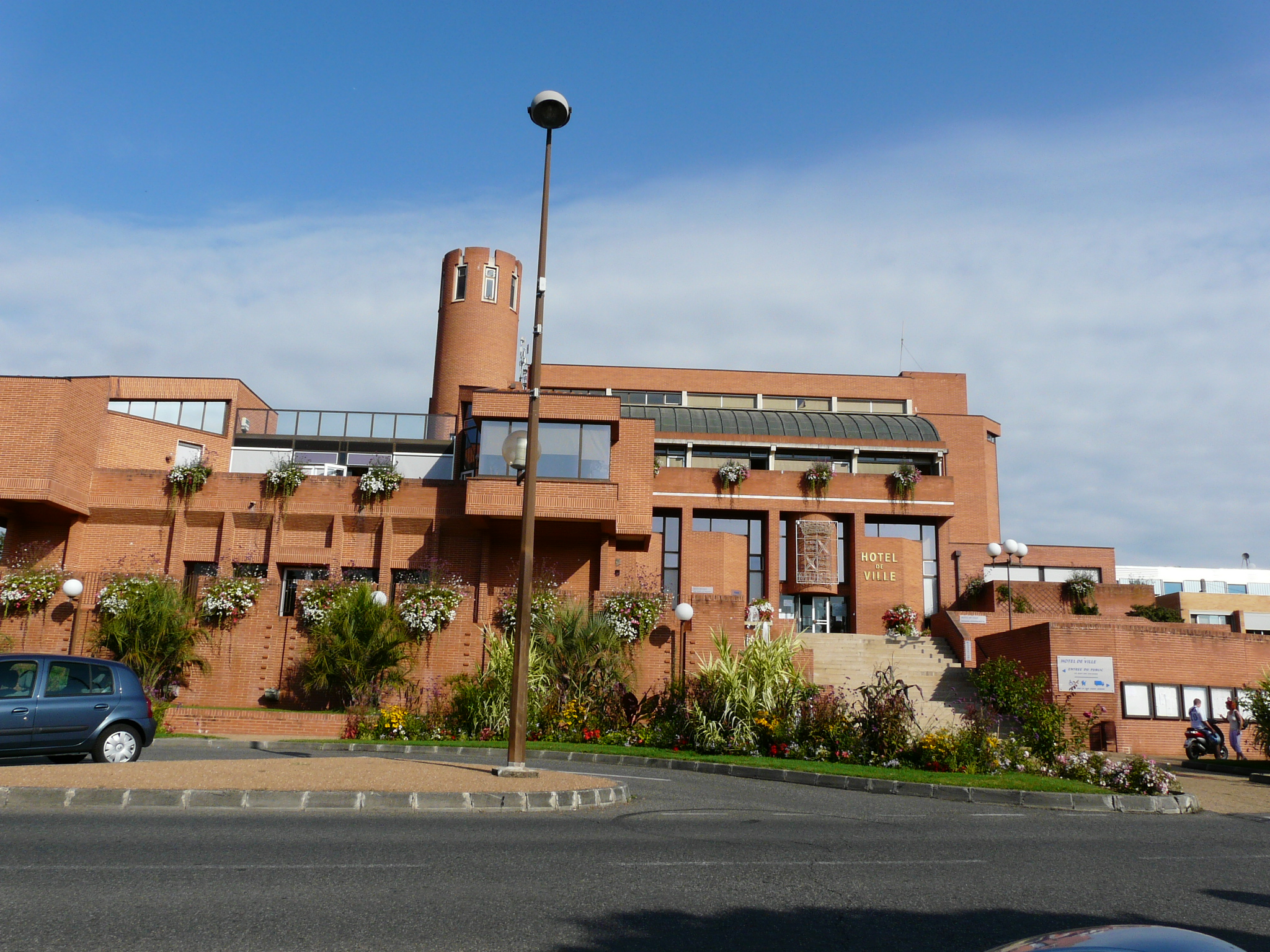
- The main frontage of the Hôtel de Ville in August 2008
- Interactive map of the Hôtel de Ville area

General information
- Type: City hall
- Architectural style: Modern style
- Location: Muret, France
- Coordinates: 43.4615°N 1.3307°E
- Completed: 1990

The Hôtel de Ville (French pronunciation: [otɛl də vil], City Hall) is a municipal building in Muret, Haute-Garonne, in southwest France, standing on Rue de Castelvielh.

== History ==
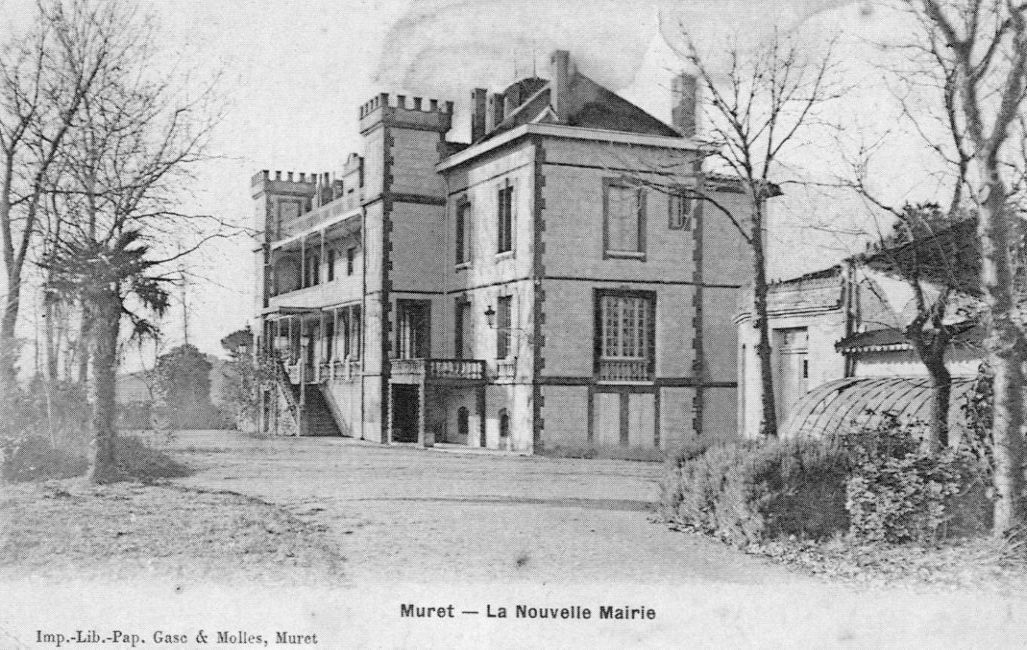
The Château Saint-Germier

Following the French Revolution, the town council initially met in the house of the mayor at the time. This arrangement continued until the early 20th century, when the council led by the mayor, Joseph Gasc, decided to establish a dedicated town hall. The building they selected was the Château Saint-Germier on what is now Square des Combattants d'Afrique. The château was designed in the neoclassical style, built in brick with a cement render finish and was completed in the 19th century.

The design involved a symmetrical main frontage of 13 bays facing southeast towards the garden (now Parc Clément Ader). The central section of seven bays featured a forestair leading up to a balustraded veranda on the first floor; there was also a veranda on the second floor. The bays on either side of the central section were projected forward and formed by castellated towers which were blind in the first stage and fenestrated by casement windows in the upper stages. The end sections of two bays each were also fenestrated by casement windows.

The council acquired the building and surrounding land in around 1902. It then commissioned school buildings on sites flanking the château. The school buildings were designed in the neoclassical style, built in red brick and were completed in 1905. The designs for the schools were identical and involved main frontages of five bays each facing onto the street. In both cases, the central bay featured a segmental-headed doorway on the ground floor, a French door with a balcony on the first floor, and a pediment containing a plaque depicting the gender of the pupils at roof level. The other bays were fenestrated by segmental headed windows on both floors. The left-hand building accommodated the boys' school, and the right-hand building accommodated the girls' school.

A statue intended to commemorate the life of the inventor, Clément Ader, was created by the sculptor, Paul Landowski, and installed in front of the town hall in 1930. After the château was no longer required for municipal use, it was demolished and the school buildings flanking the château were converted for use as the Maison des Associations (Community Centre). A marble plaque inscribed with the words "Hôtel de ville, musée historique, écoles, police" was recovered from the château and installed in the entrance of the local museum.

In the mid-1980s, following significant population growth, the council led by the mayor, Jacques Douzans, decided to commission a modern town hall. The site they selected was on the north side of Rue de Castelvielh facing towards the River Garonne. The new building was designed in the modern style, built in red brick and was completed in around 1990. The design had similarities to a fortress: the left land section was projected forward, while the right-hand section featured a steep flight of steps leading up to an entrance on the first floor providing access to a glass atrium. Above the atrium, there was a veranda with a curved roof, and, to the left, there was a box that was projected forward and, behind it, there was a circular castellated tower. Internally, the principal room was the Salle du Conseil (council chamber).
