= Guillaume Ibos =

French opera singer (1860–1952)

Guillaume Ibos (10 July 1860 – 22 September 1952) was a French opera singer.

== Career ==
Born in Muret (Haute-Garonne), Ibos continued his musical studies at the Conservatoire de Paris, where he won first prize. He was immediately hired at the Paris Opera.

He made his debut at the Opéra Garnier as a young tenor in 1882, playing the role of Fernando in Donizetti's La Favorite, which he played again in 1885.

He became one of the main French tenors of the Belle Époque. He was toured extensively to sing his repertoire, notably in Madrid, Brussels, Geneva, Vienna, and St. Petersburg. He toured the United States in 1897–1898. His debut at La Scala took place in 1904. (Note: He played the Duke in Rigoletto)

Since Ibos was a friend of Jules Massenet, the latter modified the score of the character of Werther, previously planned for a baritone, and remade it to suit the tenor role. The premiere was held at the Vienna State Opera (Note: With Ernest Van Dyck in the title role and Marie Renard as Charlotte) (in a German translation) on 16 February 1892 and the première in French at the Théâtre de Genève on 27 December 1892. The work was presented at the Opéra-Comique on 16 January 1893 with Ibos in the title role. Ibos also played major roles such as the Duke in Rigoletto, Don Ottavio in Don Giovanni, Roméo in Roméo et Juliette, Vasco in Meyerbeer's L'Africaine, Raoul in Les Huguenots, and Don Gomez in Camille Saint-Saëns' Henry VIII. He also sang Wagner and was nicknamed "the King of Lohengrin". (Note: In particular, he played this role at the Teatro Real of Madrid in 1895 and the Treatro San Joao of Lisbon in 1899)

Ibos died in Montesquieu-Volvestre (Haute-Garonne).

The Clément-Ader museum of Muret keeps the written archives (correspondence, photographs, sheet music, various documents), certain stage costumes, recordings, posters and props of this great tenor of the Belle Époque.
