= Muret station =

Railway station in Muret, France

Muret
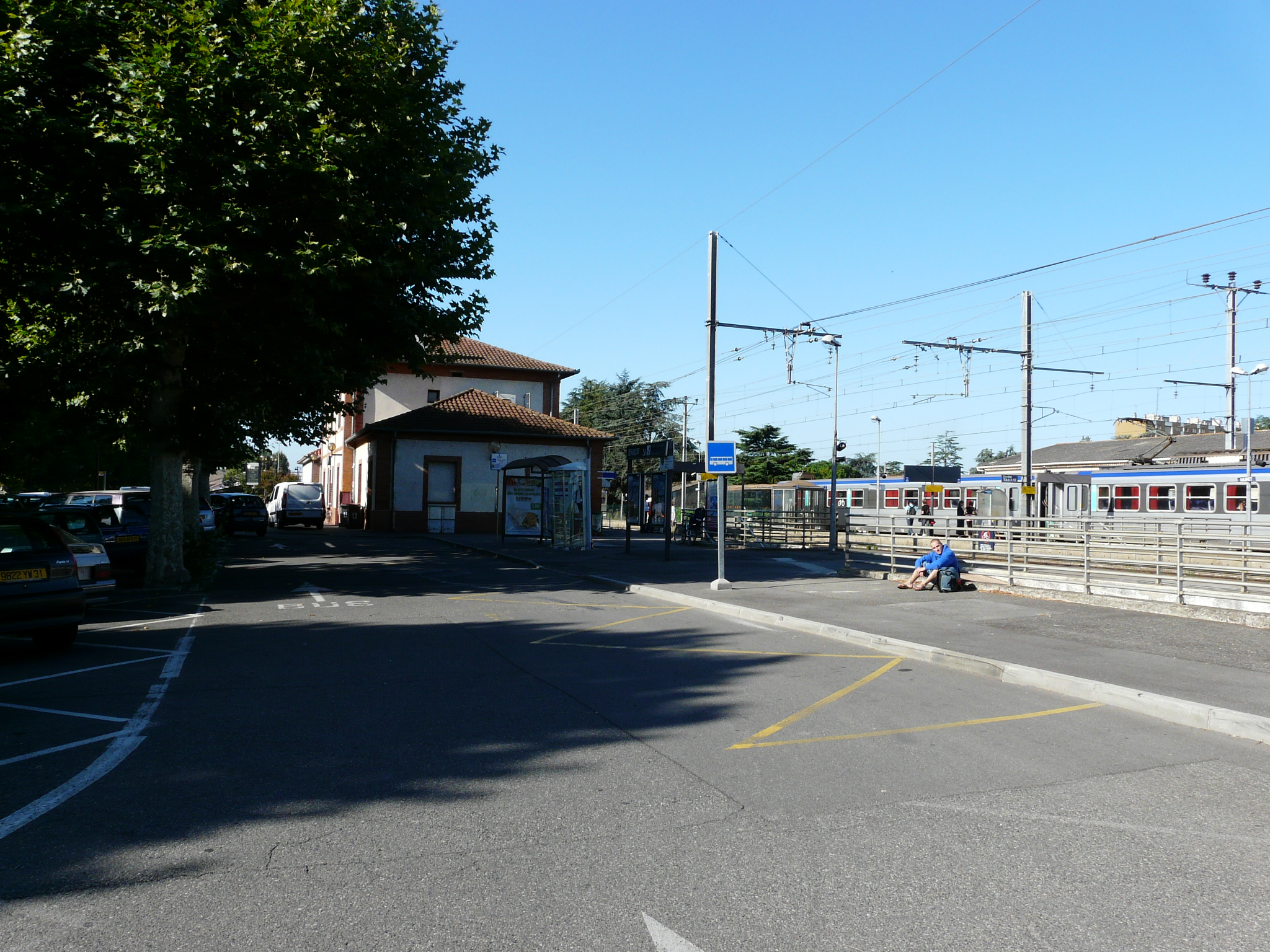
- Muret railway station

General information
- Location: Muret, Haute-Garonne, Occitanie, France
- Coordinates: 43°27′53″N 1°19′26″E
- Line: Toulouse–Bayonne railway
- Platforms: 3
- Tracks: 4

Other information
- Station code: 87611038

History
- Opened: 9 June 1862

Services
Preceding station	TER Occitanie	Following station
Le Fauga towards Pau	15	Portet-Saint-Simon towards Toulouse
Location

Muret is a railway station in Muret, Occitanie, France. The station is on the Toulouse–Bayonne railway. The station is served by TER (local) services operated by the SNCF.

== Train services ==
The following services currently call at Muret:

- local service (TER Occitanie) Toulouse–Saint-Gaudens–Tarbes–Pau
