= Muret =

Muret Murèth (Occitan)
- Subprefecture and commune
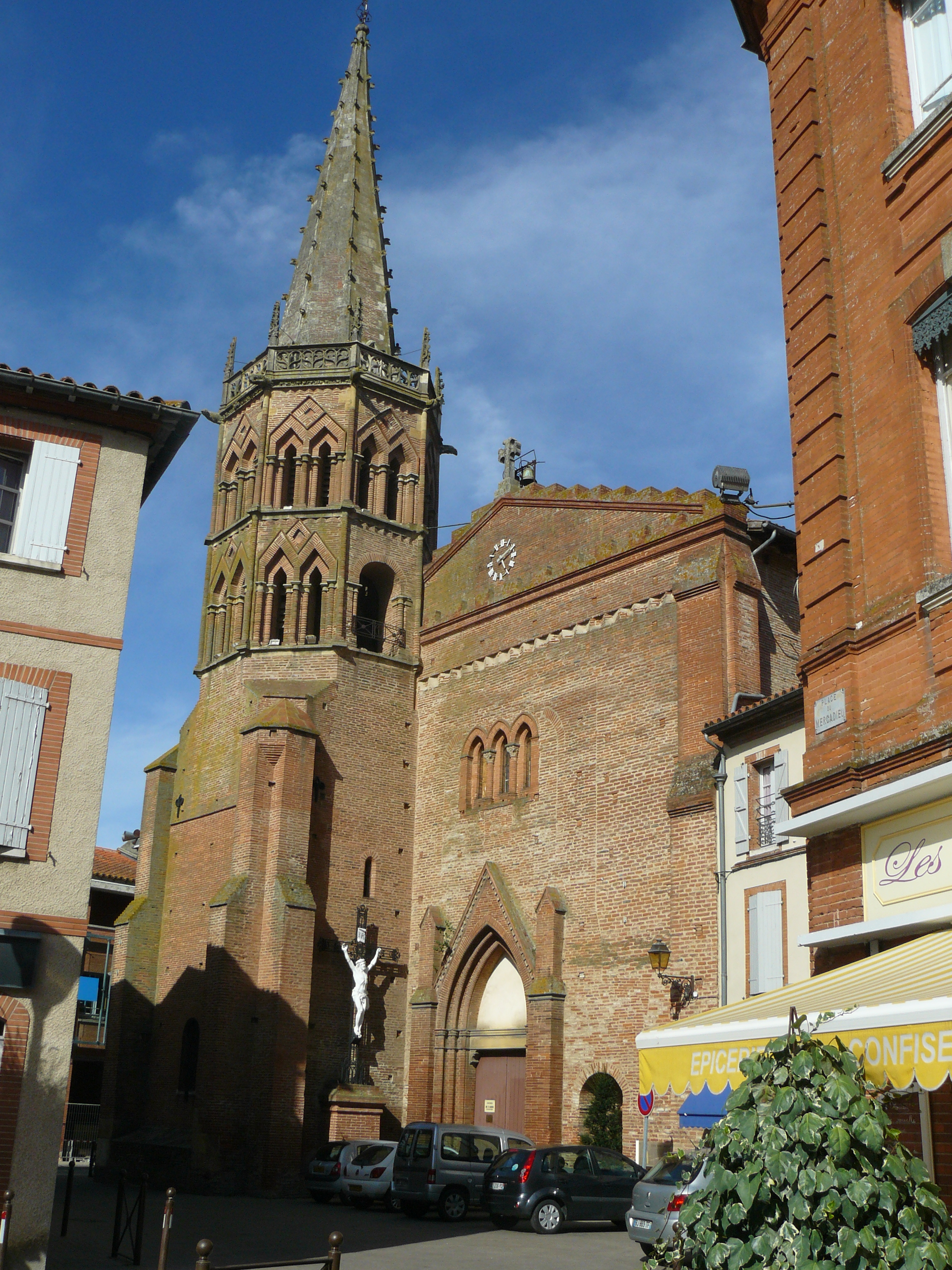
- The centre of Muret with Saint Jacques Church and its octagonal medieval tower

- Coat of arms
- Location of Muret
- Location within France Location within Occitanie
- Coordinates: 43°27′40″N 1°19′36″E
- Country: France
- Region: Occitania
- Department: Haute-Garonne
- Arrondissement: Muret
- Canton: Muret
- Intercommunality: Le Muretain Agglo

Government
  - Mayor (2020–2026): André Mandement
- Area^{1}: 57.84 km^{2} (22.33 sq mi)
- Elevation: 169 m (554 ft)
- Highest elevation: 305 m (1,001 ft)
- Lowest elevation: 152 m (499 ft)
- Population (2023): 26,079
  - Density: 450.9/km^{2} (1,168/sq mi)
- Time zone: UTC+01:00 (CET)
  - Summer (DST): UTC+02:00 (CEST)
- INSEE/Postal code: 31395 /31600
- ^{1} French Land Register data, which excludes lakes, ponds, glaciers > 1 km^{2} (0.386 sq mi or 247 acres) and river estuaries.

Muret (French pronunciation: [myʁɛ]; in Gascon Occitan Murèth) is a commune in the Haute-Garonne department, of which it is a subprefecture, in the Occitanie region of southwestern France. Its inhabitants are called Muretains.

It lies just outside of the city of Toulouse, even though it is not in the region of Toulouse Métropole, which it has declined to join. It lies southwest of Toulouse and is the largest component of the intercommunality of Le Muretain Agglo.

Muret is generally known for the Battle of Muret (1213) and as the birthplace of the Renaissance humanist Muretus (1526–1585) and of Clément Ader (1841–1925), inventor and aviation pioneer. It is also the birthplace of the Niel family from which Adolphe Niel, Marshal of France and Minister of War, was derived.

== Geography ==
A floral town (two flowers) located in the urban area of Toulouse and the Toulouse urban unit, 22 kilometres (14 mi) south of Toulouse. It is equidistant from the Mediterranean and the Atlantic, on the Garonne Toulouse plain.

=== Localities and hamlets ===
Ox, Estantens, Cupidou.

=== Geology and relief ===
The commune is established on the first terrace of the Garonne on its left bank. Its right bank is overhung by a steep slope which deeply cut the molasse of the Tertiary era. It has an area of 5,784 hectares (14,290 acres) and an altitude ranging from 152 to 305 metres (499 to 1,001 ft).

=== Transport ===
- By road: By the Route Nationale 117 and the A64 autoroute (old Route Nationale 125), exits 35 , 34 , 33 .
- By rail: By the SNCF, Gare de Muret TER Occitanie on the Toulouse - Bayonne line (Line D of the Toulouse transit network).
- By bus: By the Arc-en-ciel de Haute-Garonne network, Toulouse transit network Tisséo and the TAMtam network.
  - Several Tisséo bus routes connect the commune to the Toulouse Metro, including:
  - 58 bus route from Basso Cambo to the lycée Pierre-d'Aragon passing through the centre of the commune.
  - 117 bus route from Potier-Oncopole to Muret railway station.
- By air: Muret is 26 kilometres (16 mi) from Toulouse–Blagnac Airport, as well as 5 kilometres (3.1 mi) from the Muret – Lherm Aerodrome (tourist flights) and the Toulouse Francazal Airport (business jets).

=== Hydrography ===
Muret is located on the Garonne river at its confluence with the Louge, which flows northeast through the commune. The Garonne flows north through the commune and forms part of its northern border. The Ousseau tributary of the Touch is also in the commune, and the Canal de Saint-Martory.

=== Climate ===
Muret has an oceanic temperate climate, with Mediterranean and continental influences, characterised by a hot, dry summer, mild winter and a spring marked by heavy rains and severe thunderstorms. The prevailing winds are, in order of importance, the west wind (usually bringing moisture from the Atlantic Ocean), the southeast wind (also called the Vent d'autan, a rather hot, dry wind) and the north, which is much less frequent and generally a cold and dry wind (bringing air from cold anticyclonic masses in Northern Europe).

Comparative table of climatic data
Location	Sunshine	Rain	Snow	Storm	Fog
Nice	2694 hrs/yr	767 millimetres (30.2 in)/yr	1 day/yr	31 days/yr	1 day/yr
Toulouse	2047 hrs/yr	655 millimetres (25.8 in)/yr	7 days/yr	26 days/yr	44 days/yr
Paris	1797 hrs/yr	642 millimetres (25.3 in)/yr	15 days/yr	19 days/yr	13 days/yr
Strasbourg	1637 hrs/yr	610 millimetres (24 in)/yr	30 days/yr	29 days/yr	65 days/yr
National Average	1973 hrs/yr	770 millimetres (30 in)/yr	14 days/yr	22 days/yr	40 days/yr

Muret has averaged 24 days of extreme heat and 33 days of frost per year. The rainiest months are April, May and June. The normal minimum temperatures occur in January with average 5 °C (41 °F), and the maximum normal temperatures in August with 23 °C (73 °F).

Climate data for Muret (Muret – Lherm Aerodrome, 1991−2020 normals, extremes 1996−present)
Month	Jan	Feb	Mar	Apr	May	Jun	Jul	Aug	Sep	Oct	Nov	Dec	Year
Record high °C (°F)	20.0 (68.0)	23.9 (75.0)	27.8 (82.0)	29.1 (84.4)	33.9 (93.0)	39.6 (103.3)	39.4 (102.9)	40.9 (105.6)	35.4 (95.7)	30.9 (87.6)	24.9 (76.8)	21.9 (71.4)	40.9 (105.6)
Mean daily maximum °C (°F)	9.8 (49.6)	11.3 (52.3)	15.0 (59.0)	17.7 (63.9)	21.2 (70.2)	25.7 (78.3)	28.0 (82.4)	28.5 (83.3)	25.3 (77.5)	20.2 (68.4)	13.6 (56.5)	10.4 (50.7)	18.9 (66.0)
Daily mean °C (°F)	5.9 (42.6)	6.7 (44.1)	9.7 (49.5)	12.4 (54.3)	15.9 (60.6)	19.9 (67.8)	21.8 (71.2)	22.0 (71.6)	18.9 (66.0)	14.9 (58.8)	9.3 (48.7)	6.4 (43.5)	13.6 (56.5)
Mean daily minimum °C (°F)	2.0 (35.6)	2.1 (35.8)	4.4 (39.9)	7.1 (44.8)	10.6 (51.1)	14.2 (57.6)	15.7 (60.3)	15.6 (60.1)	12.5 (54.5)	9.6 (49.3)	4.9 (40.8)	2.3 (36.1)	8.4 (47.1)
Record low °C (°F)	−9.9 (14.2)	−14.7 (5.5)	−8.7 (16.3)	−3.6 (25.5)	−0.2 (31.6)	3.8 (38.8)	7.6 (45.7)	5.5 (41.9)	3.2 (37.8)	−4.2 (24.4)	−9.1 (15.6)	−11.4 (11.5)	−14.7 (5.5)
Average precipitation mm (inches)	58.0 (2.28)	42.4 (1.67)	47.3 (1.86)	63.4 (2.50)	73.8 (2.91)	51.5 (2.03)	40.8 (1.61)	43.3 (1.70)	40.5 (1.59)	47.5 (1.87)	60.4 (2.38)	51.5 (2.03)	620.4 (24.43)
Average precipitation days (≥ 1.0 mm)	9.0	8.0	8.3	9.3	9.8	6.7	5.9	6.3	5.9	7.2	10.3	8.6	95.3
Source: Météo-France

== History ==
=== Prehistory and antiquity ===
Various discoveries by local archaeologists suggest that the territory of Muret was populated as early as the Neolithic period: A hut foundation dating from 4000 BC has been unearthed to the north of the town. Different objects in the Chalcolithic, around 3,000 to 2,500 BC; then the Bronze Age from 1,700 BC indicate the permanence of the population here. A series of Gallo-Roman brick kilns dating back to the 1st century AD is located along the right bank of the Garonne. A villa occupied the site of the current town centre; surrounded by protective walls it was given the name of Murellum, which became Murel, and then Muret in the Middle Ages.

=== Middle Ages ===
On 12 September 1213 the Battle of Muret took place between Simon de Montfort and a coalition force under the control of Count Raymond of Toulouse, and King Peter II of Aragon. Muret entered history. That day, the battle changed the horizons of both sides of the Pyrenean border and saw the fate of Occitania decided. In an era where feudal entities (including the Count of Toulouse and his allies) still believed that they were able to play a role in the control of the southern areas on both slopes of the Pyrenees, the lords of the north of France, who spearheaded the Albigensian Crusade, attempted to impose themselves upon the south and eliminate Catharism.

De Montfort had been fighting Albigensian heretics during the Albigensian Crusade, when he was besieged by the vastly superior coalition army. Refusing to surrender or be starved into submission, de Montfort went on the offensive. Leading his knights out of the town, he proceeded to position them in a wide arc, then fell upon the Toulouse cavalry with a noise like a whole forest going down under the axe. Next to fall before the Crusader army was the Aragonian cavalry, where King Peter himself fell to the sword. After this, all that was left was to scatter the remaining cavalry defending the coalition camp before turning on the infantry that had been besieging Muret's walls. Despite their overwhelming advantage in numbers, the coalition army numbering almost 34,000 men was destroyed by de Montfort's army of only 2,100. The siege of Muret was lifted.

7,000-20,000 coalition troops were killed compared to a handful of casualties for de Monfort's army.

So it was at Muret, on 12 September 1213, where King Peter II of Aragon who came to reinforce the local Occitan forces, lost his life. This defeat of the Occitano-Aragonese troops heralded the annexation of the Languedoc to the Crown of France and the end of Catharism.

=== World War II ===
A unit of the French Resistance known as the Maquis de Rieumes, formed by André Reboul in 1942, were very active in the area during the Second World War.

=== Post war ===
The Hôtel de Ville was completed in around 1990.

=== Heraldry ===
Arms of Muret	The arms of Muret are blazoned : "Quartered: On the first and fourth of argent to two crenellated fesses azure, the second and third gules to the four otelles of argent backed and posed in saltire", which is of Comminges.

== Politics and administration ==
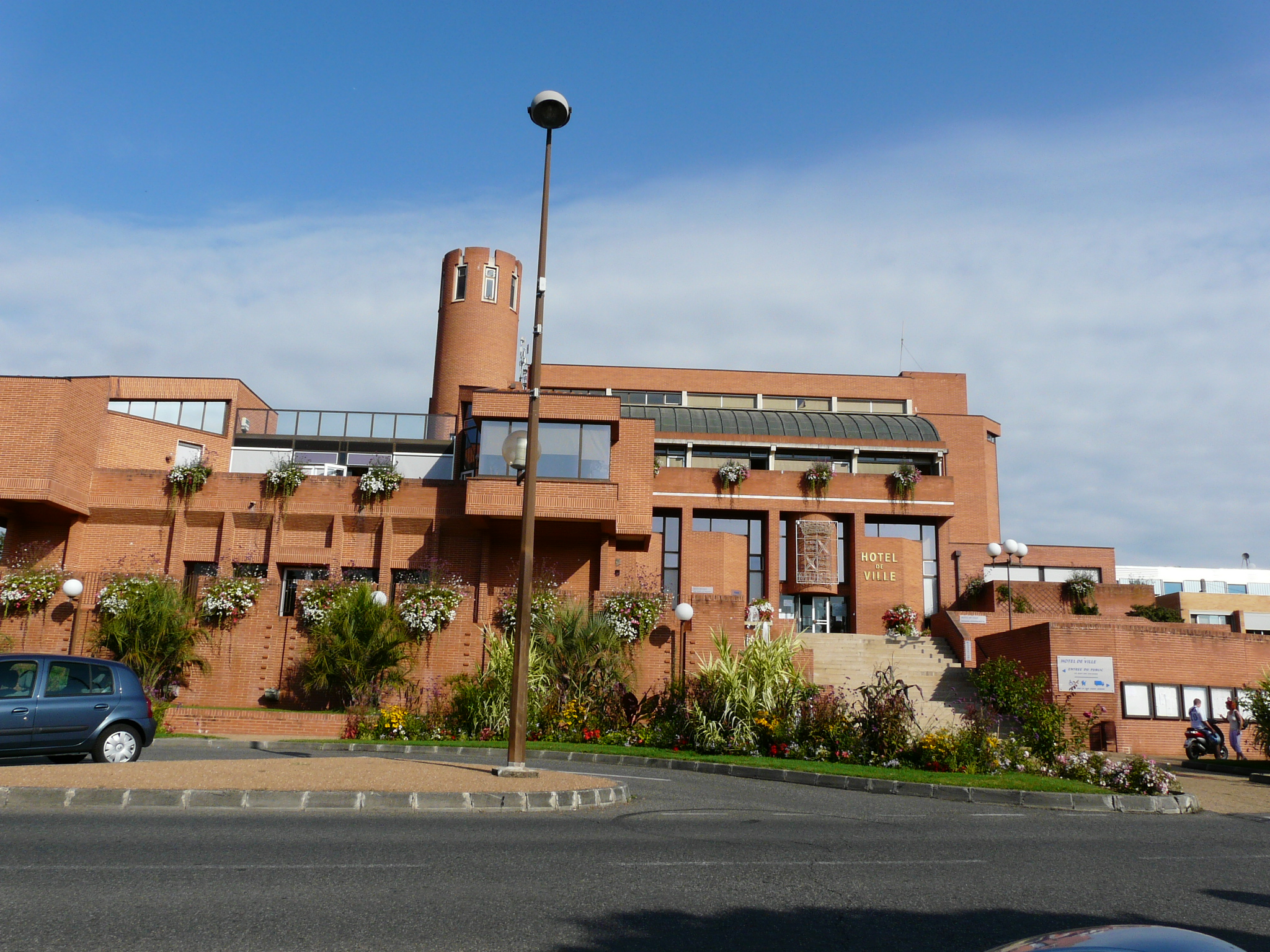
The Hôtel de Ville

=== Political trends and outcomes ===
The commune is part of the Sixth district of the Haute-Garonne.

=== List of mayors ===
List of mayors of Muret
Start	End	Name	Party	Other details
1925	1947	Vincent Auriol	SFIO	Deputy, President of France from 1947 to 1954
1947	1953	Henri Peyrusse	SFIO	
1953	1989	Jacques Douzans	DVD	Deputy
1989	1995	Hélène Mignon	PS	Deputy
1995	2008	Alain Barrès	UMP	Former deputy, president of the CAM
2008	In progress	André Mandement	PS	President of the CAM

=== Judicial and administrative proceedings ===
The capable courts for the commune of Muret are the Court of Muret, the High Court of Toulouse, the Court of Appeal, the Cour d'appel de Toulouse, Toulouse juvenile court, the Industrial Tribunal of Toulouse, the Commercial Court of Toulouse, the Administrative Court of Toulouse and the Administrative Court of Appeal of Bordeaux.

=== International relations ===
Muret is twinned with:

- Monzón, Spain
- Hertford, Hertfordshire, United Kingdom

== Demography ==
Historical population

Year	Pop.	±% p.a.
1793	3,000	—
1800	3,258	+1.19%
1806	3,284	+0.13%
1821	3,286	+0.00%
1831	3,787	+1.43%
1836	3,972	+0.96%
1841	4,000	+0.14%
1846	4,308	+1.49%
1851	4,196	−0.53%
1856	4,125	−0.34%
1861	4,130	+0.02%
1866	4,050	−0.39%
1872	3,852	−0.83%

Year	Pop.	±% p.a.
1876	3,956	+0.67%
1881	4,056	+0.50%
1886	4,145	+0.44%
1891	4,142	−0.01%
1896	4,064	−0.38%
1901	3,911	−0.76%
1906	3,712	−1.04%
1911	3,654	−0.31%
1921	3,218	−1.26%
1926	3,482	+1.59%
1931	3,725	+1.36%
1936	4,013	+1.50%
1946	4,368	+0.85%

Year	Pop.	±% p.a.
1954	5,204	+2.21%
1962	6,693	+3.20%
1968	13,039	+11.76%
1975	14,778	+1.80%
1982	15,844	+1.00%
1990	18,134	+1.70%
1999	20,735	+1.50%
2007	23,572	+1.62%
2012	24,492	+0.77%
2017	24,945	+0.37%
2023	26,079	+0.74%

From 1962 to 1999: Population without double counting; for the years following: municipal population.
Source: Ldh/EHESS/Cassini until 1999 then INSEE

== Economy ==
Muret is a true centrality in the area of life and activity of the Muretain, near Toulouse. Its stable economic fabric is composed primarily of small and medium-sized enterprises and industries, covering many sectors of activities. The economic development jurisdiction is exercised by the Agglomération Community of Muretain, which develops and consolidates the local economic fabric, and helps the creation of enterprises for the benefit of employment.

Muret has important reserves mainly located on the areas of activities of the territory.

Muret Gateway: 20 hectares (49 acres) located north of the town, at the junction of the A64 exit.

- Cap Clément Ader / Les Bonnets: Adjacent to the Muret-Lherm airport, with in its centre, the international karting.
- Joffrery: 97 hectares (240 acres) at the northern entrance of Muret.
- Marclan: 35 hectares (86 acres) north of the town.
- Sans Soucis: 16 hectares (40 acres) at the northern boundary of the town.

=== Industry ===
- Étienne Lacroix Group
- Laboratoires Pierre Fabre
- Éditions Hubert

=== Services ===
- 3rd Regiment of equipment: French Regiment of equipment
- Muret detention centre, specialised in long sentences. Bertrand Cantat, was held in this centre from 28 September 2004 to 15 October 2007 for the killing of his girlfriend, the actress Marie Trintignant.

=== Infrastructure ===
- Muret – Lherm Aerodrome
- Gare de Muret
- TDF transmitter

== Personalities linked to the commune ==
- Peter II of Aragon, (1177?-1213), King of the Crown of Aragon-Catalonia, died at the Battle of Muret. A high school in the town bears his name.
- Niel Family

- Adolphe Niel (1802–1869), Marshal of France (1859) and Minister of War underNapoleon III
- Léopold Niel (1846–1918), son of the Marshal, general of brigade (1897), was buried at Muret as his parents and his cousins, the Niels of Brioudes.
- Charles Niel

- Nicolas Dalayrac (1753–1809), composer of comic operas.
- Clément Ader (1841–1925), inventor
- Vincent Auriol (1884–1966), Mayor of Muret (1925), first President of the Fourth Republic, and his wife, Michelle (1896–1979)
- Guillaume Ibos (1860–1952), tenor
- Charles de Rémusat (1797–1875), politician and philosopher, deputy of Muret.
- Marc-Antoine Muret, humanist, (1526–1585).
- Saint Germerius, Bishop of Toulouse (circa 691 AD).
- Christian Jeanpierre (1965–), sports presenter on TF1, presenter of Téléfoot.
- Louis-Noël Belaubre, pianist and composer (1932).
- Jean Laviguerie (1746–1802), Member of the Estates General.
- Gustave Azerm, deputy, died at Muret
- Manon André, Rugby Union player
- Mirès Vincent, actress, died at Muret
- Raymond Leygues, politician died at Muret
- Jacques Douzans, politician died at Muret
- Éric Fraj, singer, primarily in Occitan
- Guillaume Bonnecarrère, born in Muret
- Albert van Schendel and Antoon van Schendel, road bicycle riders, died at Muret

== Monuments and tourist sights ==
=== Historic monuments ===
- The Church of Santiago de Muret, main monument of the town: It was built in the 12th century through the Counts of Comminges who made wall their principal residence. It is redesigned and enlarged in the 14th and 15th centuries. Particularly noteworthy is its octagonal steeple of Toulouse type. It is classified as early as 1928. In 1538 - 1548, a large vaulted choir was added at the end of the panelled Gothic nave. Its decor is restored after the depredations of the Revolution, under the first Empire, in a neo-classical style and side chapels were built.
- House of 1823, 30 Rue Clément-Ader
- Clément Ader Park
- The Château de Cadeilhac
- The Château de Rudelle is a 16th and 17th century castle. Privately owned, it is inscribed on the list of historic monuments, listed as an historic site by the French Ministry of Culture.

The list of historic monuments of Haute-Garonne, organised by commune.

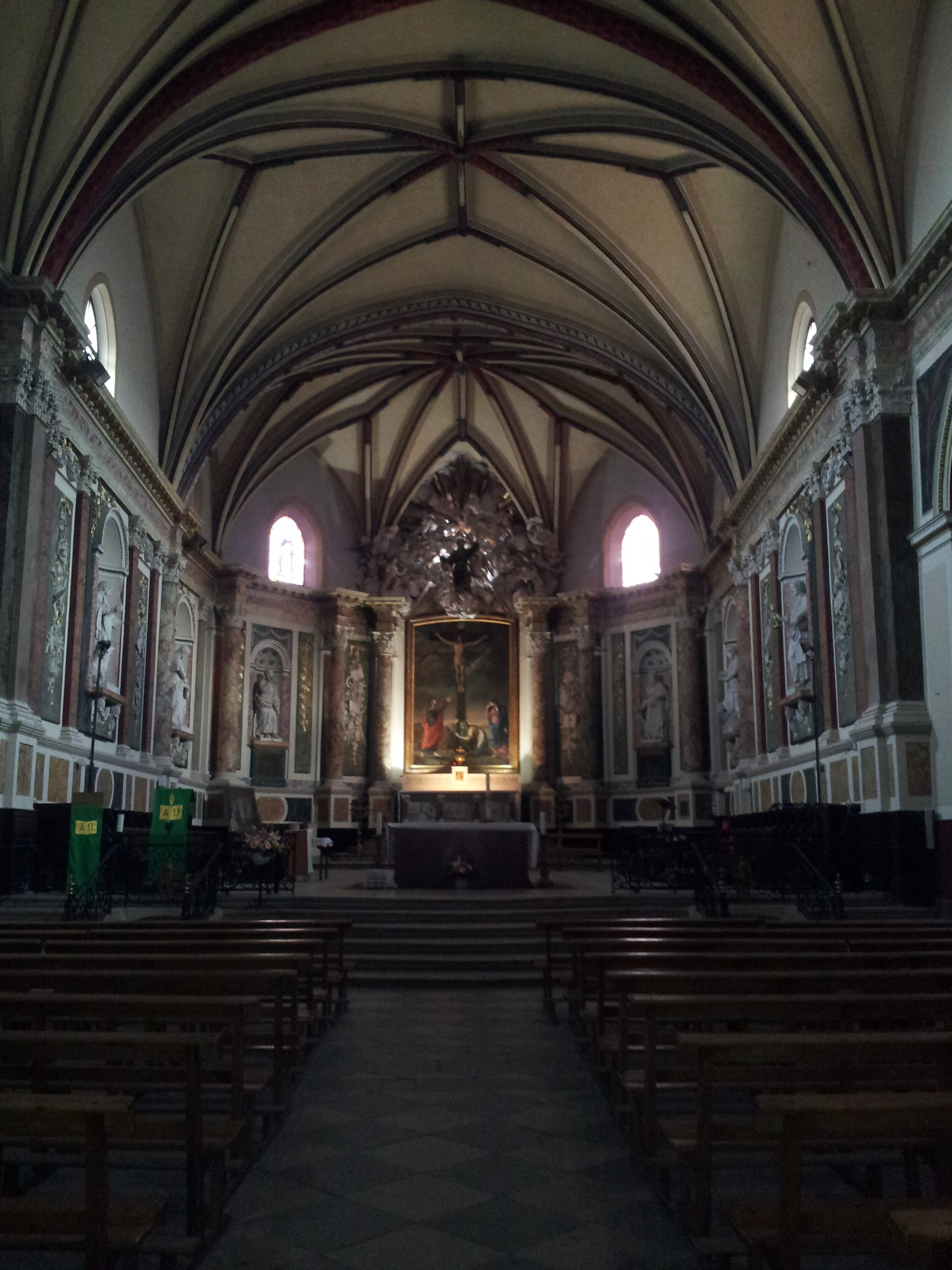
The Church of Saint-Jacques: Nave and choir

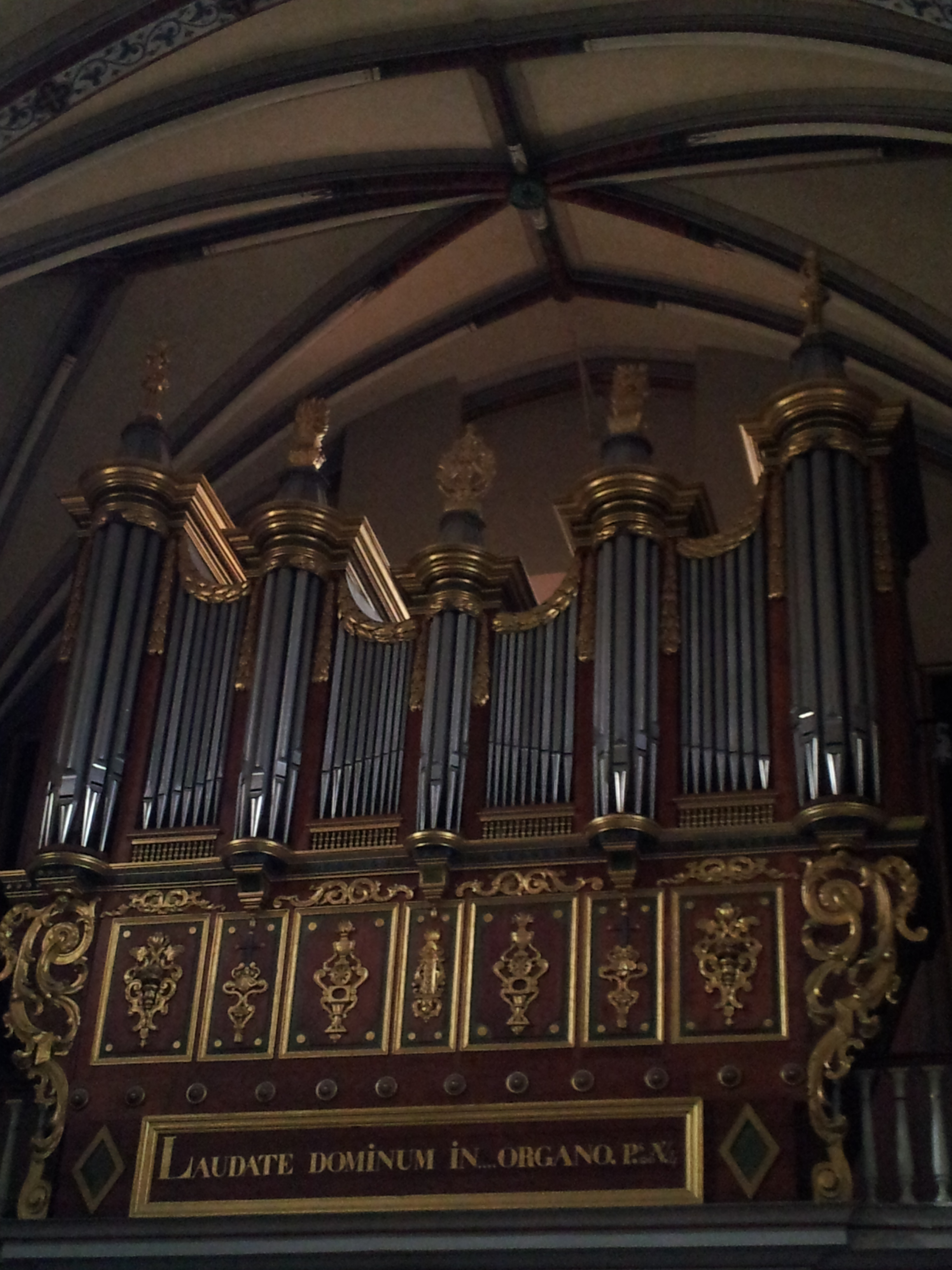
The Church of Saint-Jacques: Organ

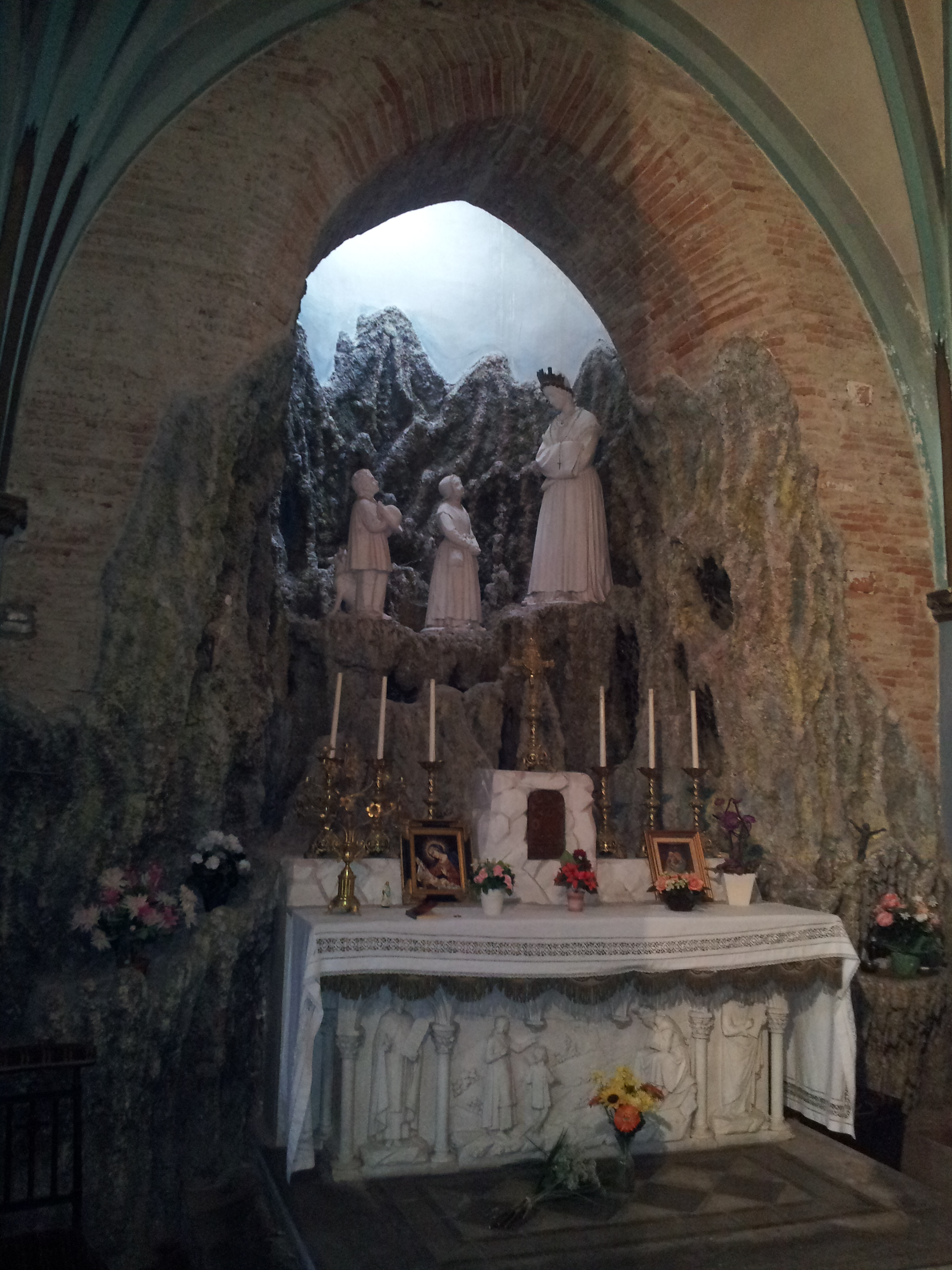
The Church of Saint-Jacques: Chapel of Notre-Dame-de-Lourdes

=== Other monuments and sites ===
- Domain of Brioudes
- Statue of Marshal Niel
- Chapel of Saint-Amans of Estantens
- Château de Montégut-Ségla where Jeanne de Montégut-Ségla lived
- Jean Jaurès Park
- Clement Ader Park
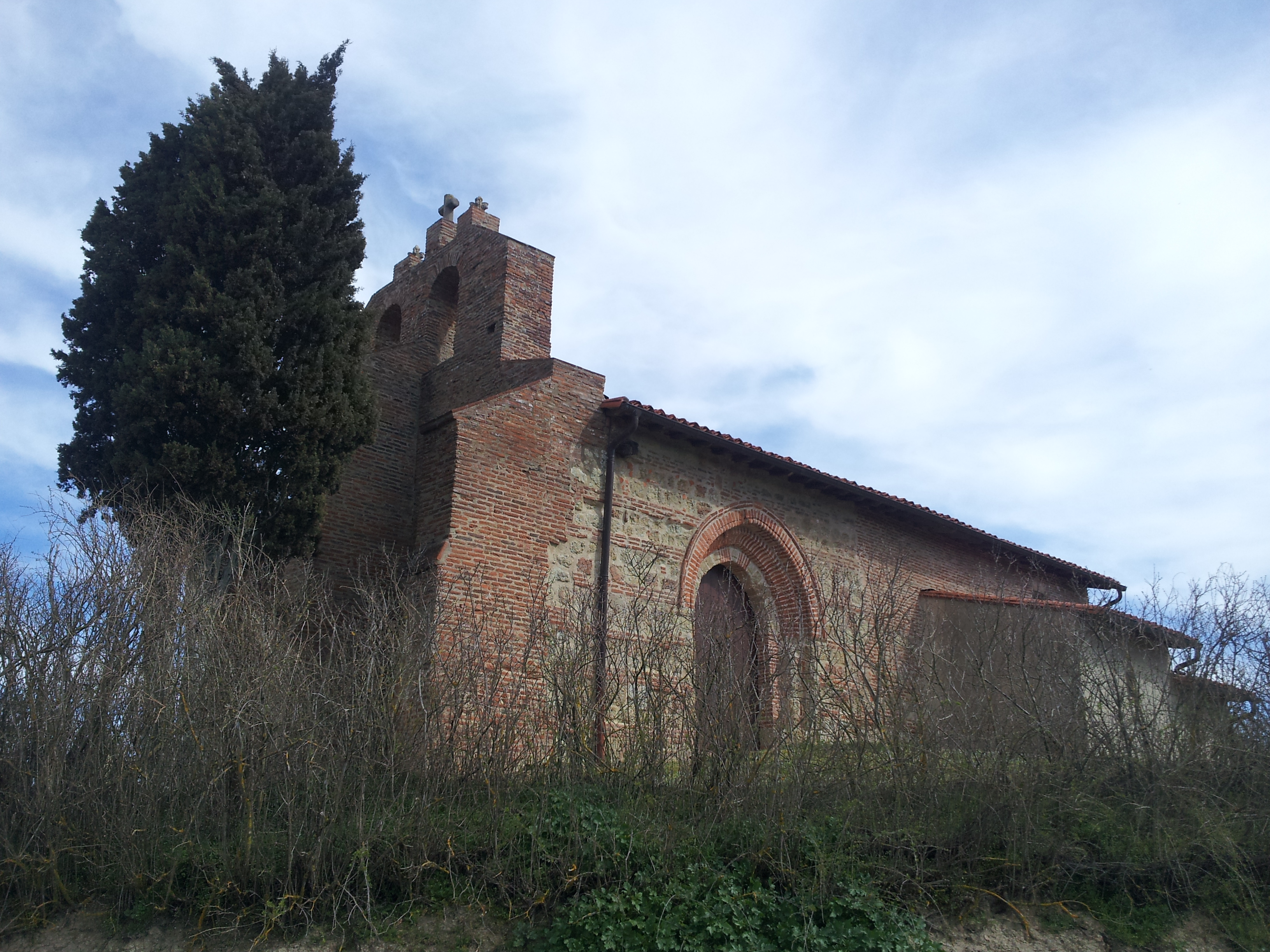
The south side of the Chapel of Saint-Amans of Estantens

== Local life ==
=== Public service ===
Muret has a subprefecture, departmental fire and rescue service, a gendarmerie, a post office, tax office, a retirement home, a DDE centre assigned to the A64 autoroute and a tourist office.

=== Health ===
The commune has a hospital, and a communal social action centre.

=== Education ===
Education is provided at the commune of Muret's creche, passing through nursery school, elementary school and collège until the lycée high school and technical school all being complemented by the municipal library and outdoor centre. The city is also home to a branch of the National School of civil aviation.

=== Culture ===
Muret has multiple cultural facilities, including:

- François Mitterrand Media Library
- Clément-Ader Museum
- Cinema
- The Nicolas-Daylarac municipal school of art teaching
- Contemporary art gallery Duniya The World Of

Muret is home for the well-known Francophone literary award Prix du jeune écrivain de langue française, founded in 1984.

=== Sports ===
Muret offers more than 100 sport and leisure events per year. Its facilities are many and varied: Gymnasiums, tennis courts, recreation area with a fitness trail, two landscaped lakes, international karting, an aerodrome, a canoeing facility, three bowling facilities, a skate park, two shooting ranges, a velodrome, a riding club and the Aqualudia, the Muretain swimming centre with its six indoor and outdoor pools.

Muret has more than 50 sporting associations, including:

- Avenir Muretain XV, Rugby union club which plays in Fédérale 3.
- AS Muret, football club which played in the Championnat National (3rd division) and the AS Muret women's team.
- Texman, bridge club with 120 members.
- The 2014 Fencing Championships of France took place at Muret.
- The Scorpions de Muret American football team.

Muret will also host the departure for Stage 13 of cycling's] 2015 Tour de France on 17 July, with a 198.5 kilometres (123.3 mi) route to Rodez.

=== Worship ===
==== Catholic ====
The town is part of the pastoral sector of Muret, which includes the parishes of Saint-Jacques, Saint-Jean, and the parishes of the villages: Estantens, Ox, Le Fauga, Eaunes and Saint-Hilaire. Father Joseph Coltro is the senior priest of this pastoral area.

==== Protestant ====
The cultural association of the Evangelical Church in Muret occupies premises located at 12 Chemin de la Pyramide, inaugurated in November 2012 after a year of work. The pastor is Bernard Gisquet.

==== Muslim ====
The Association of Franco-Muslim culture and worship of Muret (AFMCCM) acquired the premises of a former locksmith, Rue Marclan, in an industrial area north of Muret, in 2000, for the founding of the mosque of Muret.

=== Ecology and recycling ===
Collection and treatment of household waste and assimilated waste as well as protection and the development of the environment are part of the agglomeration community of the Muretain.

There is a recycling centre in the commune.

== See also ==
- Communes of the Haute-Garonne department
- District of Muret
- Parc naturel régional des Landes de Gascogne
- Généralité d'Auch
- TER Midi-Pyrénées
- Battle of Muret
- Maquis de Rieumes
- List of massacres perpetrated by German forces in France during World War II
