= Lilhac =

- Commune
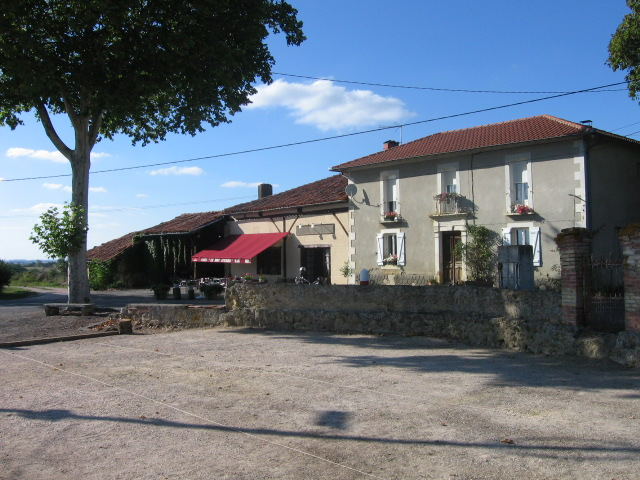
- Pétanque courts at the Bon Accord bar

- Coat of arms
- Location of Lilhac
- Location within France Location within Occitanie
- Coordinates: 43°17′09″N 0°48′36″E
- Country: France
- Region: Occitania
- Department: Haute-Garonne
- Arrondissement: Saint-Gaudens
- Canton: Cazères

Government
  - Mayor (2020–2026): Gilbert Sioutac
- Area^{1}: 7.3 km^{2} (2.8 sq mi)
- Elevation: 390 m (1,280 ft)
- Highest elevation: 381 m (1,250 ft)
- Lowest elevation: 280 m (920 ft)
- Population (2023): 140
  - Density: 19/km^{2} (50/sq mi)
- Time zone: UTC+01:00 (CET)
  - Summer (DST): UTC+02:00 (CEST)
- INSEE/Postal code: 31301 /31230
- ^{1} French Land Register data, which excludes lakes, ponds, glaciers > 1 km^{2} (0.386 sq mi or 247 acres) and river estuaries.

Lilhac (French pronunciation: [lijak]) is a commune in the Haute Garonne department in southwestern France.

== Population ==
Historical population
Year	Pop.	±% p.a.
1968	143	—
1975	120	−2.47%
1982	133	+1.48%
1990	111	−2.23%
1999	90	−2.30%
2007	133	+5.00%
2012	128	−0.76%
2017	130	+0.31%
2023	140	+1.24%
Source: INSEE

Local inhabitants are called Lilhacais in French.

== Geography ==
Lilhac lies roughly 65 km southwest from Toulouse. Its altitude at the highest point is 380 metres, and covers an area of 730ha or 7.3 km².

The river Touch has its source in the commune.

== History ==
Lilhac was registered as a commune in 1668. The local church, Eglise St-Quitterie, dedicated to Saint Quiteria, dates to before the 18th century.

== See also ==
- Communes of the Haute-Garonne department
