= Maquis de Rieumes =

The Maquis de Rieumes was one of the maquis groups of French Resistance fighters during the Second World War.

In 1942, the Juge d'instruction of Muret, André Reboul, along with other patriots, founded the group which in 1944 would become the Maquis de Rieumes.

In 1943, the group reinforced itself and was joined by, among others, Jules Delattre, a retired air force captain who would become the commander of the Maquis de Rieumes. It was also joined by some other Rieumois: Doctor Robert Roger (Médecin Capitaine de réserve), Doctor Charles Chwartz (Médecin Lieutenant de réserve), Jean Lécussan (a retired army Adjudant chef).

The year 1943 was devoted to recruitment, training and to the organization of teams in the villages of the cantons of Auterive, Carbonne, Muret and Rieumes.

In 1944, events gained momentum following parachute drops announced by radio Londres, and an arms depot was set up in Rieumes. On 1 June, battle stations were announced with the message "Messieurs, faites vos jeux". On the 5th, two more messages, "Le père la Cerise est verni" and "Veronese était un peintre" communicated the Normandy landings. In the night, the teams met up in the wooded part of Rieumes and divided themselves into three companies, one of which was based in the forest of Lautignac-Savères. Towards the end of June, the fuse was lit as Reboul joined the corps franc Pommiès with 200 men.

== Notable events involving the maquis ==
- 7 June 1944 : Sabotage of the railway at Capens
- 8 June 1944 : Sabotage of phone lines in the cantons of Rieumes and Carbonne.
- 10 June 1944 : Sabotage of railway points and high-voltage pylons at Noé.
- 11 June 1944 : Sabotage of points and pylons at Muret.
- 12 June 1944 : Destruction of underground gas pipelines at Carbonne.
- 14 June 1944 : Sabotage of pylons at Le Fauga.
- 15 June 1944 : Sabotage of points at Longages.
- 16 June 1944 : Coup de main on a fuel depot at the Francazal aerodrome.
- 29 June 1944 : Sabotage of points and pylons, and destruction of a water pumping station for steam trains at Muret.
- 2 July 1944 : Destruction of SNCF railway signals, tracks and telephone lines at Muret.
- 14 July 1944 : Parade in the cities of Rieumes and Muret.
- 15 July 1944 : A German ambush results in the death of Lieutenant Roger, in charge of the demolitions section.
- On 17 July, at 6:00 in the morning, four JU 88 bombers attacked and dropped their bombs over the part of the forest towards Sajas. However, the maquis was located at the other end of the forest. Part of the forest caught fire.

Towards noon, a white flag was put by Berthe on the "Rougeat" field – the signal that the Germans were arriving. The column included two tractions in front, six jeeps, a machine-gun, an ambulance and approximately 200 men. The fighting lasted three hours and resulted in about 20 casualties among the German troops. Near 3:00 pm, in danger of becoming surrounded, the maquis retired towards Montastruc Savès without sustaining any wounded.

- 20 July 1944 : Installation of the Maquis in the Fabas forest

The Maquis carried out operations until the liberation of Muret on 20 August 1944.

A stele of gratitude to the people of Savères and Lautignac was constructed at the edge of the forest.
