= IPS'AIR =

French airshow created in 2020

IPS’AIR
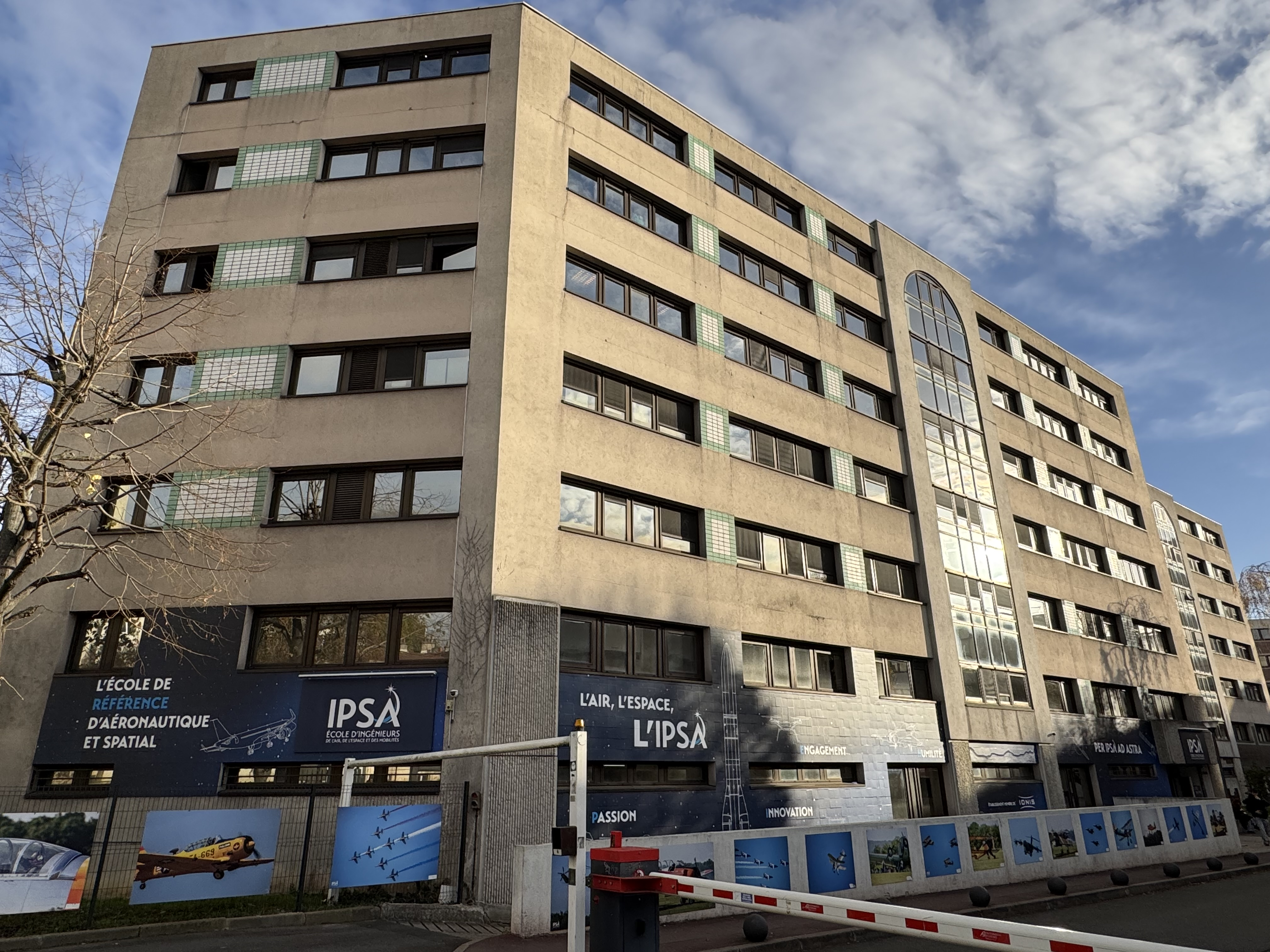
- Genre: Free air show
- Dates: February
- Frequency: Every year
- Venue: Ivry-sur-Seine
- Location: Ivry-sur-Seine
- Coordinates: 48.81455612182617°N 2.3968050479888916°E
- Country: France
- Established: 2020
- Major events: flight simulators conferences exhibitions
- Organizer: Institut polytechnique des sciences avancées
- Website: ipsa.fr

IPS'AIR is a French airshow started in 2020. It is located in Ivry-sur-Seine, close to Paris. It is organized by the grande école Institut polytechnique des sciences avancées, one of the most important aerospace College in France. It is held yearly in February. The 4th edition took place from the 9 to the 21st of February 2023.

== Presentation ==
The flight simulators are representative of the world of aviation, from the Dassault Mirage 2000 to the Republic P-47 Thunderbolt, through the Airbus A320, the Boeing 777 and the Bell 206. Some engines, such as those of the Dassault Rafale or the Jaguar are also exposed thanks to a partnership with Safran.

Conferences related to the aeronautical current events take place. For example, in 2023 Yann Arthus-Bertrand was invited to talk about his book "Mars Terre, destins croisés".

An art exhibition completes the festival. In 2023, visitors could admire the works dedicated to the legends of the sky created by the graffiti artist C215.

== History ==
The first show took place in 2020. Philippe Willekens, head of communication of the European Space Agency came to talk about the future of space exploration.

== See also ==
- Airexpo
- Paris Air Show
- List of airshows
