= Lherm, Haute-Garonne =

Lherm
- Commune
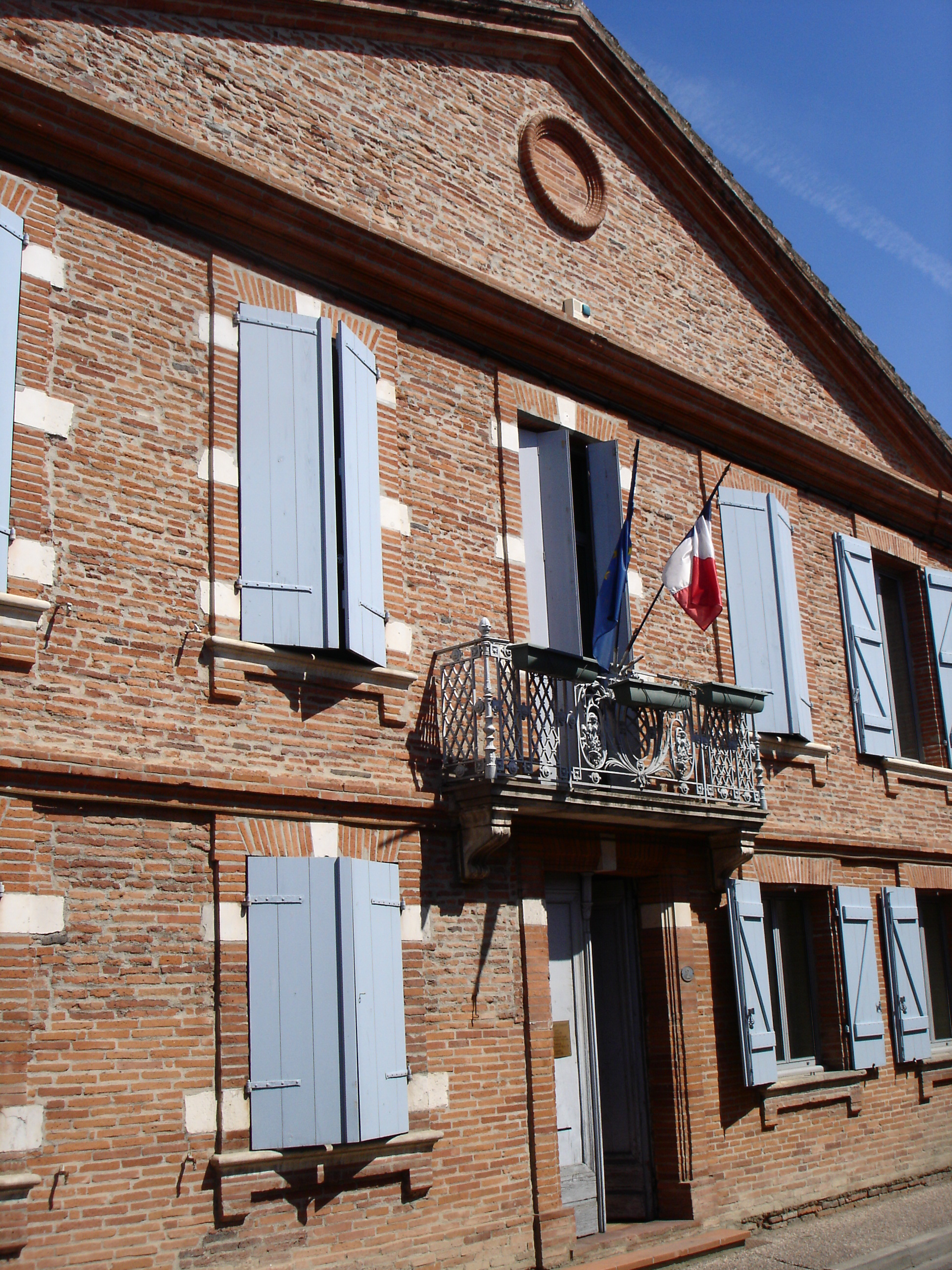
- Town hall

- Coat of arms
- Location of Lherm
- Location within France Location within Occitanie
- Coordinates: 43°25′52″N 1°13′22″E
- Country: France
- Region: Occitania
- Department: Haute-Garonne
- Arrondissement: Muret
- Canton: Cazères

Government
  - Mayor (2020–2026): Frédéric Pasian
- Area^{1}: 27.26 km^{2} (10.53 sq mi)
- Elevation: 225 m (738 ft)
- Highest elevation: 240 m (790 ft)
- Lowest elevation: 187 m (614 ft)
- Population (2023): 3,880
  - Density: 142/km^{2} (369/sq mi)
- Time zone: UTC+01:00 (CET)
  - Summer (DST): UTC+02:00 (CEST)
- INSEE/Postal code: 31299 /31600
- ^{1} French Land Register data, which excludes lakes, ponds, glaciers > 1 km^{2} (0.386 sq mi or 247 acres) and river estuaries.

Lherm (French pronunciation: [lɛʁm]; Occitan: L'Èrm) is a commune in the Haute-Garonne department in southwestern France.

== Geography ==
The commune is traversed by the river Touch.

== Population ==
Historical population
Year	Pop.	±% p.a.
1968	834	—
1975	1,092	+3.93%
1982	1,858	+7.89%
1990	2,266	+2.51%
1999	2,558	+1.36%
2007	3,197	+2.83%
2012	3,507	+1.87%
2017	3,678	+0.96%
2023	3,880	+0.90%
Source: INSEE

== See also ==
- Communes of the Haute-Garonne department
