= Touch (river) =

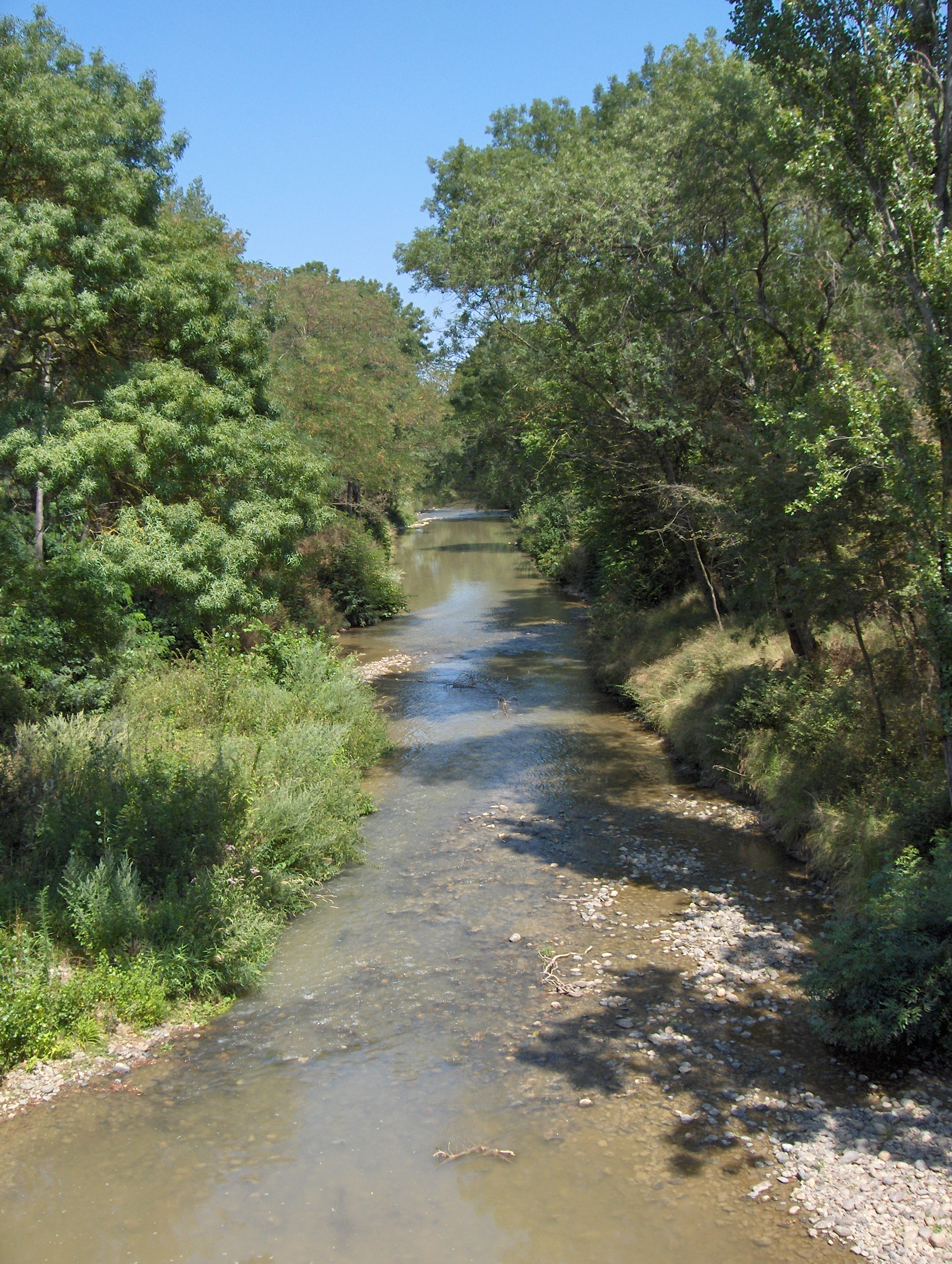
- The Touch at Plaisance-du-Touch

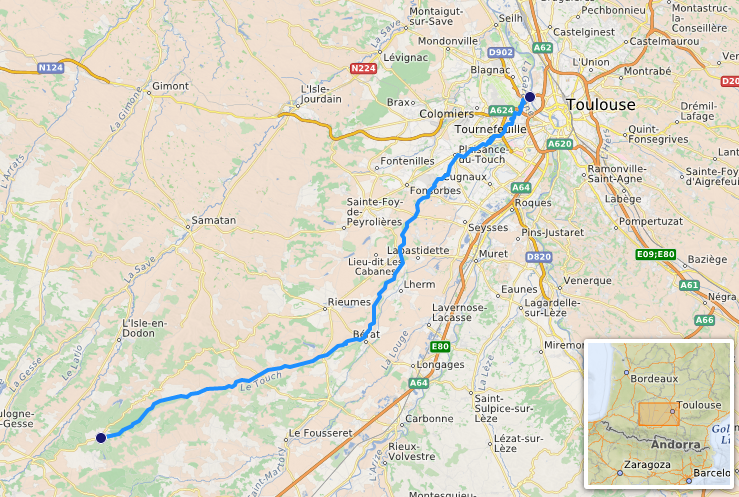

Location
- Country: France

Physical characteristics
- Source
  - location: Plateau de Lannemezan
  - coordinates: 43°17′01″N 0°48′45″E
  - elevation: 350 m (1,150 ft)
- Mouth
  - location: Garonne
  - coordinates: 43°37′22″N 01°24′01″E
  - elevation: 130 m (430 ft)
- Length: 74.5 km (46.3 mi)
- Basin size: 515 km^{2} (199 sq mi)
- Discharge
  - average: 3.92 m^{3}/s (138 cu ft/s)

Basin features
- Progression: Garonne→ Gironde estuary→ Atlantic Ocean

The Touch (French pronunciation: [tuʃ]; Occitan: Toish) is a 74.5 km (46.3 mi) long river in southwestern France, left tributary of the Garonne. Its source is in the département of Haute-Garonne, near Lilhac.

It flows through the following départements and towns:

- Haute-Garonne: Bérat, Lherm, Plaisance-du-Touch, Tournefeuille, Blagnac, Toulouse.

It flows into the river Garonne at Toulouse.
