= Passy Cemetery =

Cemetery in Paris, France

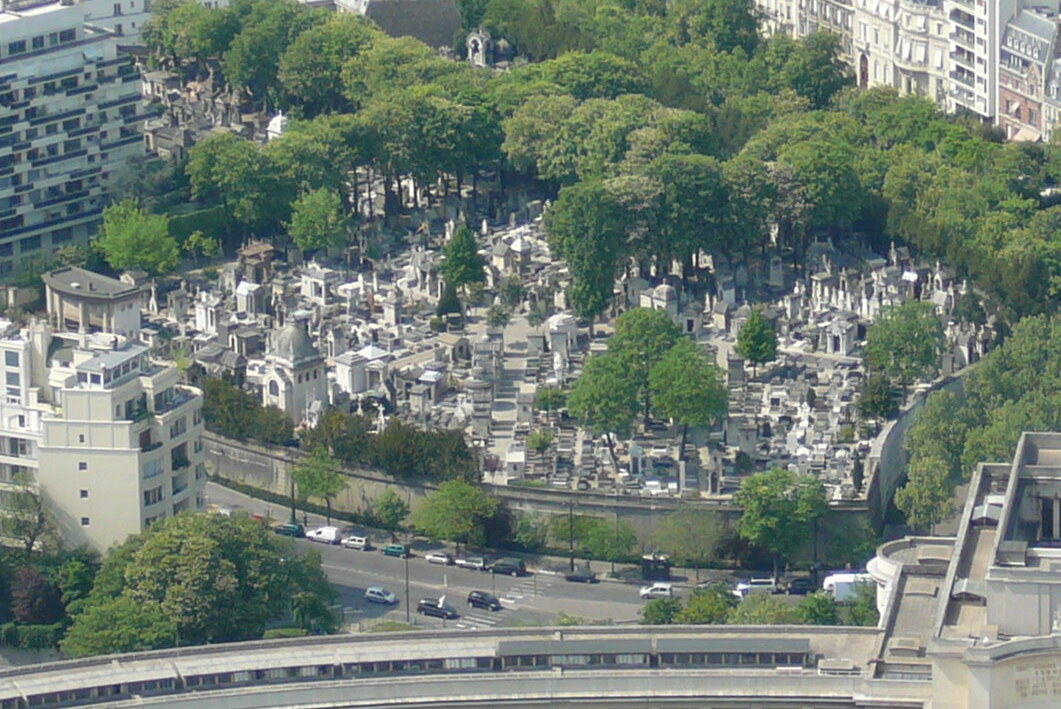
- Aerial view of Passy Cemetery
- Interactive map of Passy Cemetery

Details
- Established: 1820
- Location: Passy, Paris
- Country: France
- Coordinates: 48°51′45″N 2°17′07″E
- Type: Public
- Owned by: Mairie de Paris
- Size: 1.75 hectares (4.3 acres)
- No. of graves: 2600
- Website: Passy cemetery on the Mairie de Paris

Passy Cemetery (French: Cimetière de Passy) is a small cemetery in Passy, in the 16th arrondissement of Paris, France.

== History ==
The current cemetery replaced the old cemetery (l'ancien cimetière communal de Passy, located on Rue Lekain), which was closed in 1802.

In the early 19th century, on the orders of Napoleon I, Emperor of the French, all the cemeteries in Paris were replaced by several large new ones outside the precincts of the capital. Montmartre Cemetery was built in the north, Père Lachaise Cemetery in the east, and Montparnasse Cemetery in the south.

Opened in 1820 in the expensive residential and commercial districts of the Right Bank near the Champs-Élysées, by 1874 the small Passy Cemetery had become the aristocratic necropolis of Paris. It is the only cemetery in Paris to have a heated waiting-room.

The cemetery was once the home of a statue by Dunikowski titled The Soul Escaping the Body. It was on top of the ceremonial grave of Antoni Cierplikowski. The statue was known by many but was removed when the grave was cleared in 2004.

The current entrance (designed by René Berger) was built in 1934. The retaining wall of the cemetery is adorned with a bas relief (by Louis Janthial) commemorating the soldiers who fell in World War I.

== Location ==
The entrance of the cemetery is located at 2, Rue du Commandant Schlœsing. The street in which it is situated is named for a Free French pilot, Squadron Leader Jacques-Henri Schlœsing (1919–1944), who flew with the wartime RAF until killed in action, the day that Paris was liberated.

The cemetery is behind the Trocadéro.

Sheltered by a bower of chestnut trees, the cemetery is in the shadow of the Eiffel Tower.

== Notable interments ==
Among its more famous burials are:

- Louis Andrieux (1840–1931), French politician
- Édouard Balladur (1929–2026), Prime Minister of France
- Bảo Đại (1913–1997), the last Emperor of Vietnam
- Natalie Clifford Barney (1876–1972), Notable author, salonist and lesbian socialite of the Belle Époque
- Jean-Louis Barrault (1910–1994), actor and director; buried with his wife, the actress Madeleine Renaud
- Louis-Ernest Barrias (1841–1905), sculptor
- Jeanne Julia Bartet (1854–1941), actress
- Marie Bashkirtseff (1858–1884), Ukrainian painter famous for her published journal; her tomb is a recreation of her studio and has been declared a historical monument by the government of France
- Maurice Bellonte (1896–1983), pioneering aviator, as is his flight companion Dieudonné Costes
- James Gordon Bennett Jr. (1848–1918), American newspaper publisher, sportsman
- Tristan Bernard (1866–1947), playwright and novelist
- Henri Bernstein (1876–1953), actor
- Jacques-Emile Blanche (1861–1942), painter
- Esprit Blanche (1796–1852), psychiatrist and grandfather of painter Jacques-Emile Blanche.
- Isabella Eugénie Boyer (1841–1904), French-American model and heiress
- Princess Brasova (Natalia Sheremetyev-Romanov) (1880–1952), Russian wife of Grand Duke Mikhail Romanov
- George, Count Brasov (1910–1931), son of Grand Duke Mikhail Romanov and Princess Brasova (Natalia Sheremetyev-Romanov)
- Emmanuel de Las Cases (1766–1842), historian
- Louis Castex (1896–1968), aviator, politician, resistance fighter
- Dieudonné Costes (1896–1973), pioneering aviator, as is his flight companion Maurice Bellonte
- Emmanuelle de Dampierre (1913–2012), first wife of Infante Jaime, Duke of Segovia
- Marcel Dassault (1892–1986), engineer, founder of Dassault Aviation
- Claude Debussy (1862–1918), composer
- Maxime Dethomas (1867–1929), artist
- Ghislaine Dommanget (1900–1991), Princess of Monaco
- Michel Droit (1923–2000), novelist, member of the Académie française
- Henry Farman (1874–1958), British-French champion cyclist and aviator
- Edgar Faure (1908–1988), statesman and World War II resistance fighter
- Gabriel Fauré (1845–1924), composer
- Fernandel (Fernand Joseph Désiré Contandin) (1903–1971), comedy actor
- Maurice Gamelin (1872–1958), supreme commander of French armed forces 1939–1940
- Maurice Genevoix (1890–1980), novelist; his remains were transferred to the Panthéon in 2020
- Rosemonde Gérard (1871–1953), poet and playwright
- Virgil Gheorghiu (1916–1992), Romanian novelist
- Farideh Ghotbi (also known as Farideh Diba) (1921–2000), the mother of the former Shahbanu of Iran, Farah Diba
- Jean Giraudoux (1882–1944), playwright, soldier, and statesman
- Hubert de Givenchy (1927–2018), fashion designer
- Anna Gould (1878–1961), American socialite, daughter of financier Jay Gould
- Arlette Gueudet (1919–2012), widow of industrialist Robert Gueudet
- Jacques Guerlain (1874–1963), perfume creator from the House "Guerlain" in Paris
- Antonio Guzmán Blanco (1829–1899), Venezuelan politician and president
- Gabriel Hanotaux (1853–1944), statesman and historian
- Henriette Henriot (1857–1944), actress and artist's model
- Paul Hervieu (1857–1915), dramatist and novelist
- Gholam Hossein Jahanshahi (1920–2005), economist, Iranian statesman
- Jeanne Hugo (1869–1941), socialite and granddaughter of Victor Hugo
- Jacques Ibert (1890–1962), composer
- Paul Landowski (1875–1961), architect and sculptor
- Hector Lefuel (1810–1880), architect of the "Nouveau Louvre" expansion of the Louvre Palace
- Joseph Florimond Loubat (1831–1927), French-American bibliophile, antiquarian, sportsman, and philanthropist
- Albéric Magnard (1865–1914), composer
- Georges Mandel (1885–1944), statesman, French Resistance during World War II
- Édouard Manet (1832–1883), realist and impressionist painter
- André Messager (1853–1929), composer and conductor
- Alexandre Millerand (1859–1943), President of France
- Octave Mirbeau (1848–1917), anarchist, art critic, and novelist
- Berthe Morisot (1841–1895), impressionist painter
- Togrul Narimanbekov (1930–2013), Azerbaijani painter
- Joseph O'Kelly (1828–1885), Henri O'Kelly sr. (1859–1938), and Henri O'Kelly jr. (1881–1922), Franco-Irish composers and musicians
- Leila Pahlavi (1970–2001), Princess Leila of Iran, daughter of the last Shah of Iran and Farah Diba
- Gabrielle Réjane (1856–1920), actress
- Madeleine Renaud (1900–1994), actress; buried with her husband, the actor and director Jean-Louis Barrault
- Marcel Renault (1872–1903), industrialist, racing driver, co-founder of Renault motor company
- Maurice Rostand (1891–1968), playwright
- Constantin Rozanoff (1905–1954), colonel, test pilot
- Nicolas Skorsky (1952–2014), composer, lyricist, and music producer
- Haroun Tazieff (1914–1998), French-Belgian vulcanologist
- Renée Vivien (1877–1909), British writer, poet
- Pearl White (1889–1938), American silent film star, famous for doing her own stunts in her serials The Perils of Pauline
- Jean-Pierre Wimille (1908–1949), Grand Prix race driver

== Gallery ==
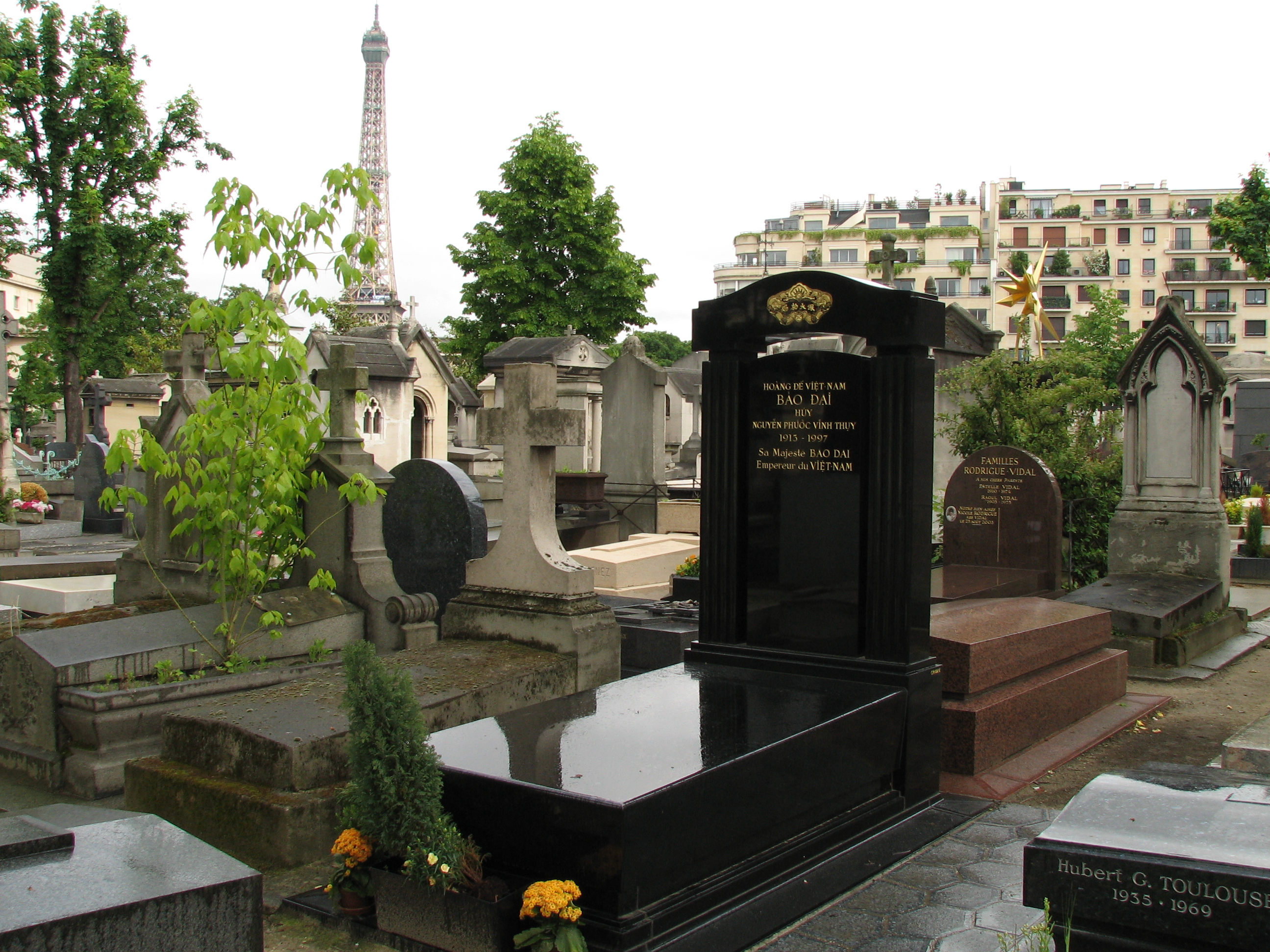
Grave of Bảo Đại, last Emperor of Vietnam

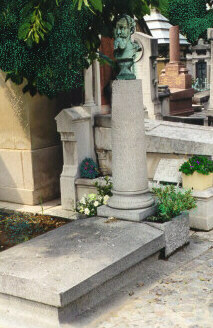
Grave of Édouard Manet

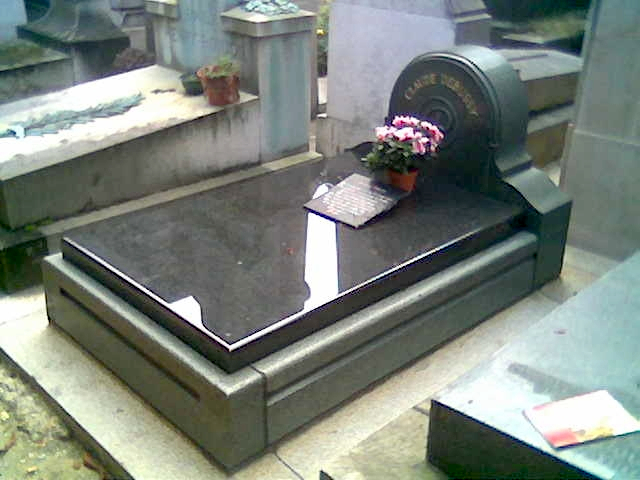
Grave of Claude Debussy

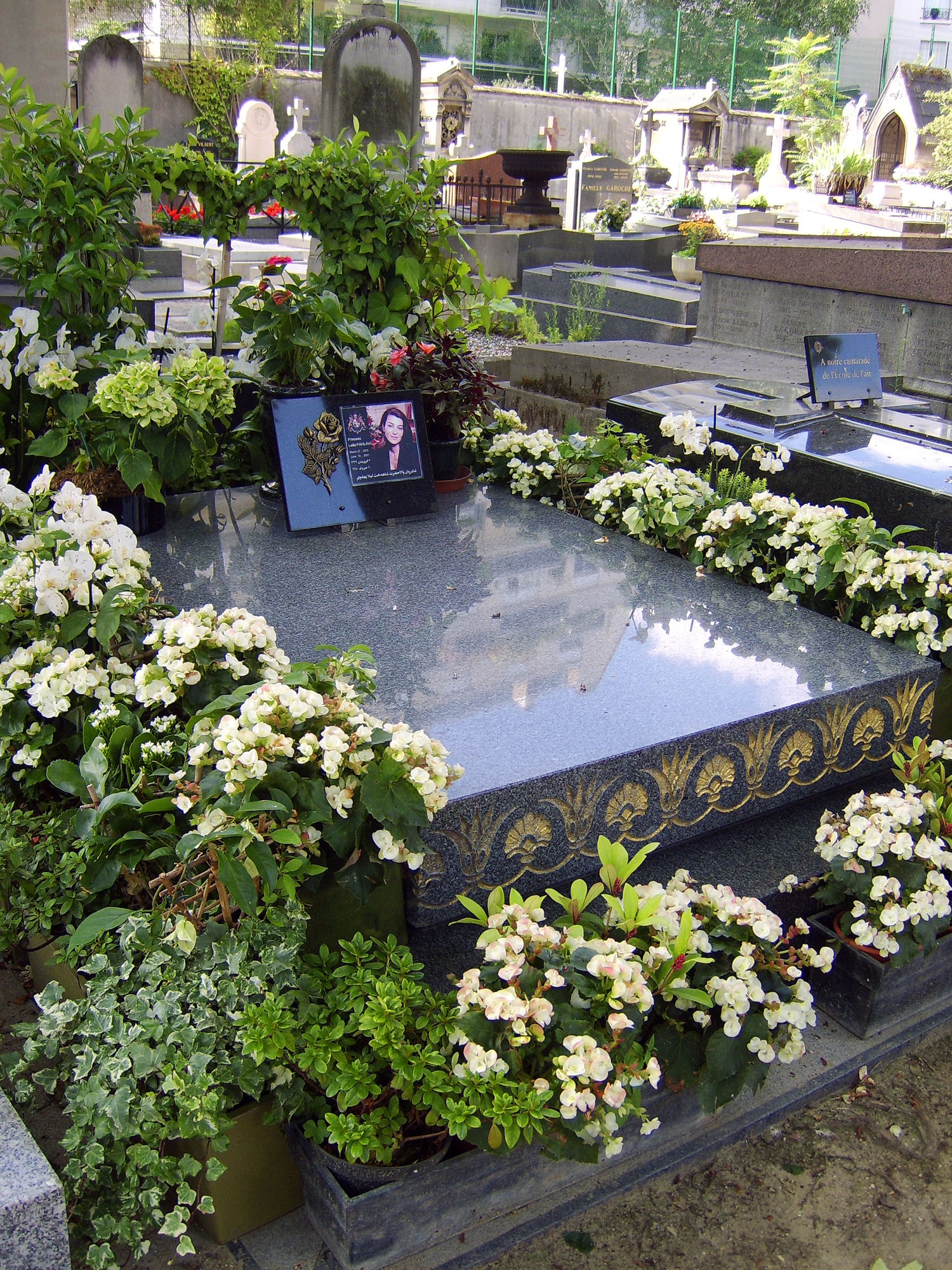
Grave of Leila Pahlavi

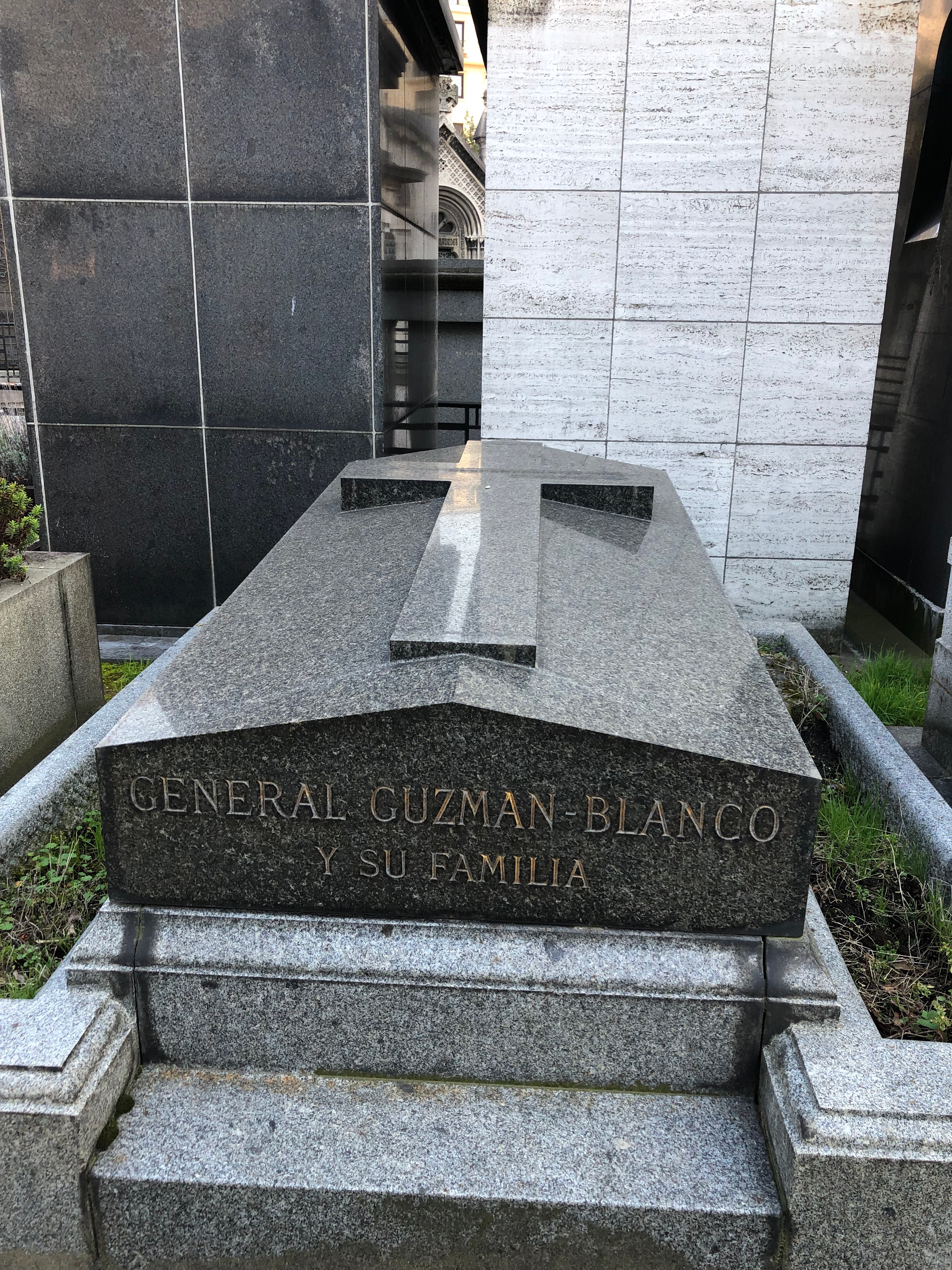
Grave of Antonio Guzmán Blanco

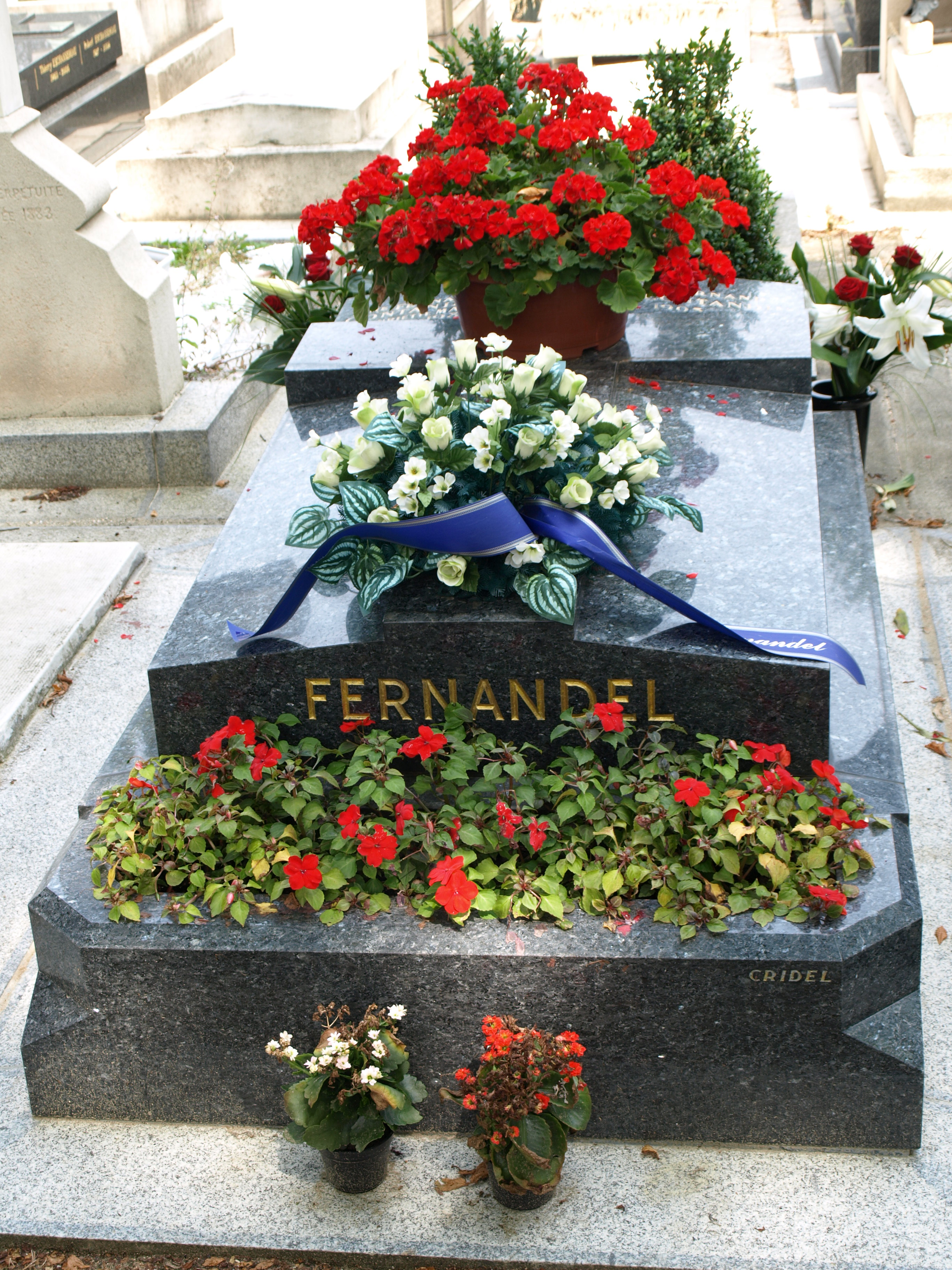
Grave monument of Fernandel

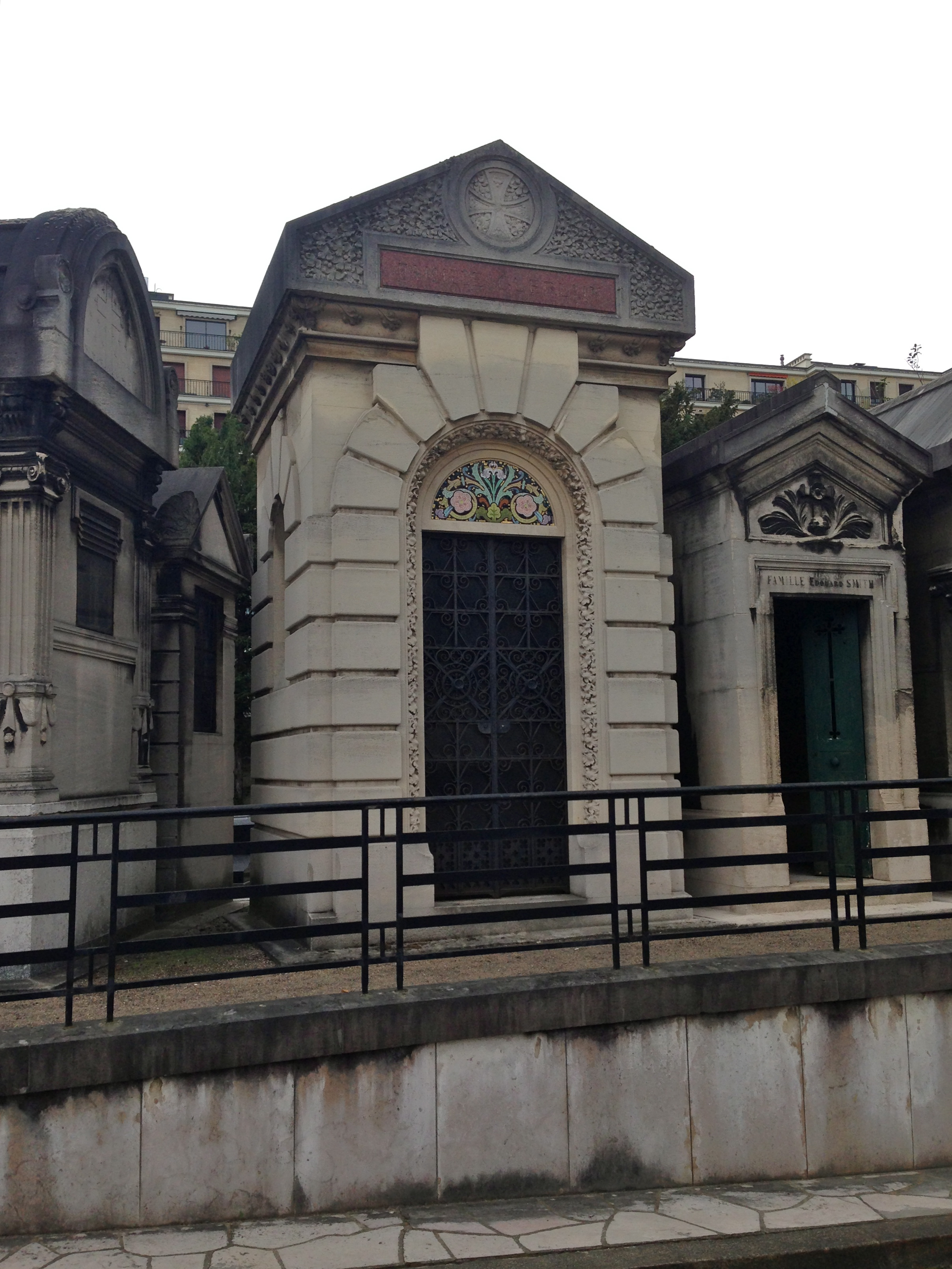
Mausoleum of the Guerlain clan

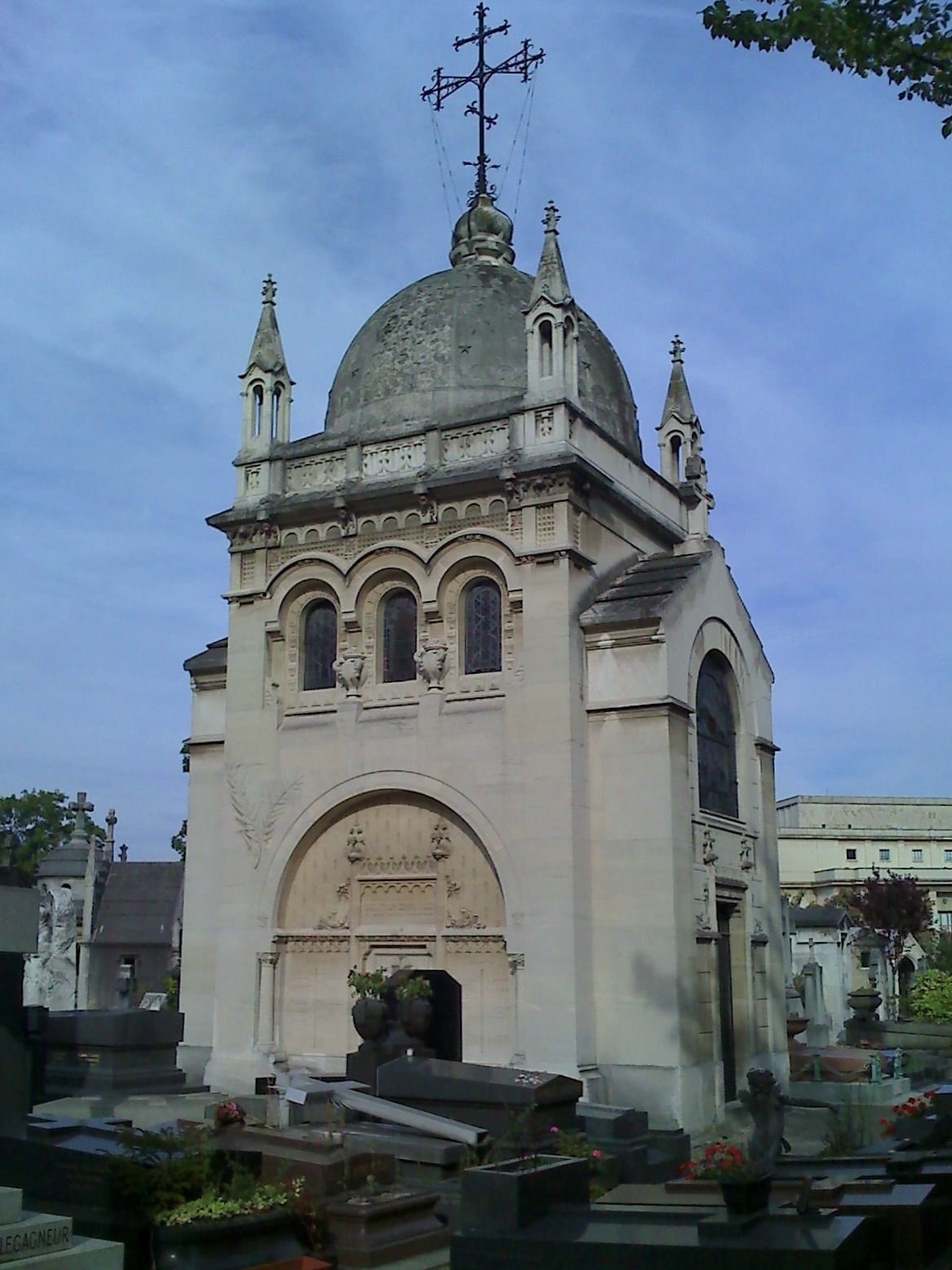
Tomb of Marie Bashkirtseff, a recreation of her studio
