= Jean Rostand =

French biologist and philosopher (1894-1977)

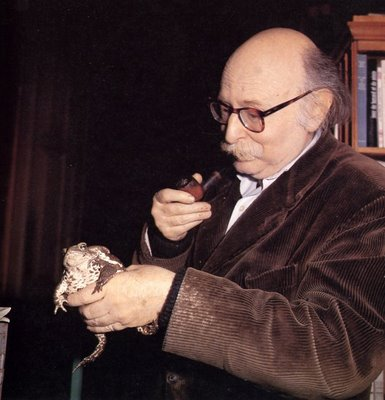
- Born: 30 October 1894; Paris, France
- Died: 4 September 1977 (aged 82); Ville-d'Avray, Hauts-de-Seine, France
- Known for: Member of the Académie française
- Parent(s): Edmond Rostand; Rosemonde Gérard
- Relatives: Maurice Rostand (brother)
- Awards: Kalinga Prize (1959)

Jean Edmond Cyrus Rostand (30 October 1894 – 4 September 1977) was a French biologist, historian of science, and philosopher.

Active as an experimental biologist, Rostand became famous for his work as a science writer, as well as a philosopher and an activist. His scientific work covered a variety of biological fields such as amphibian embryology, parthenogenesis and teratogeny, while his literary output extended into popular science, history of science and philosophy. His work in the area of cryogenics gave the idea of cryonics to Robert Ettinger. He took an interest in ethics and morality in biology and wrote against pseudoscience, the use of science for war, wrote against racism and supported human equality and freedom.

== Early life ==
Rostand was born in Paris to playwright Edmond Rostand and poet Rosemonde Gérard. He was the brother of novelist and playwright Maurice Rostand. His paternal grandfather Eugène Rostand was a political scientist and economist. The family moved to Cambo-les-Bains in 1900. Rostand grew up with a fascination for natural history in these surroundings. He was educated by home tutors and read the works of J. H. Fabre, Claude Bernard, and Charles Darwin. He then studied natural sciences at the University of Sorbonne and graduated in 1914.

== Academic career ==
Rostand's biological research began with work on paedogenesis in flies, studies on silkworms and dragonflies before beginning to work on embryology in frogs. In 1910 he was able to induce parthenogenesis in the eggs of Rana temporaria. He then examined polydactyly and its induction by chemical agents in frogs and studied the preservation of sperm vitality using glycerine. He also examined the determination of sex in frogs. For his work in biology he received the Henry de Parville Prize in 1934 and the Binoux Prize in 1941.

Following in the footsteps of his father, Rostand was elected to the Académie française in 1959.

Rostand took a special interest in the history of science and especially stressed the slow process by which scientific facts were determined and how they emerged from the interactions of numerous people and highlighted the need for modesty, especially because of the fallibility of individual workers. For his work in the popularization of science he received a Kalinga Prize in 1959.

Rostand is famous for the quotation: "Kill one man, and you are a murderer. Kill millions of men, and you are a conqueror. Kill them all, and you are a God" from Thoughts of a Biologist, 1938.

In the preface of the 1959 Italian edition of his Artificial man, Rostand foresaw artificial oviparity, gender mutation, virgin births, as well as DNA modifications before and after the birth.

== Personal life ==
Rostand was active in several causes, in particular against nuclear proliferation and the death penalty. An agnostic, he demonstrated humanist convictions. He wrote several books on the question of eugenism and the responsibilities of mankind regarding its own fate and its place in nature.

Rostand married a cousin Andrée Mante in 1920 and they had a son François who became a mathematician. After 1922, he set up a laboratory in his home at Ville d’Avray and began to conduct most of his research there, free of institutional demands. He would meet people from a wide range of interests at his home on Sundays. He died following prolonged ill-health at home.

Rostand Island in Antarctica is named after him.

== Works ==
- Le retour des pauvres , 1919 - Return of the poor
- La loi des riches, 1920 - The law of the rich
- Pendant qu’on souffre encore, 1921 - While suffering endures
- Ignace ou l'Écrivain , 1923 - Ignace or the writer
- Deux angoisses : la mort, l’amour, 1924 - Two anguishes: love and death
- De la vanité et de quelques autres sujets , 1925 - Of vanity and several other subjects
- Les familiotes et autres essais de mystique bourgeoise, 1925 - The familiotes and other essays of the bourgeois mystique
- De l’amour des idées , 1926 - On the love of ideas
- Le mariage, 1927 - Marriage
- Valère ou l’Exaspéré, 1927 - Valère or The exasperated
- Julien ou Une conscience, 1928 - Julien or A conscience
- Les chromosomes, artisans de l’hérédité et du sexe, 1929 - Chromosomes, artisans of heredity and sex
- De la mouche à l’Homme, 1930 - From fly to man
- L’état présent du transformisme, 1931 - The current state of transformism
- Journal d’un caractère, 1931 - Journal of a character
- L’Évolution des espèces, 1932 - The evolution of species
- Les problèmes de l’hérédité et du sexe, 1933 - The problems of heredity and sex
- L’aventure humaine, 1933 - The human adventure
- La vie des libellules, 1935 - The life of dragonflies
- Insectes, 1936 - Insects
- La nouvelle biologie, 1937 - The new biology
- Biologie et médecine, 1938 - Biology and medicine
- Hérédité et racisme, 1938 - Heredity and racism
- Pensée d’un biologiste, 1938 - Thoughts from a biologist
- La vie et ses problèmes, 1938 - Life and its problems
- Science et génération, 1940 - Science and generation
- Les idées nouvelles de la génétique, 1941 - New ideas in genetics
- L’Homme, introduction à l’étude de la biologie humaine , 1941 - Man, introduction to the study of human biology
- L’Homme, maître de la vie, 1941 - Man, master of life
- Hommes de vérité, 1942 - Men of truth
- L’avenir de la biologie, 1943 - The future of biology
- La genèse de la vie, histoire des idées sur la génération spontanée , 1943 - Genesis of life, a history of the ideas on spontaneous generation
- La vie des vers à soie , 1944 - The life of silkworms
- Esquisse d’une histoire de la biologie , 1945 - Sketch of a history of biology
- L’avenir de la biologie, 1946 - The future of biology
- Qu’est-ce qu’un enfant ?, 1946 - What is a child?
- Charles Darwin, 1947
- Nouvelles pensées d’un biologiste, 1947 - New thoughts from a biologist
- L’hérédité humaine , 1948 - Human heredity
- Hommes de vérité II , 1948 - Men of truth II
- La biologie et l’avenir humain, 1949 - Biology and the human future
- L’Homme devant la biologie, 1949 - Man facing biology
- La parthénogenèse, reproduction virginale chez les animaux, 1949 - Parthenogenesis, virginal reproduction in animals
- La parthénogenèse animale, 1949 - Animal parthenogenesis
- La génétique des batraciens, 1951 - Batrachian genetics
- Les grands courants de la biologie , 1951 - Great trends in biology
- Les origines de la biologie expérimentale et l’abbé Spallanzani, 1951 - The origins of experimental biology and the Abbé Spallanzani
- L’hérédité humaine, 1952 - Human heredity
- Pages d’un moraliste , 1952 - Pages by a moralist
- Ce que nous apprennent les crapauds et les grenouilles, 1953 - What toads and frogs teach us
- La vie, cette aventure, 1953 - Life, that adventure
- Ce que je crois, 1953 - What I believe
- Instruire sur l’Homme, 1953 - To instruct on Man
- Notes d’un biologiste , 1954 - Notes from a biologist
- Les crapauds et les grenouilles et quelques grands problèmes biologiques, 1955 - Toads, frogs and a few great problems in biology
- Le problème biologique de l’individu, 1955 - The biological problem of the individual
- L’Homme en l’an 2000, 1956 - Man in the year 2000
- Peut-on modifier l’Homme?, 1956 - Can we modify Man?
- L’atomisme en biologie, 1956 - Atomism in biology
- Bestiaire d’amour, 1958 - A bestiary of love
- Aux sources de la biologie, 1958 - At the sources of biology
- Anomalies des amphibiens anoures, 1958 - Anomalies of anurian amphibians
- Science fausse et fausses sciences, 1958 - Erroneous science and false science
- Les origines de la biologie expérimentale, 1959 - Origins of experimental biology
- Carnet d’un biologiste, 1959 - Notepad of a biologist
- Espoirs et inquiétudes de l’homme, 1959 - The hopes and worries of Man
