= Louis Castex =

French aviator, politician and author, born 1896

Castex, Louis
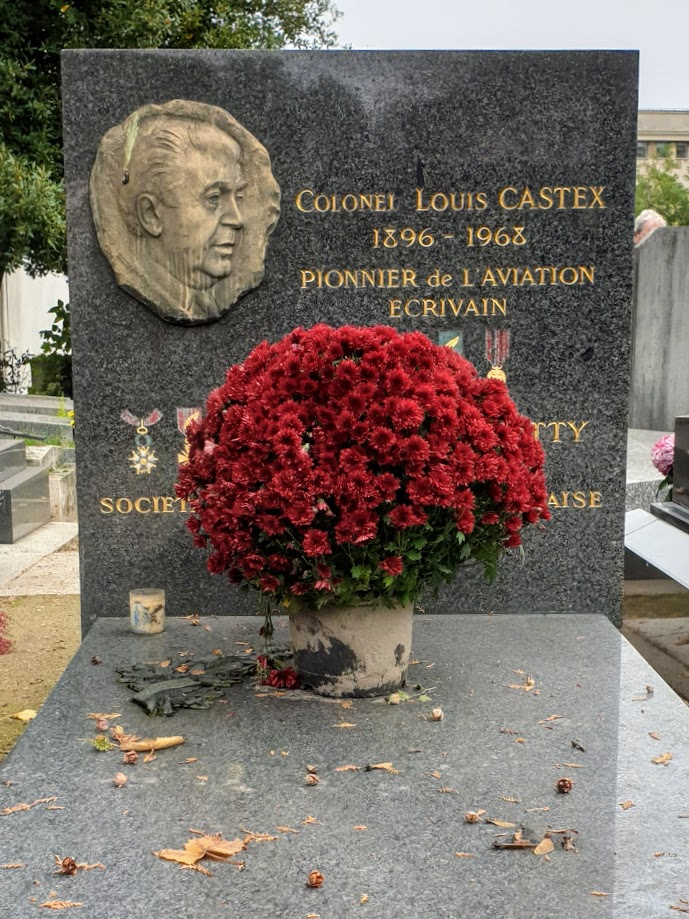
- Grave of Louis Castex at the Cimetière de Passy
- Born: Louis Joseph Marie Nestor Castex; February 3, 1896; Pinsaguel, Haute-Garonne, France
- Died: September 28, 1968 (aged 72); Paris
- Occupations: French pilot, journalist

Louis Joseph Marie Nestor Castex (born February 3, 1896, in Pinsaguel, Haute-Garonne, France; died September 28, 1968, in Paris) was a French aviation pioneer, politician, pilot, and author. He is best known for his travel writing in the mid-20th century.

== Life ==
Castex studied law and graduated with a Licencié en droit (Bachelor of Laws). He participated in World War I, conducting several reconnaissance flights and achieving the rank of Colonel.

He became the Director of Transatlantic Services for Air France and befriended Antoine de Saint-Exupéry. He collaborated with Georges Mandel, the French Minister of Posts and later a member of the Résistance.

One day before the German invasion of the Netherlands, Belgium, and Luxembourg and the start of the Western Front of World War II in Western Europe, Castex embarked on a round-the-world flight in an aircraft. He later documented this journey in his award-winning book Mon tour du monde en avion (1945). Starting from Paris, he flew in a Dewoitine D.338 (F-ARIB Ville de Bangkok) of Air France, with numerous layovers, initially to French colony French Indochina in Saigon. He spent several days there and then continued to Hanoi. From there, he flew with an De Havilland DH.86 Express (mistakenly referred to as a De Havilland DH.84 Dragon) of Imperial Airways to Hong Kong, where he stayed for an extended period. In January 1941, he returned to Saigon with Air France. In February 1941, he flew with a Douglas (DC–2 or DC-3) of KNILM (Koninklijke Nederlandsch-Indische Luchtvaart Maatschappij) further via Singapore (staying at the Raffles Hotel) to Batavia, where he met, among others, Evert van Dijk, who, in 1930, had crossed the North Atlantic non-stop from east to west with Charles Kingsford Smith in the Southern Cross. Castex continued to Bali, where he visited the house of Belgian painter Adrien Jean Le Mayeur de Merpes in Sanur, and from there, he flew to Australia. After a few days in Sydney, he flew in early March 1941 in a Boeing 314 Clipper of Pan American World Airways to Auckland and from there continued with Harold Gatty via Nouméa, Canton Island Airport, where Noël Coward joined, to Hawaii. There, he visited the US naval base Pearl Harbor a few months before the Japanese attack; among other things, he saw the Boeing B-17 Flying Fortress. Castex continued to San Francisco and Los Angeles, where he was invited to social events by Robert Hakim and Jean Renoir. In a Boeing 307 Stratoliner, he continued to Chicago, New York City, and Washington, D.C.. In early July 1941, he once again took off in a Boeing 314 Clipper with layovers on the Bermuda Islands and Faial to Lisbon. At the end of July, he departed from there to Gibraltar, where he stayed for a week, and in early August, in a Caudron C.440 Goéland, he continued via Oran to Algiers to circumvent Spain, which was allied with Germany during the war. From Algiers, he finally returned to Marseille in the Dewoitine D.338 (F-ARIB Ville de Bangkok), where he had started his journey, on August 10, 1941, concluding his round-the-world trip in commercial aviation aircraft.

In 1952, he became a member of the Assemblée de l’Union française.

In October 1953, he was involved in the inauguration of the first air link between Papeete and the Marquesas Islands in a Grumman G-73.

Louis Castex was buried at the Cimetière de Passy in Paris.

== Awards ==
- Croix de Guerre
- Médaille de la Résistance Française
- Grand Officier de l’ Ordre National de la Légion d'honneur
- 1946: Prix Marcelin Guérin from the Académie française for his book Mon tour du monde en avion.
- Since 1969, the Académie française annually awards the Prix Louis Castex.

== Selected Writings ==
- L’Amérique devant le conflit. Impressions et souvenirs 1941
- Mon tour du monde en avion. Carnet de notes tenu au jour le jour sur 50 000 km de vol, Paris: Librairie Plon 1945.
  - German translation: Mein Flug um die Welt, Translation by Ernst Christ and Leonore Schlaich, Stuttgart: Deutsche Verlagsanstalt 1948.
- L’âge de l’air. 25 ans d’aviation commerciale dans le monde, 1920–1945. Preface by Henri Farman. Paris: É. Chiron 1946.
- La Vérité sur l’aviation civile française en 1948, 1948
- L’homme qui donna des ailes au monde Clément Ader, Paris: Librairie Plon 1947.
- En mission aux îles australes, 1951
- Clément Ader ou l’enfant qui voulait se faire oiseau, 1957
- Îles, relais du ciel, Union Générale d’Édition 1964
- Les secrets de l’île de pâques, Paris: Hachette 1966.
  - Spanish: Los secretos de la Isla de Pascua, Santiago de Chile: J. Almendros 1968
- De Clément Ader à Gagarine, Paris: Hachette 1967.
- A. MM. les membres de l’Assemblée Nationale et du Conseil de la République. Un large débat sur l’aviation s’impose
