= Maurice Rostand =

French author (1891–1968)

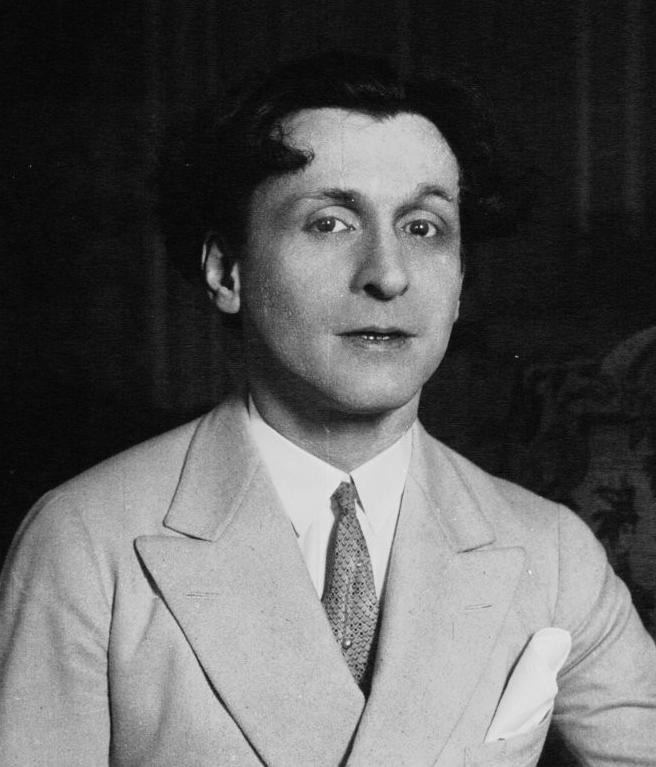
- Maurice Rostand in 1928
- Born: 26 May 1891; Paris, France
- Died: 21 February 1968 (aged 76); Ville-d'Avray, France
- Occupations: Novelist, dramatist, poet

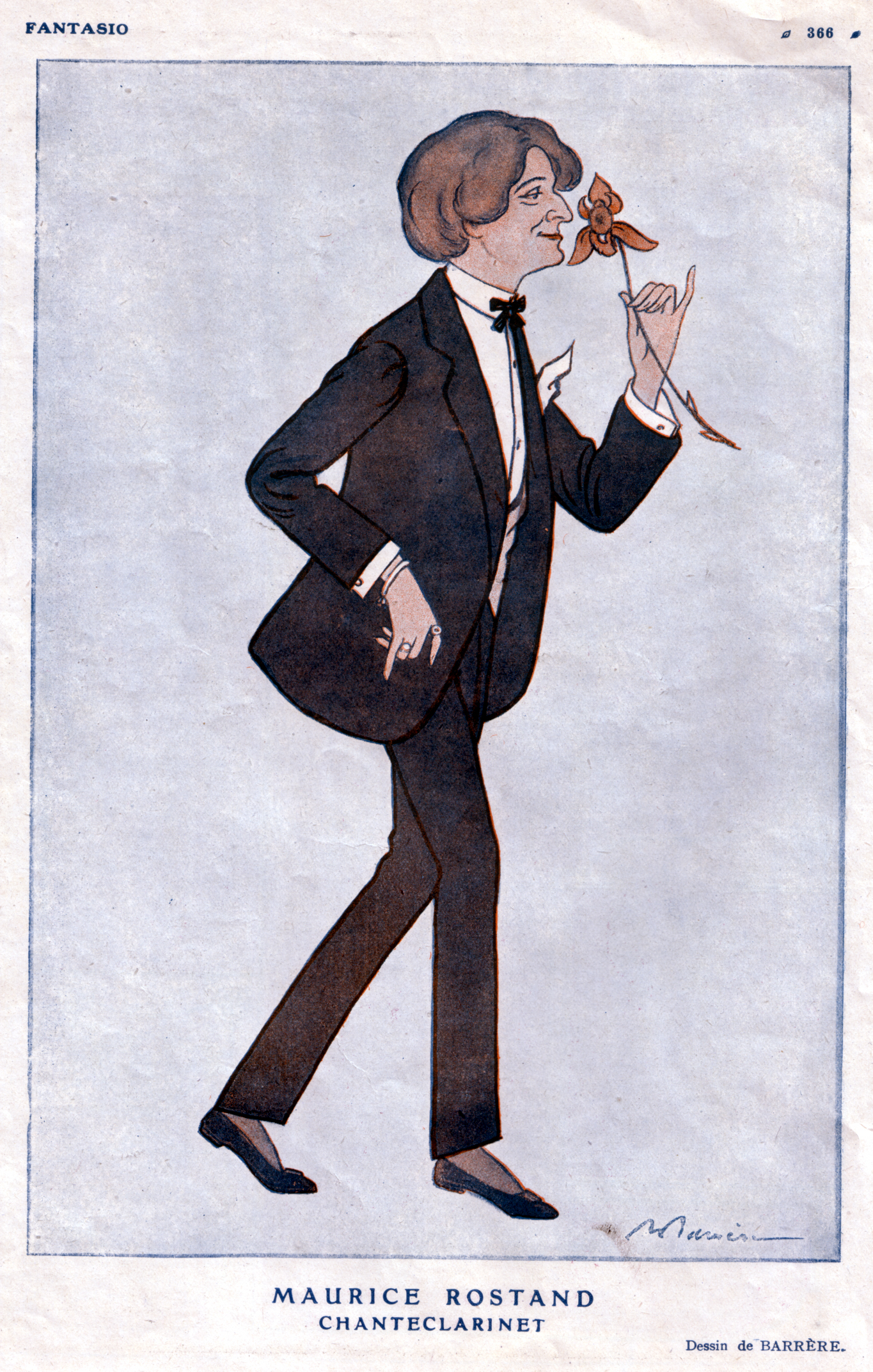
Caricature of Rostand by Barrère

Maurice Rostand (26 May 1891 – 21 February 1968) was a French author, the son of the poet and dramatist Edmond Rostand and the poet Rosemonde Gérard, and brother of the biologist Jean Rostand.

Rostand was a writer of poems, novels, and plays. He was friends with Jean Cocteau and Lucien Daudet and was one of the homosexual personalities who frequented the salons during the period between the wars. Rostand was defined as a pacifist and a leftist whose ideas bore him the hate of the far-right press, which mocked his homosexuality, particularly L'Action française and Émile Buré's L'Ordre.

In 1948, he published his memoirs, Confession d'un demi-siècle. He is interred in Passy Cemetery.

== Works ==
=== Plays ===
- La Gloire, 1921
- La Mort de Molière, Théâtre Sarah Bernhardt, 1922
- Le Masque de fer, 1923
- Le Secret du Sphinx, pièce en 4 actes, 1924
- Monsieur de Letoriere: Piece en Quatre Actes et Cinq Tableaux en Vers, 1931
- Le procès d'Oscar Wilde, 1935

Some works were written in collaboration with his mother, Rosemonde Gérard.

=== Other ===
- Les Insomnies Poemes 1914–1923, 1923
- L'homme que j'ai tué, 1925
- Confession d'un demi-siècle, 1948
- Sarah Bernhardt, 1950

=== Biography ===
- Marcel Migeo: Les Rostand, Paris, Stock, 1973. About Edmond, Rosemonde, Jean and Maurice Rostand.
