= Edmond Rostand =

French poet and dramatist (1868–1918)

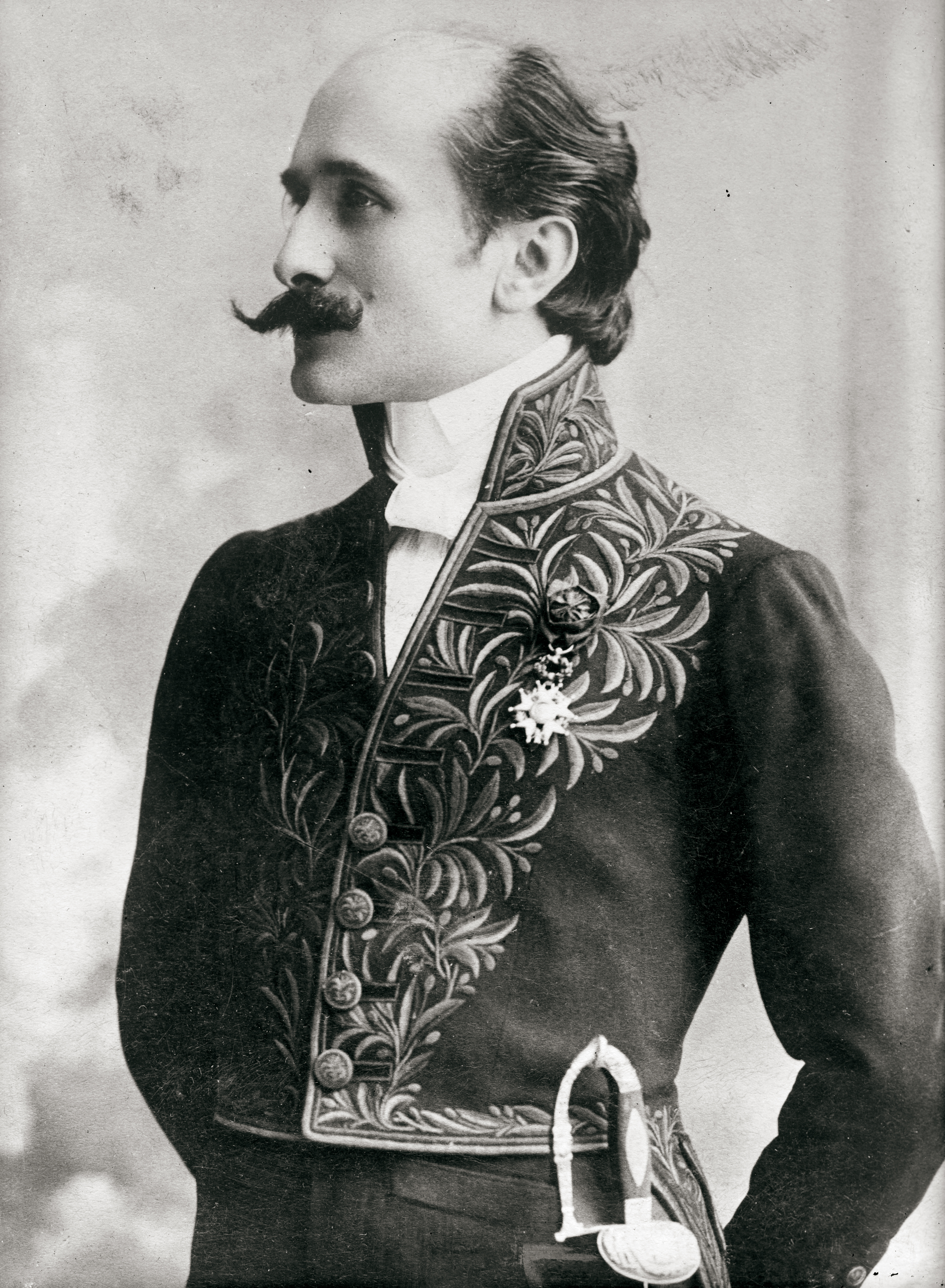
- Rostand in the uniform of the Académie française, 1903
- Born: Edmond Eugène Alexis Rostand; 1 April 1868; Marseille, France
- Died: 2 December 1918 (aged 50); Paris, France
- Occupations: Poet, playwright
- Spouse: Rosemonde Gérard
- Children: Jean Rostand; Maurice Rostand
- Writing career
- Literary movement: Neo-romanticism

Edmond Eugène Alexis Rostand (UK: /ˈrɒstɒ̃/, US: /rɔːˈstɒ̃, ˈrɒstænd/, French: [ɛdmɔ̃ ʁɔstɑ̃]; 1 April 1868 – 2 December 1918) was a French poet and dramatist. He is associated with neo-romanticism and is known best for his 1897 play Cyrano de Bergerac. Rostand's romantic plays contrasted with the naturalistic theatre popular during the late nineteenth century. Another of Rostand's works, Les Romanesques (1894), was adapted to the 1960 musical comedy The Fantasticks.

== Early life ==
Rostand was born in Marseille, France, into a wealthy and cultured Provençal family. His father was an economist, a poet who translated and edited the works of Catullus, and a member of the Marseille Academy and the Institut de France. Rostand studied literature, history, and philosophy at the Collège Stanislas in Paris, France.

== Career ==
When Rostand was twenty years old, his first play, a one-act comedy, Le Gant rouge, was performed at the Cluny Theatre, 24 August 1888, but it was almost unnoticed.

He and his fiancée Rosemonde Gérard became friends with Emmanuel Chabrier in 1889, and the composer quickly set three of his poems (and two of hers) to music; the following year the two collaborated on À la musique for the house-warming of a mutual friend. In 1890, Rostand published a volume of poems called Les Musardises. The same year he offered a one-act Pierrot play in verse to the director of the Théâtre François. This gave him the opportunity to write for the state theatre a three-act play, also in verse, as are all Rostand's plays. He considered himself a poet, whether writing plays or poetry.

The resulting play, Les Romanesques, was produced at the Théâtre François on 21 May 1894. It was a great success and was the start of his career as a dramatist. This play would be adapted in 1960 by Tom Jones and Harvey Schmidt into the long-running American musical The Fantasticks.

Rostand's next play was written for Sarah Bernhardt. La Princesse Lointaine was based on the story of the 12th-century troubadour Jaufre Rudel and his love for Hodierna of Jerusalem (who is the archetypal princesse lointaine character). This idealistic play opened on 5 April 1895, at the Théâtre de la Renaissance. The part of Melisandre (based on Hodierna's daughter Melisende of Tripoli) was created by Sarah Bernhardt but the play was not particularly successful. When Bernhardt performed it in London later the same year, it received a bad review from George Bernard Shaw but this was not surprising considering Shaw's bias for realism. Rambaldo di Vaqueiras: I Monferrato, 1922 1922 verse drama by Nino Berrini^{(it)} is based on La Princesse Lointaine.

Bernhardt, undeterred, asked Rostand to write another play for her. She created the role of Photine in La Samaritaine (Theatre de la Renaissance, 14 April 1897), a Biblical drama in three scenes adapted from the gospel story of the woman of Samaria. This play was more successful and became part of Sarah Bernhardt's repertoire. Rostand felt satisfied that he had proven to the public that he was something more than a writer of comedies.

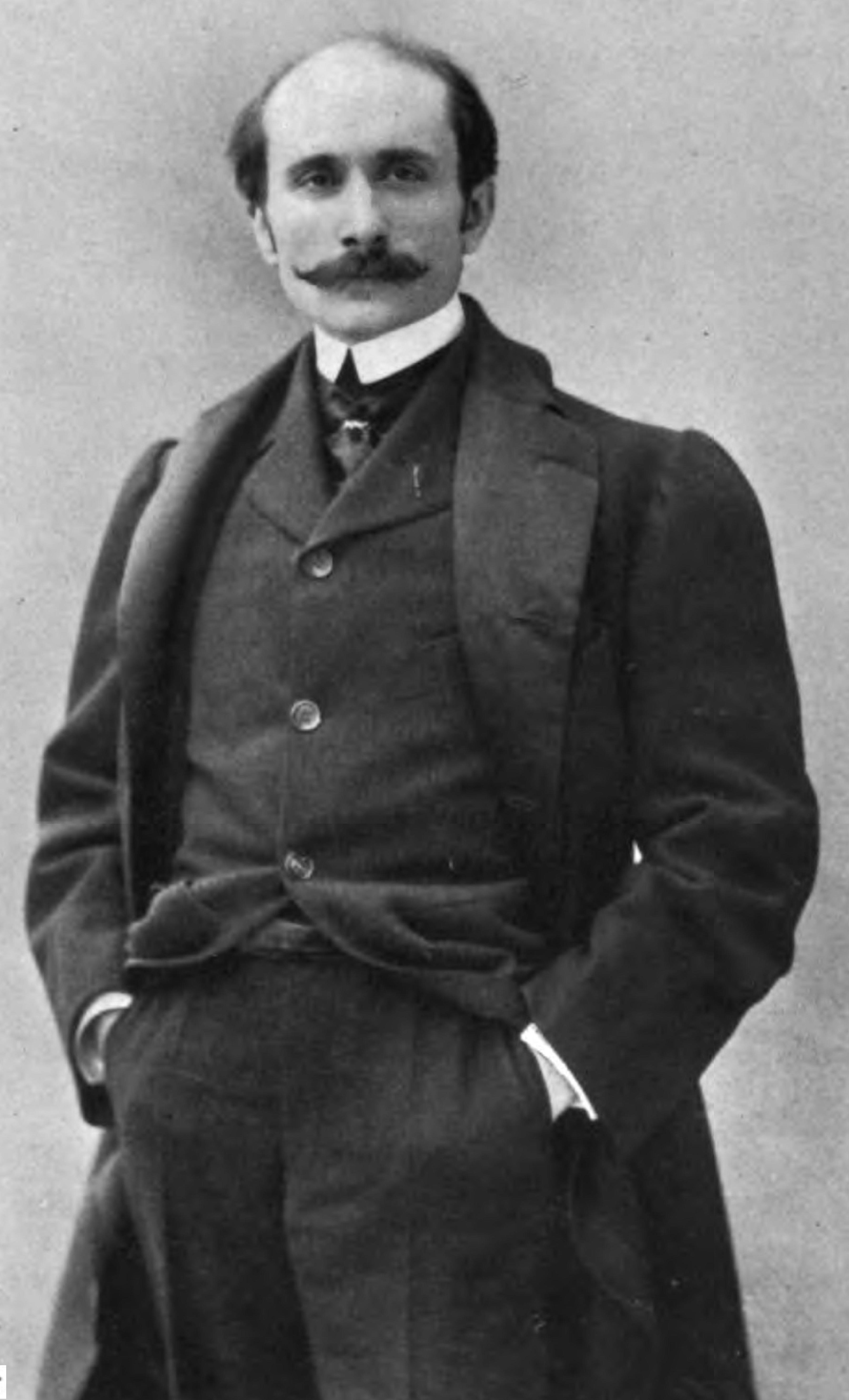
Edmond Rostand, aged 29, at the time of the first performance of Cyrano, 1898

The production of his heroic comedy Cyrano de Bergerac (28 December 1897, Théâtre de la Porte Saint-Martin), with Benoît-Constant Coquelin in the title role, was a triumph. The first production lasted for more than 300 consecutive nights. No such enthusiasm for a drama in verse had been known since the time of Hugo's Hernani. The play was quickly translated into English, German, Russian and other European languages. Cyrano de Bergerac had been a boyhood hero of Rostand, who loved his idealism and courage. He had also thoroughly researched French 17th-century history.

The play L'Aiglon was written for Sarah Bernhardt to perform during the Exposition Universelle in Paris. A patriotic subject was required, and Rostand chose a subject from Napoleonic history, suggested probably by Henri Welschinger's Roi de Rome, 1811–32 (1897), which contained much new information about the unhappy life of the Duke of Reichstadt, son of Napoleon I, and Marie Louise, surveilled by agents of Metternich at the Schönbrunn Palace. L'Aiglon, a verse drama in six acts, was produced (15 March 1900) by Sarah Bernhardt at her own theatre, she herself performing the trouser role of the Duke of Reichstadt.

In 1901, Rostand became the youngest writer ever to be elected to the Académie française. He relocated to Cambo-les-bains, in the Basque Pyrenees, in 1903 for health reasons. Here he built himself a villa, Arnaga (now a Rostand museum) and worked on his next play, one for Constant Coquelin this time, Chantecler. Produced in February 1910, it was awaited with an interest, enhanced by considerable delay in the production, which affected the enthusiasm of its reception. Nor did the Parisian audience enjoy the caricature of salon life in the third act. Since Constant Coquelin had died during rehearsals, Lucien Guitry was in the title role and Mme. Simone played the part of the pheasant. Chantecler is a cockerel and the characters are birds and animals. "Chantecler" is the great play of Rostand's maturity, expressing Rostand's own deepest feelings as a poet and idealist.

The Romancers one act play is one of Edmond Rostand's most famous plays. This play is found to be read for study in the courses of many universities of the world.

When he died prematurely at fifty years old, Rostand was still writing plays. "La Dernière Nuit de Don Juan" was performed posthumously in 1922. There were two unfinished and unpublished plays – Yorick and Les Petites Manies.

== Personal life ==
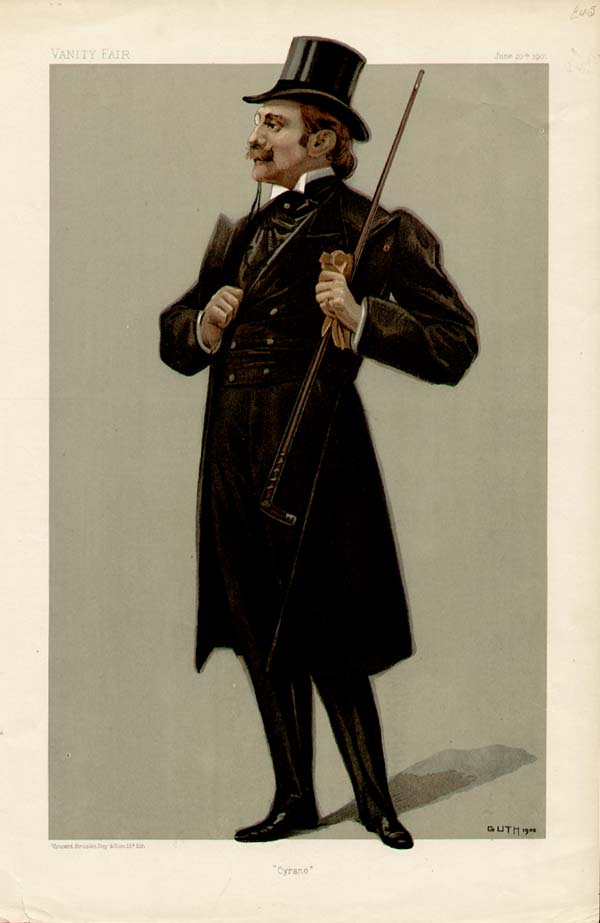
Rostand by Guth in 1901

Rostand was married to the poet and playwright Rosemonde-Étiennette Gérard who, in 1890, published Les Pipeaux: a volume of verse commended by the Academy. The couple had two sons, Jean and Maurice.

During the 1900s, Rostand came to live in the Villa Arnaga in Cambo-les-Bains in the French Basque Country, seeking a cure for his pleurisy. The house is now a heritage site and a museum of Rostand's life and Basque architecture and crafts. Rostand died in 1918, a victim of the flu pandemic, and is buried in the Cimetière de Marseille.

== Works ==
- Le Gant rouge, 1888 (The Red Glove)
- Les Musardises, 1890
- Les Deux Pierrots, ou Le Souper blanc (The Two Pierrots, or The White Supper), 1891
- Les Romanesques, 1894 (basis for the 1960 off-Broadway musical The Fantasticks The All-Too-Romantics"), verse translation by Thom Christoph (Genge Press, 2024)
- La Princesse Lointaine (The Princess Far-Away), 1895
- La Samaritaine (The Woman of Samaria), 1897
- Cyrano de Bergerac, 1897
- L'Aiglon: A Play in Six Acts. 1900
- Chantecler: A Play in Four Acts, 1910
- La Dernière Nuit de Don Juan (The Last Night of Don Juan, in Poetic Drama), 1921
- Le Cantique de L'Aile, 1922
- Le Vol de la Marseillaise, 1922

== See also ==
- Ary Bitter

== Sources ==
- Edmond Rostand: Cyrano de Bergerac, Nick Hern Books, London, 1991. ISBN 978-1-85459-117-3
- Henry James in vol. 84, pp. 477 seq. The Cornhill Magazine.
- Marcel Migeo: Les Rostand, Paris, Stock, 1973. About Edmond, his wife Rosemonde, and their sons Jean and Maurice Rostand.
- Sue Lloyd: The Man who was Cyrano, a Life of Edmond Rostand, Creator of 'Cyrano de Bergerac', Genge Press, USA, 2003; UK 2007. ISBN 978-0-9549043-1-9 Kindle version now available.
