= Rosemonde Gérard =

French poet and playwright

Rosemonde Gérard

Louise-Rose-Étiennette Gérard, known as Rosemonde Gérard (April 5, 1866, Paris – July 8, 1953, Paris) was a French poet and playwright. She was the wife of Edmond Rostand (1868–1918, author of Cyrano de Bergerac), and was a granddaughter of Étienne Maurice Gérard, who was a Marshal and a Prime Minister of France.

Gérard is perhaps best known today as the author of the lines:

Car, vois-tu, chaque jour je t’aime davantage,

Aujourd’hui plus qu’hier et bien moins que demain.

(For, you see, each day I love you more,

Today more than yesterday and less than tomorrow.)

A "+ qu'hier − que demain" pendant from about 1930. "A.Augis" is visible on the left edge of the central area.

This couplet is taken from a poem, variously known as "L'éternelle chanson" ("The Eternal Song") or "Les Vieux" ("The Old Ones"), that she wrote to Rostand in 1889. The poem was published in 1890, but did not enjoy immediate success. The phrase became celebrated as an expression of ever-growing love when, in 1907 (17 years after its publication), a Lyonnais jeweler, Alphonse Augis, had the idea of making a medallion with the core portion of the verse engraved on it. The medallions became quite popular, and led to the production of other, similarly decorated jewelry items, such as earrings and matchboxes; many older examples include Augis' name. A very common variation on the design presents the line with the words "plus" and "moins" replaced by the mathematical + and − signs, respectively. The mathematical signs are frequently rendered in tiny gemstones, often in contrasting colors.

Among Gérard's other works is the play “A Good Little Devil” (1913), co-written with Maurice Rostand. It was made into a movie of the same name in 1914. Mary Pickford starred in both the play and the movie; she later opined that the movie was one of the worst—if not the worst—she had ever made. Gérard also subtitled a number of films including Alexis Granowsky's Das Lied vom Leben (1931) and Nikolai Ekk's film The Road to Life (1931).

Gérard and Rostand were married on April 8, 1890; they had two sons, Maurice (1891–1968) and Jean Rostand (1894–1977). In later years, Gérard and Maurice Rostand frequented an intellectual circle that included Jean-Paul Sartre and Gilbert Martineau.

It has been said that Gérard "doubtless would have been famous had not her husband's star so far eclipsed her own." After 35 years of widowhood, she died in 1953 and is buried at Cimetiere de Passy, in Paris, as is her son Maurice.

== Works ==
- Les Pipeaux (The Reed Pipes), poems, 1889/90
- Les Vieux, interpreted by Sarah Bernhard in 1903
- Un bon petit Diable (A Good Little Devil), with Maurice Rostand, 1912
- La Marchande d'allumettes (The Candle Seller), with Maurice Rostand (lyrics) and Tiarko Richepin (music), comic opera, 1914
- La Robe d'un soir, 1925
- La Vie amoureuse de Madame de Genlis, 1926
- L'Arc-en-ciel (The Rainbow), poems, 1926
- Mes souvenirs: Cyrano de Bergerac, with a design from Edmond Rostand, 1927
- Le Féminisme (Feminism), with her son Maurice Rostand, conference, 1930
- La Forêt enchantée (The Enchanted Forest), with Maurice Rostand, theater piece, 1931
- Les Papillotes (wrapped candies), one-act in verse, 1931
- Féeries (Fairies), 1933
- Les Masques de l'amour, theater in verse, 1928
- La Tour Saint-Jacques (St. James Tower), theater in verse, 1928
- Les Papillotes, theater in verse, 1928
- À quoi rêvent les vieilles filles (What Do Old Girls Dream Of), theater in verse, 1928
- La Tour Saint-Jacques, one-act in verse, 1934
- Edmond Rostand, 1935
- Rien que des chansons (Nothing But Songs), 1939
- Les Muses françaises (The French Muses), poems, 1943
- Méditations poétiques et harmonies poétiques de Victor Hugo, sonnet, preface by Rosemonde Gérard, 1930
- Histoire d'amour et Lettre de rupture, two songs by Rosemonde Gérard and Tiarko Richepin, registered by Jeanne Aubert in 1942
