= Château de Berthier =

Castle in Haute-Garonne, Occitania, France

Coordinates: 43°30′41″N 1°23′46″E

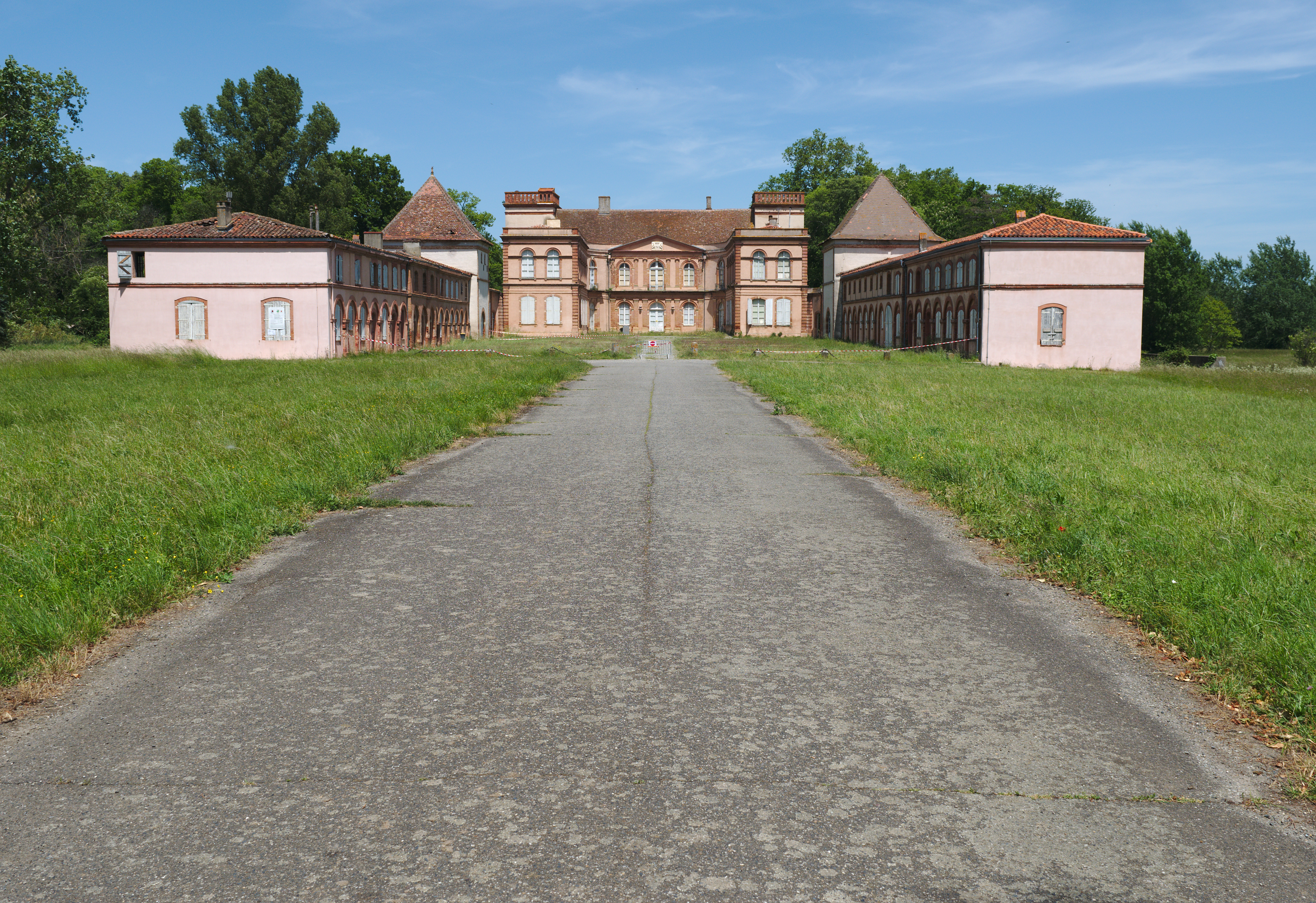
Bertier Castle, view from South-West

The Château de Berthier is a castle in the commune of Pinsaguel in the Haute-Garonne département of France. The castle's origins are in the 13th century, with major building work also in the 14th and 18th centuries.

Privately owned, the castle and its farm have been listed since 1941 as a monument historique by the French Ministry of Culture.

== See also ==
- List of castles in France
