= Esprit Blanche =

French psychiatrist (1796–1852)

Esprit Sylvestre Blanche (15 May 1796, Rouen – 8 November 1852, Paris) was a French psychiatrist.

== Biography ==
His father, Antoine Louis Blanche (1753–1816), was a chief surgeon of the military hospitals of Rouen. After finishing a doctorate of medical studies in 1819 at the Paris School of Medicine, he devoted his life to the study of mental health. He founded a nursing home on the heights of Montmartre, where he took up again principles of a treatment developed by Philippe Pinel, but had his patients keep in touch with a new family instead of isolating them from others. Doctor Blanche counted Nerval and Gounod among his many patients.

In 1826, he moved his Montmartre institution to the Hotel of Lamballe (l’Hôtel de Lamballe) in Passy; the building and its grounds belonged to the Princess of Lamballe.

After his death, his son Antoine Émile Blanche, the father of painter Jacques-Émile Blanche, took over the management of his nursing home, which he kept until 1872. Guy de Maupassant, the French writer, stayed there during the last months of his life (1892–1893), at the clinic of Doctor Blanche.

A member of The Medical Board of Association of Dramatic Artists, he was awarded the Legion of Honor (la Légion d’honneur) in 1834.

He married Marie Madeleine Sophie Bertrand (1800–1876). His daughter, Claire Lydie Blanche, born in 1829 became the wife of architect Léon Ohnet (1813–1874) and the mother of writer Georges Ohnet. He was also the father of Louis Alfred Blanche, born in 1823, an architect in Paris and Antoine Émile Blanche, born in 1820, a psychiatrist.

He was buried in the 2nd section of Passy Cemetery.

== Posterity ==
A street in Paris (la rue du Docteur Blanche) was named after him. Another street with the same name, in Rouen, owes its name to his brother, doctor Antoine Emmanuel Pascal Blanche (1785–1849).

== Books ==
- Du danger des rigueurs corporelles dans le traitement de la folie (On the danger of physical rigors when treating insanity), Paris, Gardembas, 1839
- De l’état actuel de traitement de la folie en France (On the current treatment of insanity in France), Paris, Gardembas, 1840

== See also ==
=== Bibliography ===
- Georges-Paul Collet, Jacques-Émile Blanche. Le peintre écrivain, Bartillat, 2006, 567p
- Théodore-Éloi Lebreton, Biographie rouennaise, Rouen, Le Brument, 1865.
- Laure Murat, La Maison du docteur Blanche, Paris, Jean-Claude Lattès, 2001, 424p.

=== Film ===
A film named La Clinique du Docteur Blanche (The clinic of Doctor Blanche) was directed by Sarah Lévy in 2014.
