= Pinsaguel =

- Commune
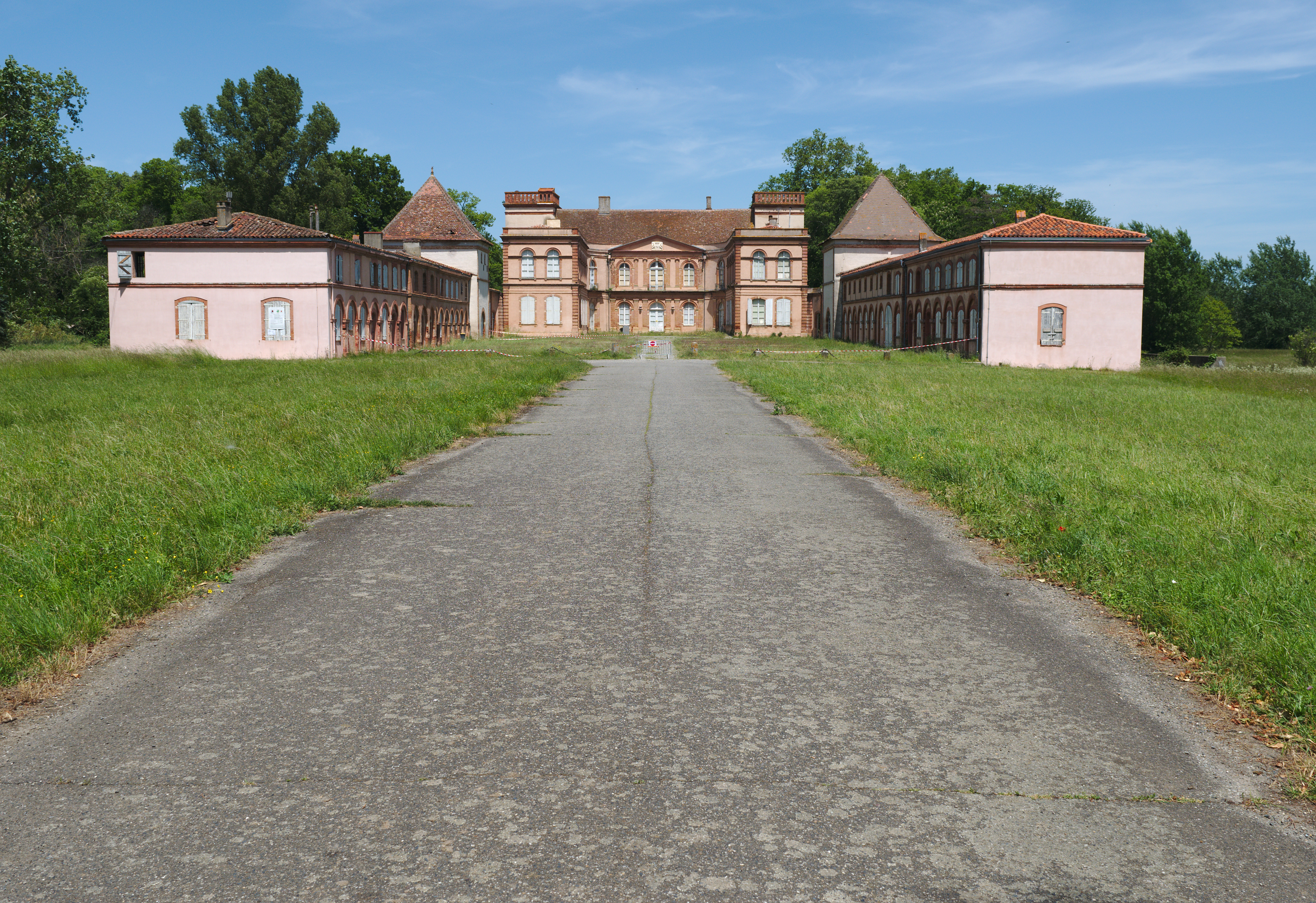
- The chateau Bertier in Pinsaguel

- Coat of arms
- Location of Pinsaguel
- Location within France Location within Occitanie
- Coordinates: 43°30′33″N 1°23′25″E
- Country: France
- Region: Occitania
- Department: Haute-Garonne
- Arrondissement: Muret
- Canton: Portet-sur-Garonne
- Intercommunality: Le Muretain Agglo

Government
  - Mayor (2020–2026): Jean-Louis Coll
- Area^{1}: 5.2 km^{2} (2.0 sq mi)
- Elevation: 151 m (495 ft)
- Highest elevation: 160 m (520 ft)
- Lowest elevation: 144 m (472 ft)
- Population (2023): 2,786
  - Density: 540/km^{2} (1,400/sq mi)
- Time zone: UTC+01:00 (CET)
  - Summer (DST): UTC+02:00 (CEST)
- INSEE/Postal code: 31420 /31120
- ^{1} French Land Register data, which excludes lakes, ponds, glaciers > 1 km^{2} (0.386 sq mi or 247 acres) and river estuaries.

Pinsaguel (French pronunciation: [pɛ̃saɡɛl]; Occitan: Pinsaguèl) is a commune in the Haute-Garonne department in southwestern France.

== Geography ==
The commune was traversed by the rivers of the Garonne and the Ariège.

== Population ==
The inhabitants of the commune are known as Pinsaguelois and Pinsagueloises in French.

Historical population
Year	Pop.	±% p.a.
1968	1,638	—
1975	1,827	+1.57%
1982	1,970	+1.08%
1990	2,603	+3.54%
1999	2,466	−0.60%
2007	2,581	+0.57%
2012	2,682	+0.77%
2017	2,771	+0.66%
2023	2,786	+0.09%
Source: INSEE

== Sights ==
The Château de Pinsaguel is a castle whose origins date back to the 13th century, with major building work also from the 14th and 18th centuries. It is listed as a historic site by the French Ministry of Culture.

== See also ==
- Communes of the Haute-Garonne department
- Louis Castex
