= Dieudonné Costes =

French aviator (1892–1973)

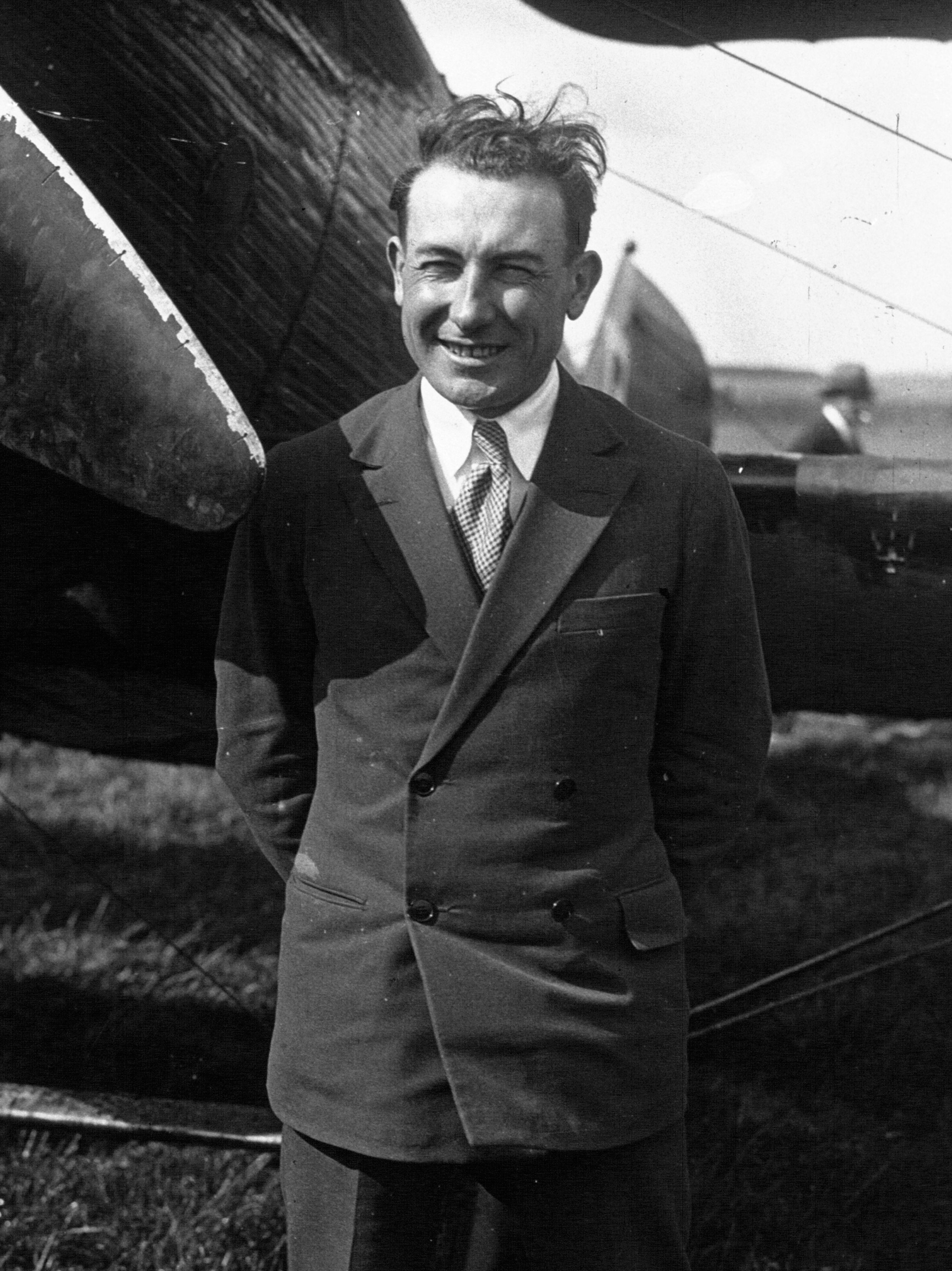
- Born: 14 November 1892
- Died: 18 May 1973 (aged 80)
- Awards: Legion of Honour; Croix de Guerre with seven palms and a gold star; Médaille militaire; Fédération Aéronautique Internationale Gold Medal; Harmon Trophy; Distinguished Flying Cross
- Aviation career
- Air force: French Air Service
- Rank: 2nd Lieutenant

Dieudonné Costes (14 November 1892 – 18 May 1973) was a French fighter ace during World War I, and later distance records-breaking aviator.

== Early life and military service ==
Costes was born in Septfonds, Tarn-et-Garonne. He received a pilot diploma (brevet) on 26 September 1912. During World War I, he served in the French Air Service, in MF55 and MF85 Farman squadrons, then in N506, N507 and N531 fighter Nieuport squadrons, on the Balkan front. He scored 9 victories (6 confirmed) there, the first in April 1917, the rest in January–September 1918. He ended the war as a 2nd Lieutenant. ISBN 978-0-948817-54-0.

After the war, he flew in civil aviation, starting with Latecoere in 1920, on the Toulouse-Casablanca mail route, then flying on the Bordeaux-Paris route in 1921 and on the Paris-London route in Air Union airlines in 1923. From 1925, he became a test pilot in Breguet works. He then started to perform long-distance and record breaking flights with Breguet 19 aircraft.

He was married to the actress Mary Costes (née Princess Vatchnadze).

== Long-distance flights ==
On 26 September 1926, he flew 4,100 km (2,546 miles) from Paris to Assuan, with René de Vitrolles, attempting to break a world distance record. He broke the world distance record on 28 October 1926, flying 5,396 km (3,351 miles) from Paris to Jask, Persia, with J. Rignot, as part of a 19,625-km (12,187-mile) Paris-India-Paris flight.

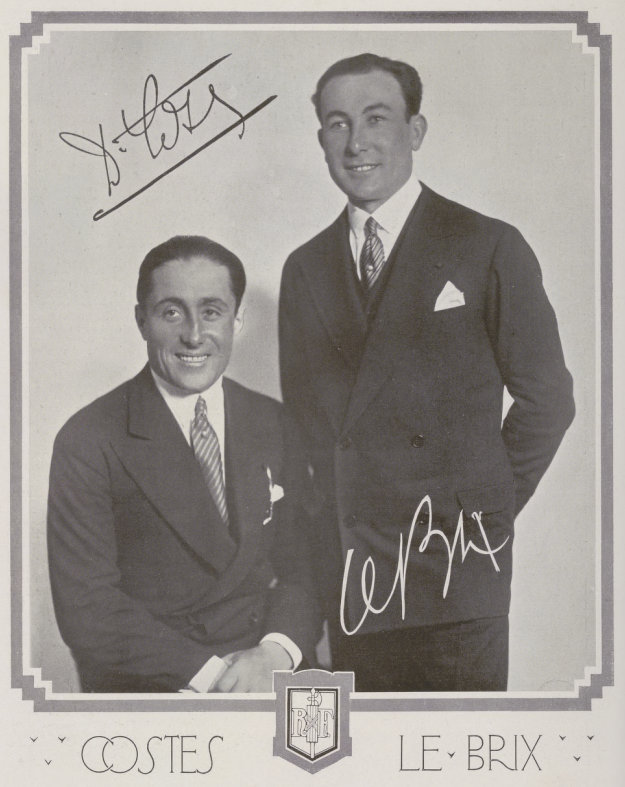
Dieudonné Costes and Joseph Le Brix in Argentine magazine Plus Ultra, November 1927

Between 10 October 1927 and 14 April 1928, Costes and Joseph Le Brix flew 57,410 km (35,652 miles) around the world, in a Breguet 19GR named Nungesser-Coli, from Paris through Argentina, Brazil, the United States, Japan, India, and Greece, although they travelled across the Pacific Ocean from San Francisco, California, to Tokyo, Japan, by ship. During the trip, they made the first non-stop aerial crossing of the South Atlantic Ocean on 14–15 October 1927, flying between Saint-Louis, Senegal, and Natal, Brazil. While in South America, they routed themselves through every country in the continent. On 15–17 December 1928, Costes, with Paul Codos, set a world distance record in a closed circuit of 8,029 km (4,986 miles).

On 13 July 1929, Costes and Maurice Bellonte made an attempt at crossing the North Atlantic Ocean westbound, from Villacoublay near Paris to New York City, flying the Breguet 19 Super Bidon "?" ("Point d'Interrogation" or "Question Mark"). They returned after 17 hours, however, due to bad weather. On 27–29 September 1929, they set the world distance record, flying 7,905 km (4,909 miles) from Paris to Qiqihar, China.

On 1–2 September 1930, Costes with Maurice Bellonte, flew the "Point d'Interrogation" from Paris to New York, as the first heavier-than-air aircraft to reach New York in the more difficult westbound direction between the North American and European mainlands. They covered either 5,850 km (3,633 miles) or 6,200 km (3,850 miles), according to different sources, in 37 hours 18 minutes. While flying over Portsmouth, New Hampshire, they lost their navigational map out of an open window of the plane. Two children saw the map falling from the sky while they were watching for the flight to cross over their farm. The children, Louise Stef and her brother John, returned the map to Costes, who had asked for its return through the media.

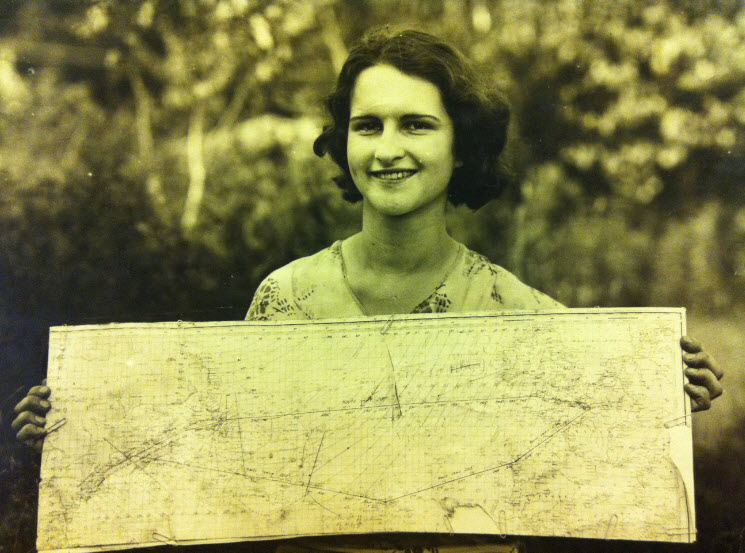
Photo of Louise Stef holding the map that fell from the Point d'Interrogation taken on September 30th, 1930 in Portsmouth, NH on her family's farm.

During World War II, Costes was an instructor in a pilot's school in Versailles, with the rank of lieutenant colonel. He died on 18 May 1973 in Paris and is buried in Passy Cemetery.

== Awards ==
Costes received the Legion of Honour, the Croix de Guerre with seven palms and a gold star, and the Médaille militaire, among other decorations. He also received the 1929 Fédération Aéronautique Internationale Gold Medal and the 1929 Harmon Trophy.

On 2 May 1928, he was awarded the Distinguished Flying Cross by special act of the Congress of the United States in recognition of his historic around the world flight.
