= Maurice Bellonte =

French aviator (1896 - 1983)

Bellonte with Dieudonné Costes in Boston in 1930

Maurice Bellonte (Méru, Oise, 25 October 1896 – Paris, 14 January 1983) was a French aviator who set flight distance records.

Associated with Dieudonné Costes, in 1930 he performed the first westbound crossing of the North Atlantic from Paris to New York, on board the Breguet XIX Point d'interrogation.

== Biography ==
The son of a young lady named Petit and a cutlery worker, Bellonte developed an interest in technology at an early age. In 1910, he began an apprenticeship at Anzani, a small engine manufacturer that had built the engine for the Blériot XI, the first aircraft to cross the English Channel in 1909. In 1913, he was employed as a fitter at Hispano-Suiza. In 1916, at the age of twenty, he graduated as a mechanical engineer. He served in the air force during the First World War. In 1918, he served as a gunner.

After the Armistice, he completed his military service in Morocco, where he learned the basics of flying. Demobilised, he returned to his job at Hispano, then joined the Franco-Colombian company that manufactured hydrofoils. He worked as a mechanic, then as a navigator on the first airlines after the end of the Great War. An interview with Maurice Bellonte by Daniel Costelle in a historical documentary gives an idea of the conditions in which a simple commercial flight from Paris to London was carried out aboard a Farman Goliath in 1923.

In 1923, he met pilot Dieudonné Costes on the Paris-London route. After a failed attempt at a non-stop flight from Paris to New York in 1929, they both broke the distance record with a flight from Paris to Tsitsikhar (Manchuria) covering 7,925 km. This flight proved that the Breguet XIX, powered by a 650 hp Hispano-Suiza engine, could cross the North Atlantic in unfavourable conditions (with headwinds) from east to west. The first Paris-New York flight was finally successful on 1st and 2nd September 1930, after a flight lasting 37 hours and 14 minutes. He was then awarded the gold medal for aeronautics.
