= Haute-Garonne's 7th constituency =

Constituency of the National Assembly of France

7th constituency of Haute-Garonne
- inline Constituency of the National Assembly of France

- Location of constituency in Department

- Location of Haute-Garonne in France
- Deputy: Christophe Bex; LFI
- Department: Haute-Garonne

The 7th constituency of Haute-Garonne is a French legislative constituency in the Haute-Garonne département.

== Geography ==
The borders of the constituency were changed in 2010 and again in 2017. Since 2017 it consists of the Canton of Auterive, (except for the commune of Lafitte-Vigordane) and the communes Lherm, Aignes, Le Fauga, Frouzins, Labastidette, Lavernose-Lacasse, Muret, Saint-Clar-de-Rivière, Saint-Hilaire, Seysses, Venerque, Vernet, Cugnaux and Villeneuve-Tolosane

== Deputies ==
Election	Member	Party
1988	Lionel Jospin	PS
1993	Jean-Pierre Bastiani	UDF
1997	Lionel Jospin	PS
2002	Patrick Lemasle	PS
2007	Patrick Lemasle	PS
2012	Patrick Lemasle	PS
2017	Elisabeth Toutut-Picard	LREM
2022	Christophe Bex	LFI
2024	Christophe Bex	LFI

== Election results ==
=== 2024 ===
Candidate	Party	Alliance	First round			Second round		
Candidate	Party	Alliance	Votes	%	+/–	Votes	%	+/–
Gaëtan Inard	LR-RN	UXD	30,042	40.37	new	34,145	49.22	new
Christophe Bex	LFI	NFP	24,681	33.17	+2.49	35,228	50.78	-0.39
Elisabeth Toutut-Picard	REN	Ensemble	18,462	24.81	-1.72	withdrew		
Hervé Bergnes	LO		1,223	1.64	+0.75			
Votes			74,408	100.00		69,373	100.00	
Valid votes			74,408	96.49	-0.85	69,373	90.52	+0.73
Blank votes			1,914	2.48	+0.51	5,496	7.17	+0.49
Null votes			795	1.03	+0.33	1,766	2.30	-1.23
Turnout			77,117	71.25	+20.46	76,635	70.79	+22.47
Abstentions			31,112	28.75	-20.46	31,620	29.21	-22.47
Registered voters			108,229			108,255		
Result			LFI HOLD					

=== 2022 ===
Legislative Election 2022: Haute-Garonne's 7th constituency
Party	Candidate	Votes	%	±%
LFI (NUPÉS)	Christophe Bex	16,149	30.68	-1.24
LREM (Ensemble)	Élisabeth Toutut-Picard	13,968	26.53	-10.88
RN	Emmanuelle Pinatel	12,531	23.80	+7.12
REC	Georges-Henri Tesseraru	2,459	4.67	N/A
LR	Christophe Bancherit	1,650	3.13	−5.40
DVG	Julien Midali	1,372	2.61	N/A
DVD	Angelique Eymond	1,148	2.18	N/A
Others	N/A	3,365		
Turnout		54,082	50.79	−0.34
2nd round result
LFI (NUPÉS)	Christophe Bex	23,644	51.17	N/A
LREM (Ensemble)	Élisabeth Toutut-Picard	22,559	48.83	−19.01
Turnout		46,203	48.32	+4.24
LFI gain from LREM				

=== 2017 ===
Candidate	Label	First round		Second round	
Candidate	Label	Votes	%	Votes	%
Élisabeth Toutut-Picard	REM	18,664	37.41	26,521	67.84
Marie Dombes	FN	8,320	16.68	12,572	32.16
Christophe Bex	FI	7,525	15.08		
Marie-Caroline Tempesta	PS	4,852	9.73		
Françoise Borret	LR	4,257	8.53		
Catherine Renaux	ECO	2,415	4.84		
Danielle Tensa	PCF	1,131	2.27		
Myriam Crédot	DIV	1,064	2.13		
Damien Jeanne	DLF	819	1.64		
Malena Adrada	EXG	385	0.77		
Roger Strobel	DIV	355	0.71		
Marie-Gabrielle de La Dorie	DVD	100	0.20		
Pierre Moure	ECO	3	0.01		
Votes		49,890	100.00	39,093	100.00
Valid votes		49,890	97.78	39,093	87.88
Blank votes		793	1.55	3,851	8.66
Null votes		340	0.67	1,542	3.47
Turnout		51,023	51.13	44,486	44.59
Abstentions		48,761	48.87	55,281	55.41
Registered voters		99,784		99,767	
Source: Ministry of the Interior

=== 2012 ===
2012 legislative election in Haute-Garonne's 7th constituency
Candidate	Party	First round		Second round	
Candidate	Party	Votes	%	Votes	%
Patrick Lemasle	PS	25,116	45.13%	32,328	63.62%
Corinne Viansson-Ponte	UMP	11,866	21.32%	18,485	36.38%
Serge Laroze	FN	9,825	17.65%		
Danielle Tensa	FG	4,333	7.79%		
Christian Valade	EELV	2,688	4.83%		
Roger Strobel	AEI	597	1.07%		
Cyril Walter	MPF	473	0.85%		
Anne-Marie Laflorentie	LO	396	0.71%		
Noëlle Calvinhac	NPA	364	0.65%		
Valid votes		55,658	98.38%	50,813	96.20%
Spoilt and null votes		919	1.62%	2,006	3.80%
Votes cast / turnout		56,577	61.15%	52,819	57.10%
Abstentions		35,942	38.85%	39,690	42.90%
Registered voters		92,519	100.00%	92,509	100.00%

=== 2007 ===
Legislative Election 2007: Haute-Garonne's 7th constituency
Party	Candidate	Votes	%	±%
PS	Patrick Lemasle	28,379	36.21	
UMP	Jean-Pierre Bastiani	26,916	34.34	
MoDem	Eric Gautier	6,219	7.93	
FN	Armand Delamare	2,832	3.61	
LV	Françoise Emery	2,536	3.24	
Far left	Jean-Michel Audoin	2,481	3.17	
PCF	Marc Arellano	2,409	3.07	
Others	N/A	6,605		
Turnout		80,155	66.05	
2nd round result
PS	Patrick Lemasle	44,891	57.26	
UMP	Jean-Pierre Bastiani	33,501	42.74	
Turnout		80,840	66.61	
PS hold				

=== 2002 ===
Legislative Election 2002: Haute-Garonne's 7th constituency
Party	Candidate	Votes	%	±%
PS	Patrick Lemasle	29,018	38.31	
UMP	Jean-Pierre Bastiani	23,954	31.62	
FN	Françoise Moreau	7,990	10.55	
LV	Françoise Emery	2,815	3.72	
PCF	Nadine Stoll	2,255	2.98	
LCR	Jean-Michel Audoin	2,234	2.95	
CPNT	Jean-Louis Goxes	1,684	2.22	
Others	N/A	5,804		
Turnout		77,835	72.06	
2nd round result
PS	Patrick Lemasle	39,110	56.19	
UMP	Jean-Pierre Bastiani	30,497	43.81	
Turnout		72,833	67.43	
PS hold				

=== 1997 ===
Legislative Election 1997: Haute-Garonne's 7th constituency
Party	Candidate	Votes	%	±%
PS	Lionel Jospin	30,868	43.71	
UDF	Marie-Denise Xerri	11,152	15.79	
DVD	Alain Chatillon	7,771	11.00	
FN	Théo Buras	7,374	10.44	
PCF	Michel Veyssière	4,897	6.93	
LO	Anne-Marie Laflorentie	1,715	2.43	
Others	N/A	6,840		
Turnout		73,956	77.35	
2nd round result
PS	Lionel Jospin	45,024	63.38	
UDF	Marie-Denise Xerri	26,017	36.62	
Turnout		75,638	79.11	
PS gain from UDF				
