= Jean-Pierre Bastiani =

French politician (1950–2021)

Mayor of Auterive
- In office 4 April 2014 – 3 February 2018
- Preceded by: Christophe Lefèvbre
- Succeeded by: René Azéma
- In office March 1989 – 2008
- Preceded by: André Sagné
- Succeeded by: Christophe Lefèvbre

Member of the French National Assembly
- In office 2 April 1993 – 21 April 1997
- Preceded by: Lionel Jospin
- Succeeded by: Lionel Jospin
- Constituency: Haute-Garonne's 7th constituency

General Councilor of the Canton of Auterive
- In office 1994–2008

Personal details
- Born: 6 June 1950 Toulouse, France
- Died: 27 August 2021 (aged 71)
- Party: UDF; UMP; UDI

Jean-Pierre Bastiani (6 June 1950 – 27 August 2021) was a French politician.

== Biography ==
Bastiani was general councilor of the canton of Auterive from 1994 to 2008 and mayor of Auterive from 1989 to 2008 and again from 2014 to 2018. He was also elected to the National Assembly for Haute-Garonne's 7th constituency in 1993, earning 37.48% of the vote in the first round and 52.16% in the second, defeating minister of education Lionel Jospin. He did not run for re-election in 1997. He ran again in 2002 but was defeated by Patrick Lemasle.

Bastiani died on 27 August 2021 at the age of 71.
