= Patrick Lemasle =

French politician (1952–2026)

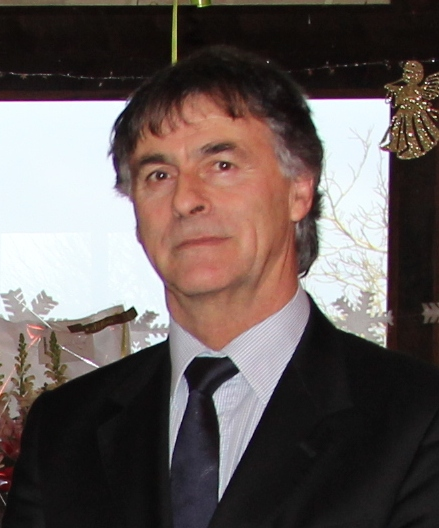
- Lemasle in 2013
- Parliamentary group: Socialiste, radical, citoyen et divers gauche

Deputy for Haute-Garonne's 7th constituency in the National Assembly of France
- In office 2002–2017
- Preceded by: Lionel Jospin
- Succeeded by: Élisabeth Toutut-Picard

Personal details
- Born: 18 May 1952 Saint-Hilaire-du-Harcouët, France
- Died: 12 March 2026 (aged 73)

Patrick Lemasle (18 May 1952 – 12 March 2026) was a French politician who was a member of the National Assembly of France from 2002 to 2017. He represented the 7th constituency of the Haute-Garonne department, as a member of the Socialiste, radical, citoyen et divers gauche. Lemasle was a member of the Finance Committee. He died on 12 March 2026, at the age of 73.
