= Canton of Tournefeuille =

Coordinates: 43.58°N 1.34°E

The canton of Tournefeuille is an administrative division of the Haute-Garonne department, southern France. Its borders were not modified at the French canton reorganisation which came into effect in March 2015. Its seat is in Tournefeuille.

It consists of the following communes:

1. Cugnaux
2. Tournefeuille
3. Villeneuve-Tolosane
