= Château de Gramart =

Town hall in Tournefeuille, France

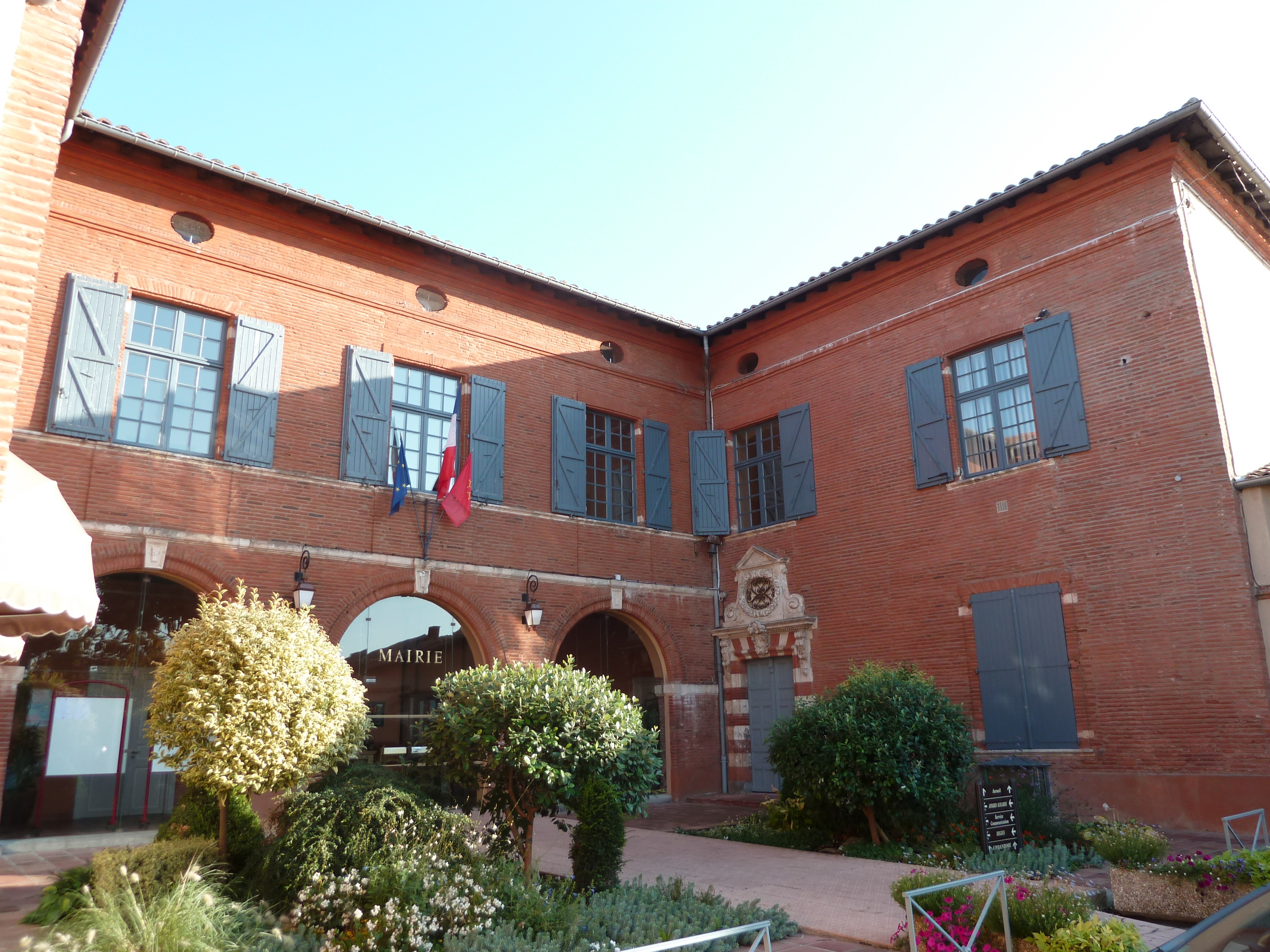
- The main frontage of the Château de Fromont in September 2011

General information
- Type: City hall
- Architectural style: Neoclassical style
- Location: Tournefeuille, France
- Coordinates: 43.5828°N 1.3467°E
- Completed: c.1630

Monument historique
- Official name: Mairie (ancien château de Gramart)
- Type: Inscrit
- Designated: 1950
- Reference no.: PA00094646

The Château de Gramart (French pronunciation: [otɛl də vil] is a municipal building in Tournefeuille, Haute-Garonne, in southwestern France, standing on Place de la Mairie. It was designated a monument historique by the French government in 1950.

== History ==
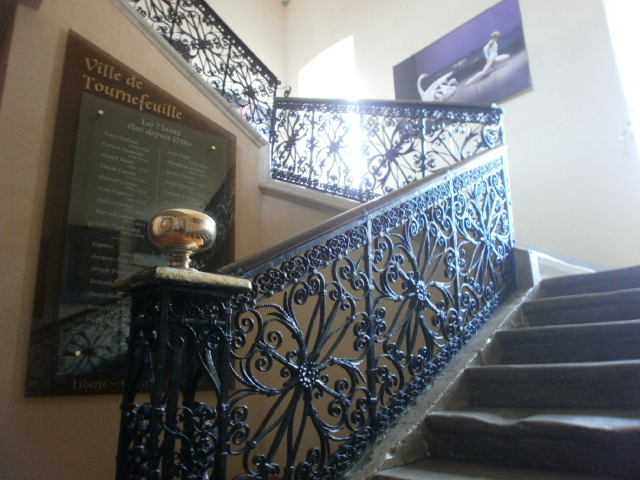
The grand staircase

The area which now forms the town square was the property of the treasurer-general of the province of Languedoc, Louis Minard, in the late 15th century. The first château on the site was erected at that time. It was crenelated and equipped with gun ports, but was attacked and badly damaged by the Huguenots in 1595 during the French Wars of Religion.

The current building was commissioned by the local seigneur and president of the Parlement of Toulouse, Jean Georges de Caulet, during the reign of King Louis XIII in around 1630. Jean Georges de Caulet was a maréchal de camp in the French Army and was created Marquis de Grammont by Louis XIV in the mid-17th century.

The design involved a symmetrical main frontage of three bays, with wings which were projected forward on either side, facing down the main street (now Rue Gaston Doumergue). The main block featured three round headed openings with voussoirs and keystones on the ground floor, three casement windows with shutters on the first floor and three oculi at attic level. The southern wing contained an ornate doorway leading to a grand staircase with a Spanish-influenced iron railing.

In 1788, Tristan de Caulet, Marquis de Grammont, sold the building and estate to Pierre de Joly, who was an advisor to King Louis XVI. After the French Revolution, the building was acquired by the town council and was converted for use as the town hall. One of the rooms was converted for use as the Salle du Conseil (council chamber).

A war memorial, in the form of a soldier sitting on a pedestal, which was intended to commemorate the lives of local service personnel who had died in the First World War, was unveiled in front of the town hall in November 1922. In 2013, the landscaping in front of the building was improved with a row of fountains and new floodlighting and, since September 2020, the council has encouraged exhibitions of modern art in the building.
