= Christophe Bex =

French politician (born 1961)

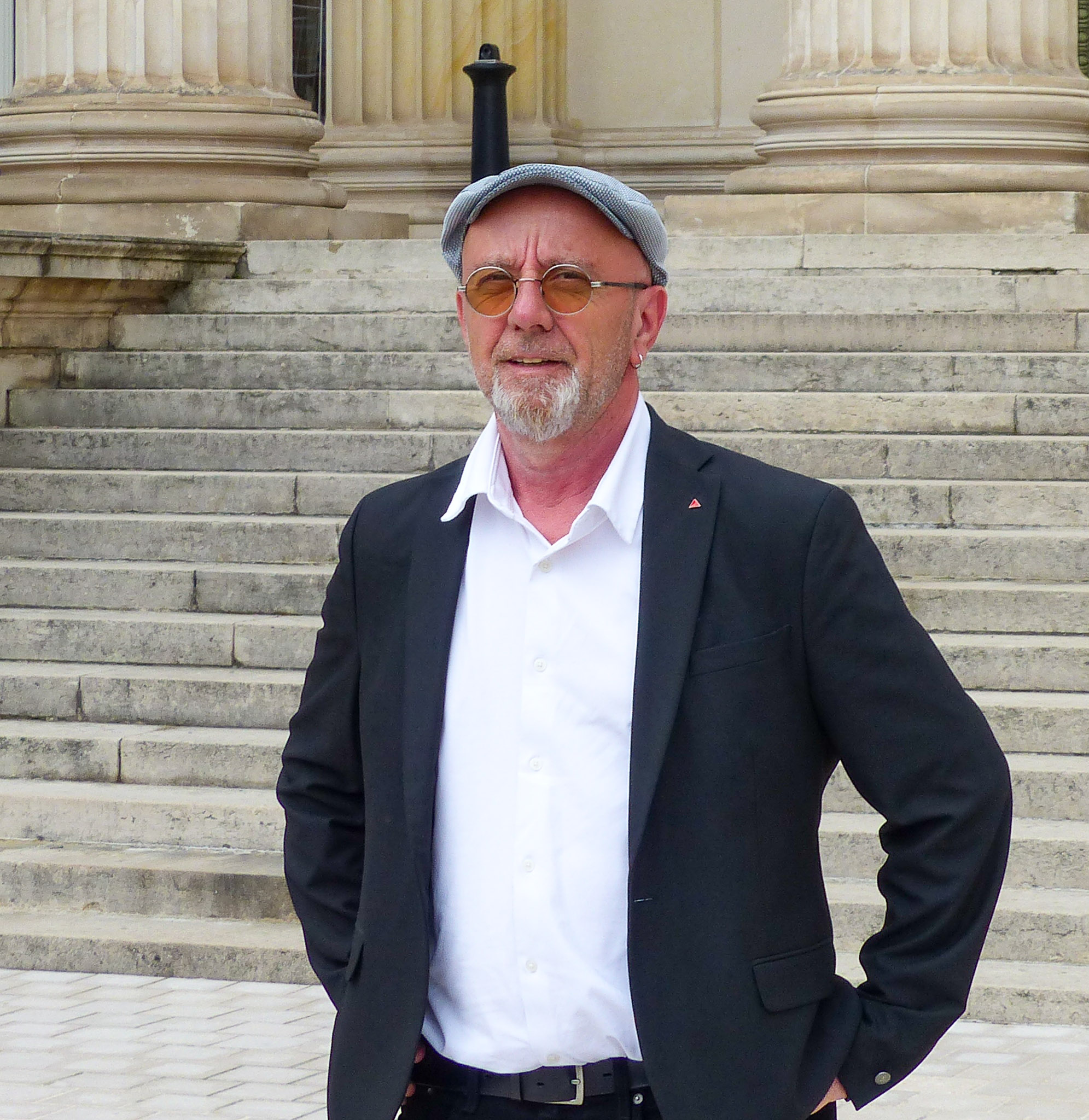

Member of the National Assembly for Haute-Garonne's 7th constituency
- Incumbent
- Assumed office 21 June 2022
- Preceded by: Élisabeth Toutut-Picard

Personal details
- Born: 14 November 1961 (age 64) Neufchâteau, Vosges, France
- Party: La France Insoumise
- Other political affiliations: NUPES

Christophe Bex (born 14 November 1961) is a French politician from La France Insoumise (NUPES). He has been member of the National Assembly for Haute-Garonne's 7th constituency since 2022.

== See also ==
- List of deputies of the 16th National Assembly of France
