= Tournefeuille =

- Commune
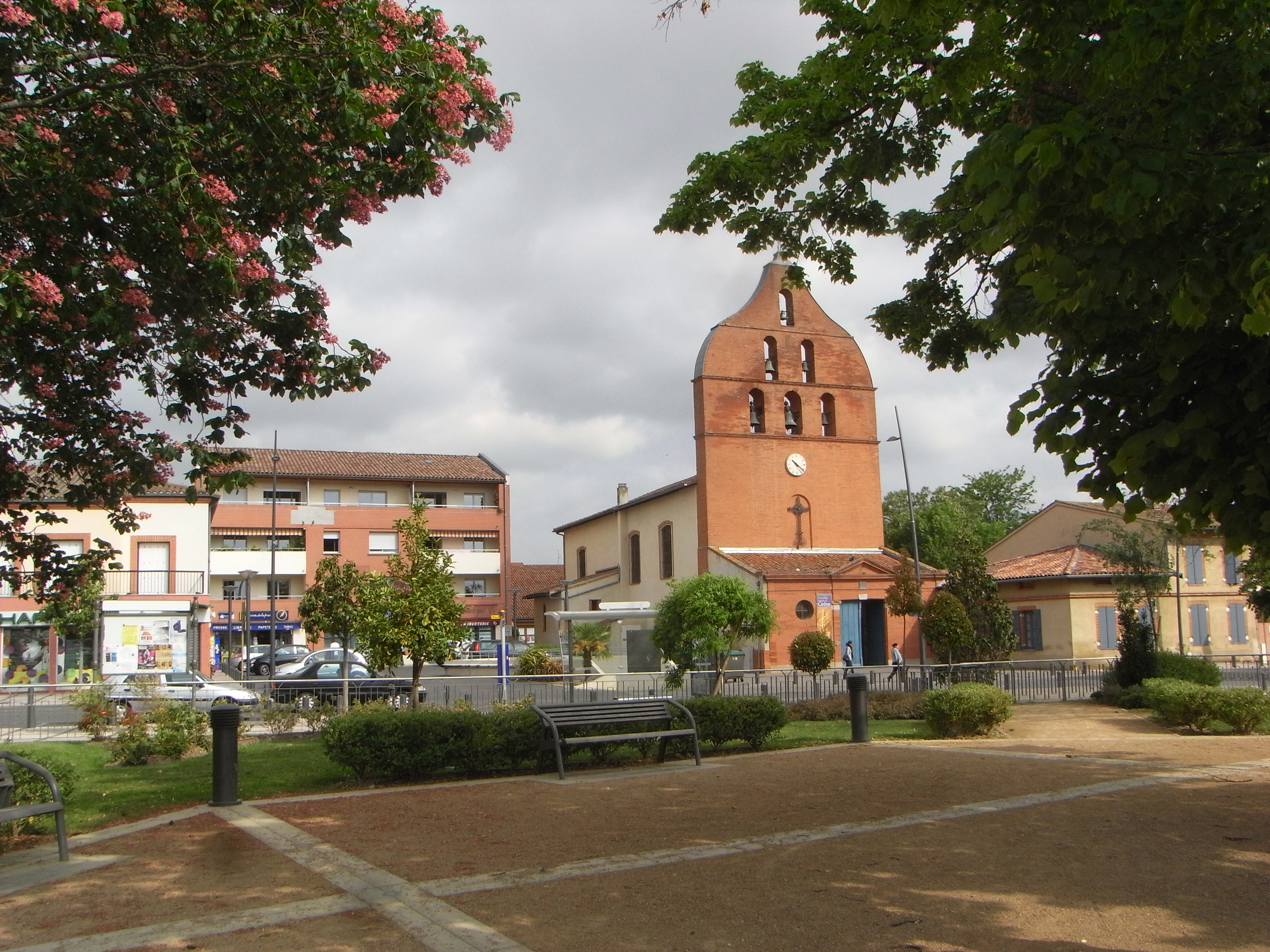
- The church in Tournefeuille

- Coat of arms
- Location of Tournefeuille
- Location within France Location within Occitanie
- Coordinates: 43°35′07″N 1°20′39″E
- Country: France
- Region: Occitania
- Department: Haute-Garonne
- Arrondissement: Toulouse
- Canton: Tournefeuille
- Intercommunality: Toulouse Métropole

Government
  - Mayor (2024–2026): Frédéric Parre
- Area^{1}: 18.17 km^{2} (7.02 sq mi)
- Elevation: 140 m (460 ft)
- Highest elevation: 190 m (620 ft)
- Lowest elevation: 146 m (479 ft)
- Population (2023): 30,168
  - Density: 1,660/km^{2} (4,300/sq mi)
- Time zone: UTC+01:00 (CET)
  - Summer (DST): UTC+02:00 (CEST)
- INSEE/Postal code: 31557 /31170
- ^{1} French Land Register data, which excludes lakes, ponds, glaciers > 1 km^{2} (0.386 sq mi or 247 acres) and river estuaries.

Tournefeuille (French pronunciation: [tuʁnəfœj]; Languedocien: Tornafuèlha) is a commune in the Haute-Garonne department in southwestern France.

It is the second-largest suburb of the city of Toulouse, and is adjacent to it on the west side. It is a member of the Toulouse Métropole.

== History ==
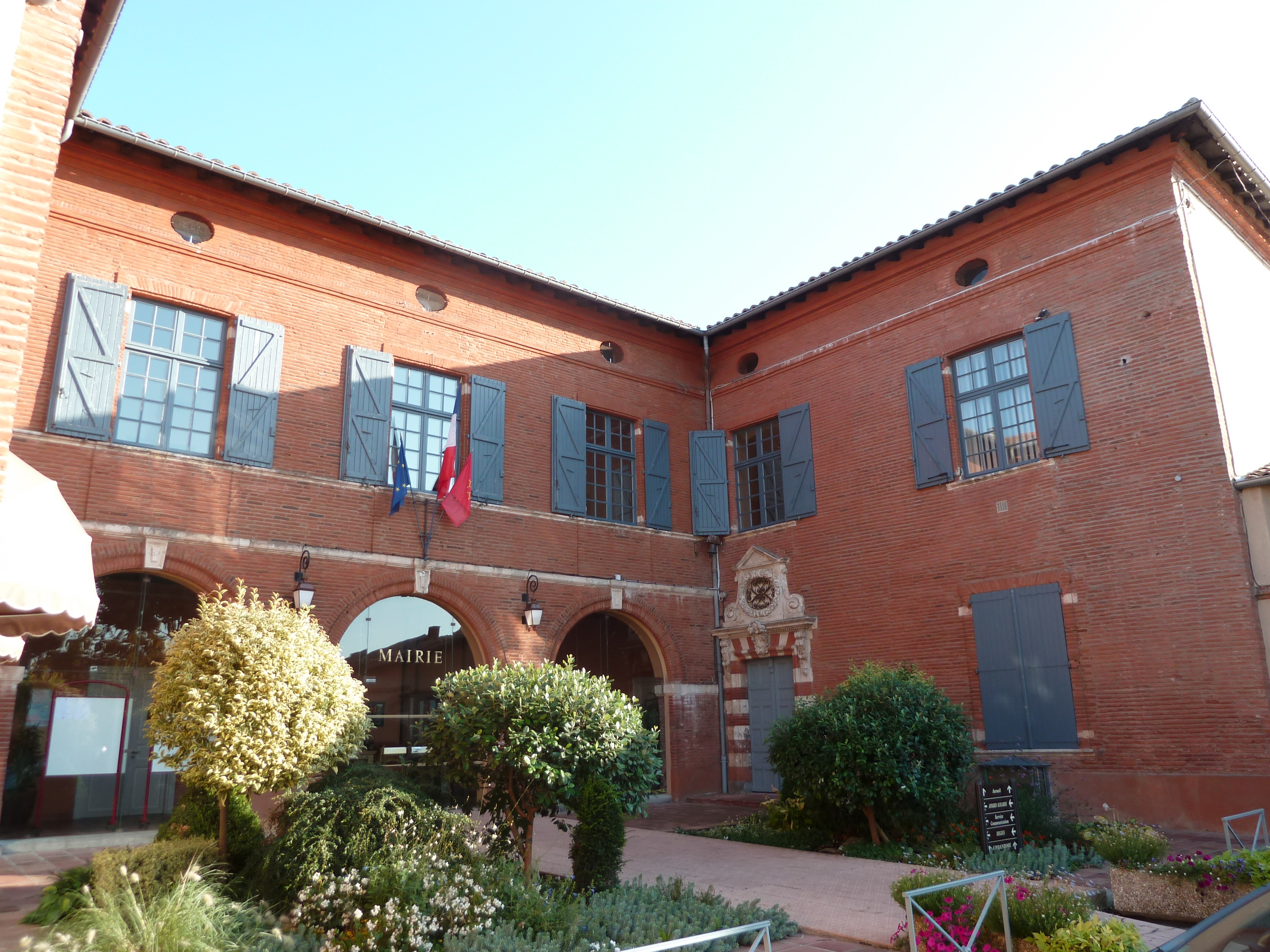
The Hôtel de Ville

The Hôtel de Ville was built as a private residence and dates back to the reign of Louis XIII i.e. around 1630.

== Toponymy ==
Tournefeuille, on the left bank of the Garonne, is located in the linguistic area of Gascon Occitan of the eastern variant, of essentially oral expression linked to a rurality dependent on the domination of Toulouse of Languedocian culture.

The French toponym Tournefeuille is put in Occitan in graphic correspondence with: Torna Fuèlha in Languedoc, Torna Huelha in local Gascon, without semantic relevance. Tournefeuille would be rendered by Vira Fuèlha in Occitan.

Torna Auelha /Oelha ['turnɔ (a)'weʎɔ] means "bring back sheep".

The verbs tornar and virar, related to tourner and virer, do not have the same meanings in Occitan. tornar means to return, to turn over, to bring back, and tourner is virar.

As for the second element, it would be a phonetic confusion between the Gascon words huelha "leaf" and auelha/oelha "sheep", homophones in case of elision of the initial "H" of the connected determiner.

== Geography ==
The Touch flows northeast through the commune and crosses the town.

== Population ==
Historical population

Year	Pop.	±% p.a.
1793	535	—
1800	522	−0.35%
1806	530	+0.25%
1821	706	+1.93%
1831	737	+0.43%
1836	725	−0.33%
1841	737	+0.33%
1846	764	+0.72%
1851	769	+0.13%
1856	682	−2.37%
1861	720	+1.09%
1866	735	+0.41%
1872	702	−0.76%
1876	799	+3.29%
1881	761	−0.97%
1886	791	+0.78%
1891	775	−0.41%
1896	771	−0.10%
1901	808	+0.94%

Year	Pop.	±% p.a.
1906	824	+0.39%
1911	785	−0.97%
1921	829	+0.55%
1926	864	+0.83%
1931	972	+2.38%
1936	999	+0.55%
1946	1,295	+2.63%
1954	1,577	+2.49%
1962	2,209	+4.30%
1968	3,438	+7.65%
1975	5,291	+6.35%
1982	8,541	+7.08%
1990	16,669	+8.72%
1999	22,758	+3.52%
2007	25,709	+1.54%
2012	26,342	+0.49%
2017	26,962	+0.47%
2023	30,168	+1.89%

Source: EHESS and INSEE (1968-2023)

The inhabitants of the commune are known as Tournefeuillais and Tournefeuillaises in French.

== Twin towns ==
Tournefeuille is currently twinned with Graus in Spain.

== Sport ==
Tournefeuille's football club is famous for being Manchester City's Gaël Clichy's youth team.

== See also ==
- Communes of the Haute-Garonne department
