= Élisabeth Toutut-Picard =

French politician (born 1954)

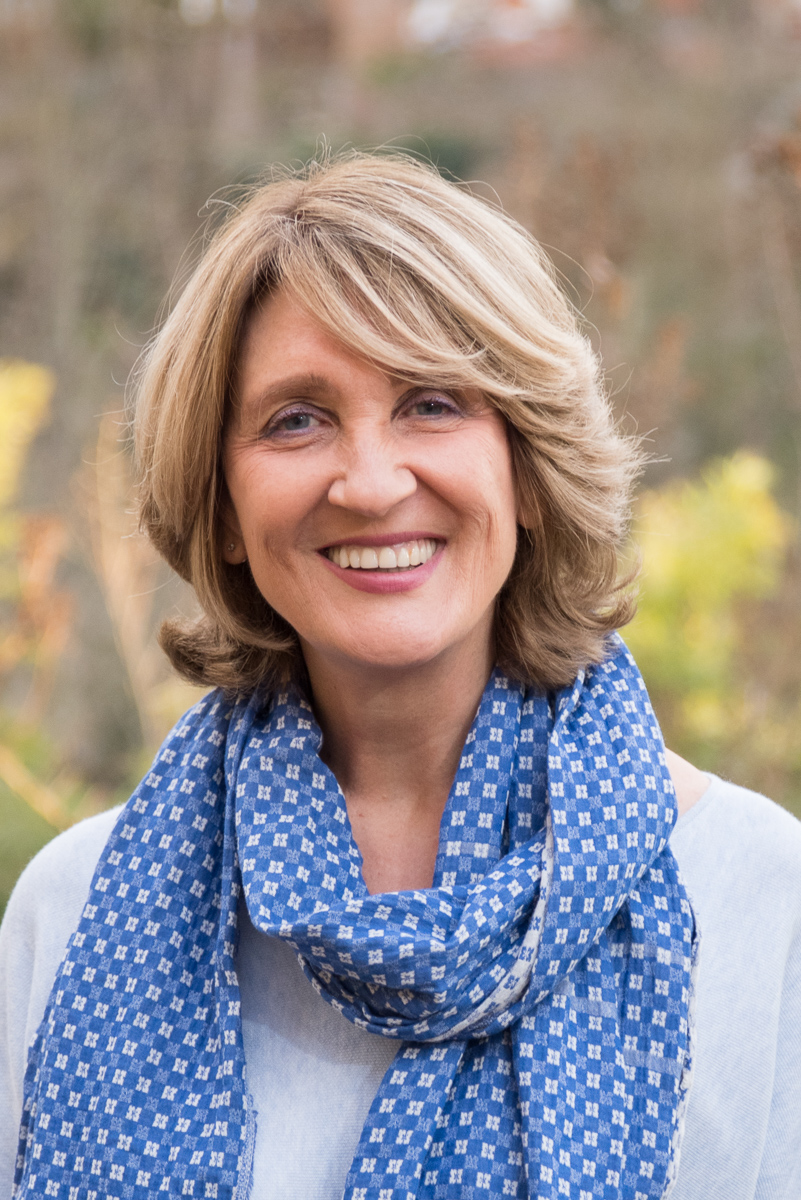
Elisabeth Toutut-Picard

Élisabeth Toutut-Picard (French pronunciation: [elizabɛt tuty pikaʁ]; born 17 December 1954) is a French politician of La République En Marche! (LREM) who was elected as a member of the French National Assembly in the 2017 elections, representing the 7th constituency of the Haute-Garonne department. She served until 2022. Picard contracted COVID-19 on 7 March 2020 during the COVID-19 pandemic.

== Political career ==
In parliament, Toutut-Picard served as member of the Committee on Sustainable Development and Spatial Planning. In addition to the committee assignment, she was part of the parliamentary friendship group with Algeria and New Zealand. In 2020, Toutut-Picard joined En commun (EC), a group within LREM led by Barbara Pompili.

In 2022, Toutut-Picard was narrowly defeated in the second round National Assembly elections by Christophe Bex of LFI.

== Political positions ==
In July 2019, Toutut-Picard decided not to align with her parliamentary group's majority and became one of 52 LREM members who abstained from a vote on the French ratification of the European Union’s Comprehensive Economic and Trade Agreement (CETA) with Canada.

== See also ==
- 2017 French legislative election
- 2022 French legislative election
