= Villeneuve-Tolosane =

- Commune
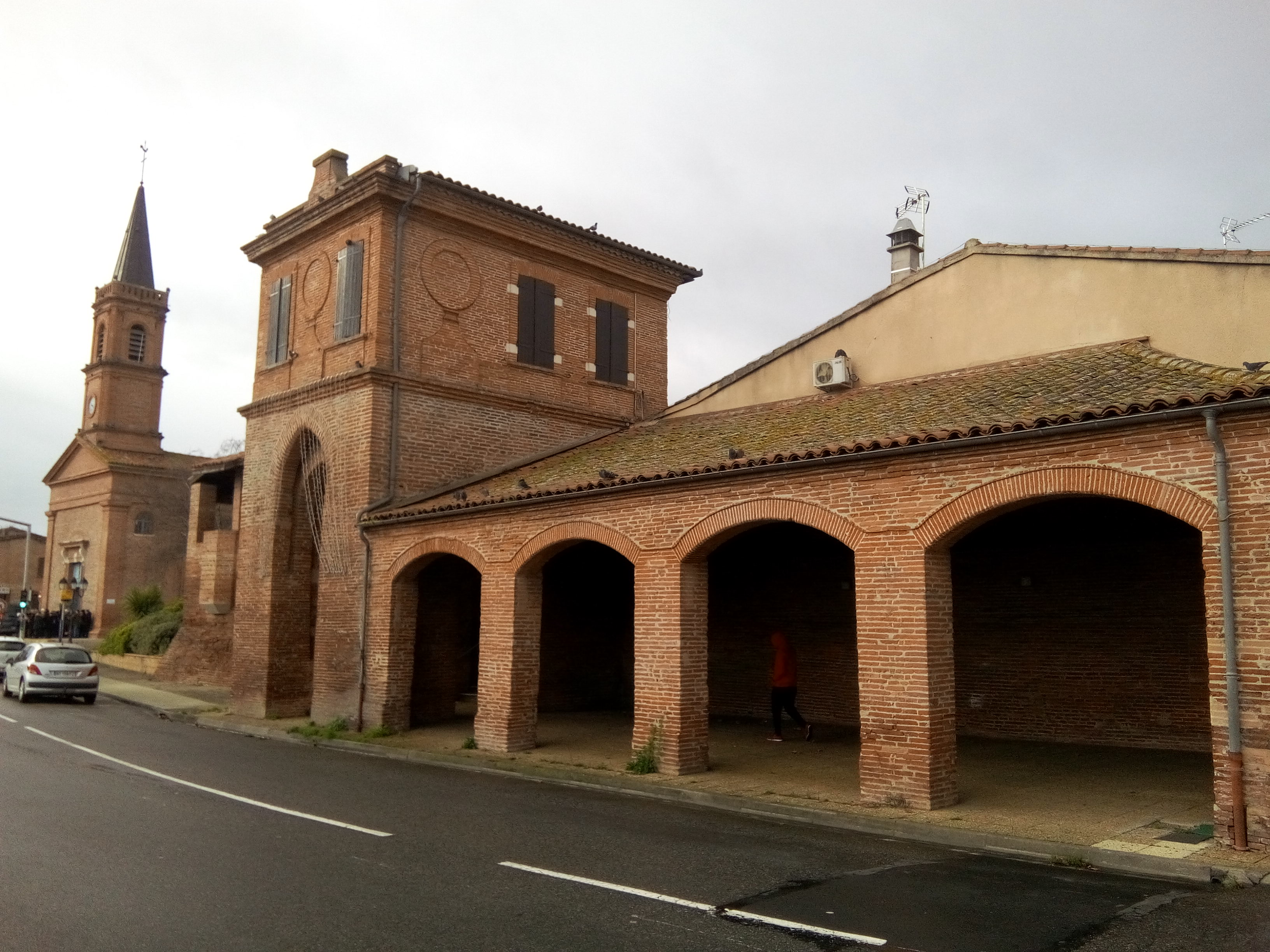
- The church in Villeneuve-Tolosane

- Coat of arms
- Location of Villeneuve-Tolosane
- Location within France Location within Occitanie
- Coordinates: 43°31′29″N 1°20′33″E
- Country: France
- Region: Occitania
- Department: Haute-Garonne
- Arrondissement: Toulouse
- Canton: Tournefeuille
- Intercommunality: Toulouse Métropole

Government
  - Mayor (2020–2026): Romain Vaillant
- Area^{1}: 5.08 km^{2} (1.96 sq mi)
- Elevation: 135 m (443 ft)
- Highest elevation: 173 m (568 ft)
- Lowest elevation: 153 m (502 ft)
- Population (2023): 11,044
  - Density: 2,170/km^{2} (5,630/sq mi)
- Time zone: UTC+01:00 (CET)
  - Summer (DST): UTC+02:00 (CEST)
- INSEE/Postal code: 31588 /31270
- ^{1} French Land Register data, which excludes lakes, ponds, glaciers > 1 km^{2} (0.386 sq mi or 247 acres) and river estuaries.

Villeneuve-Tolosane (French pronunciation: [vilnœv tɔlozan]; Occitan: Vilanava Tolosana) is a commune in the Haute-Garonne department in southwestern France.

== Population ==
The inhabitants of the commune are known as Villeneuvois and Villeneuvoises in French.

Historical population
Year	Pop.	±% p.a.
1968	2,486	—
1975	5,159	+10.99%
1982	6,438	+3.21%
1990	7,559	+2.03%
1999	8,252	+0.98%
2007	8,259	+0.01%
2012	8,854	+1.40%
2017	9,720	+1.88%
2023	11,044	+2.15%
Source: INSEE

== Gallery (church and around) ==
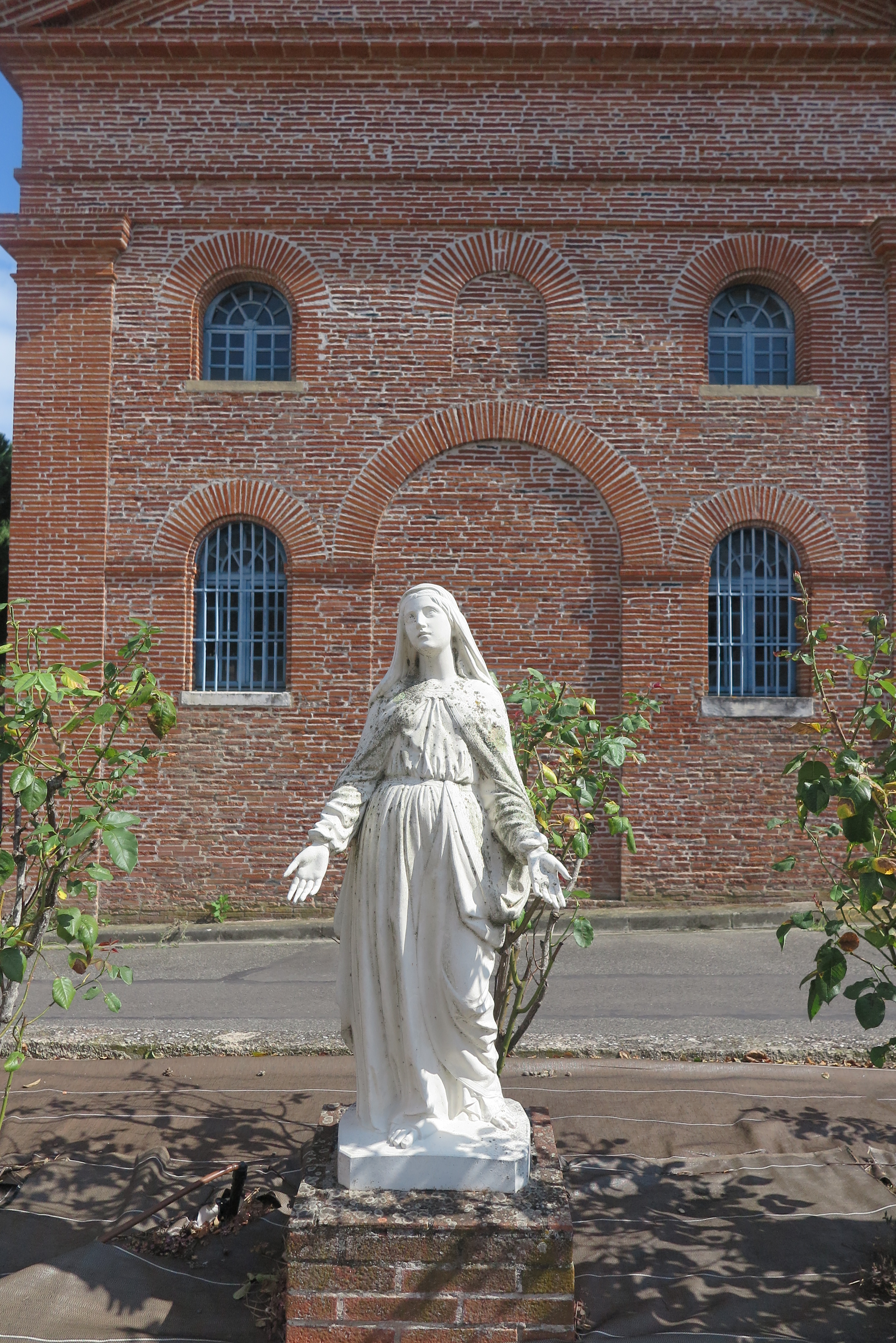

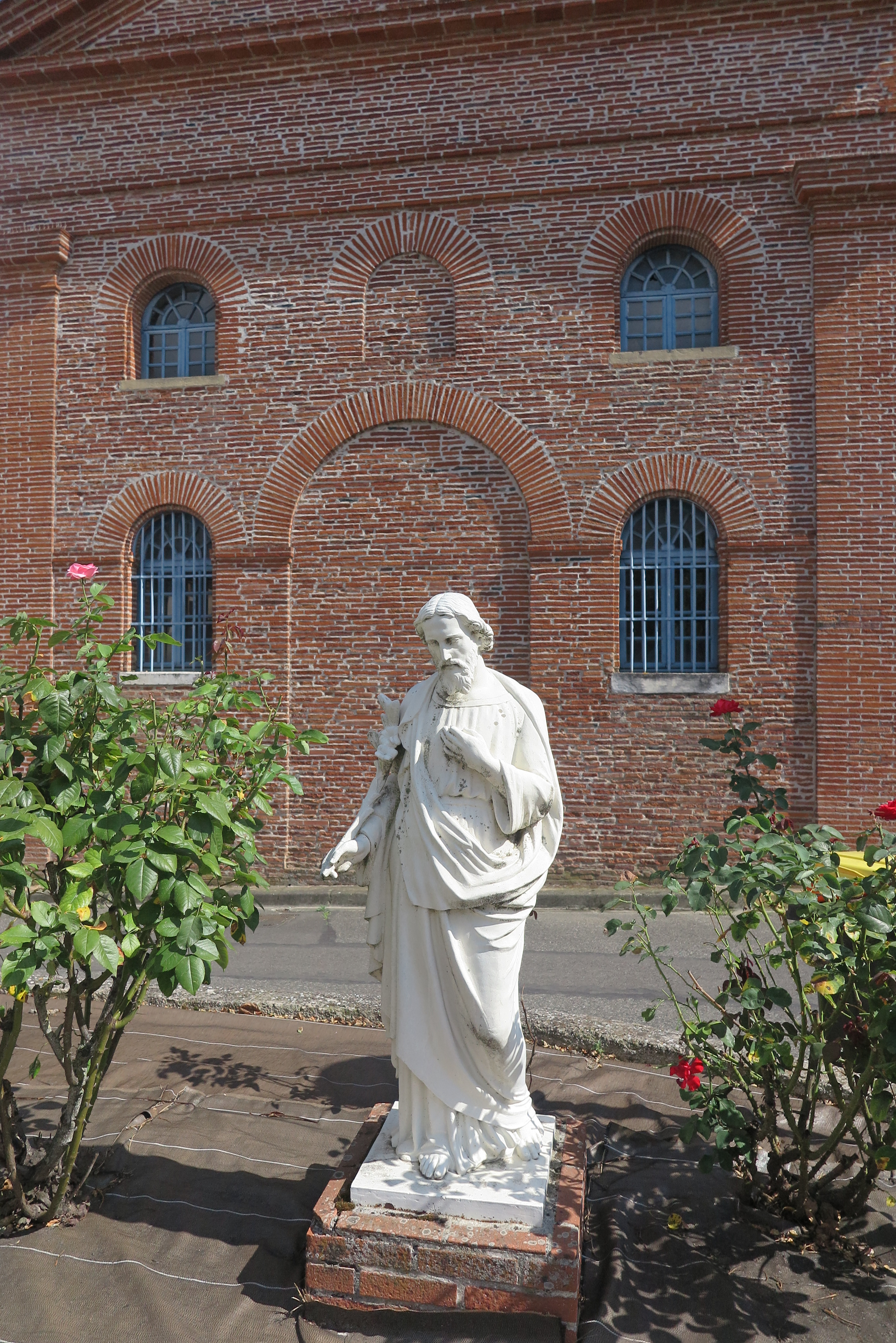

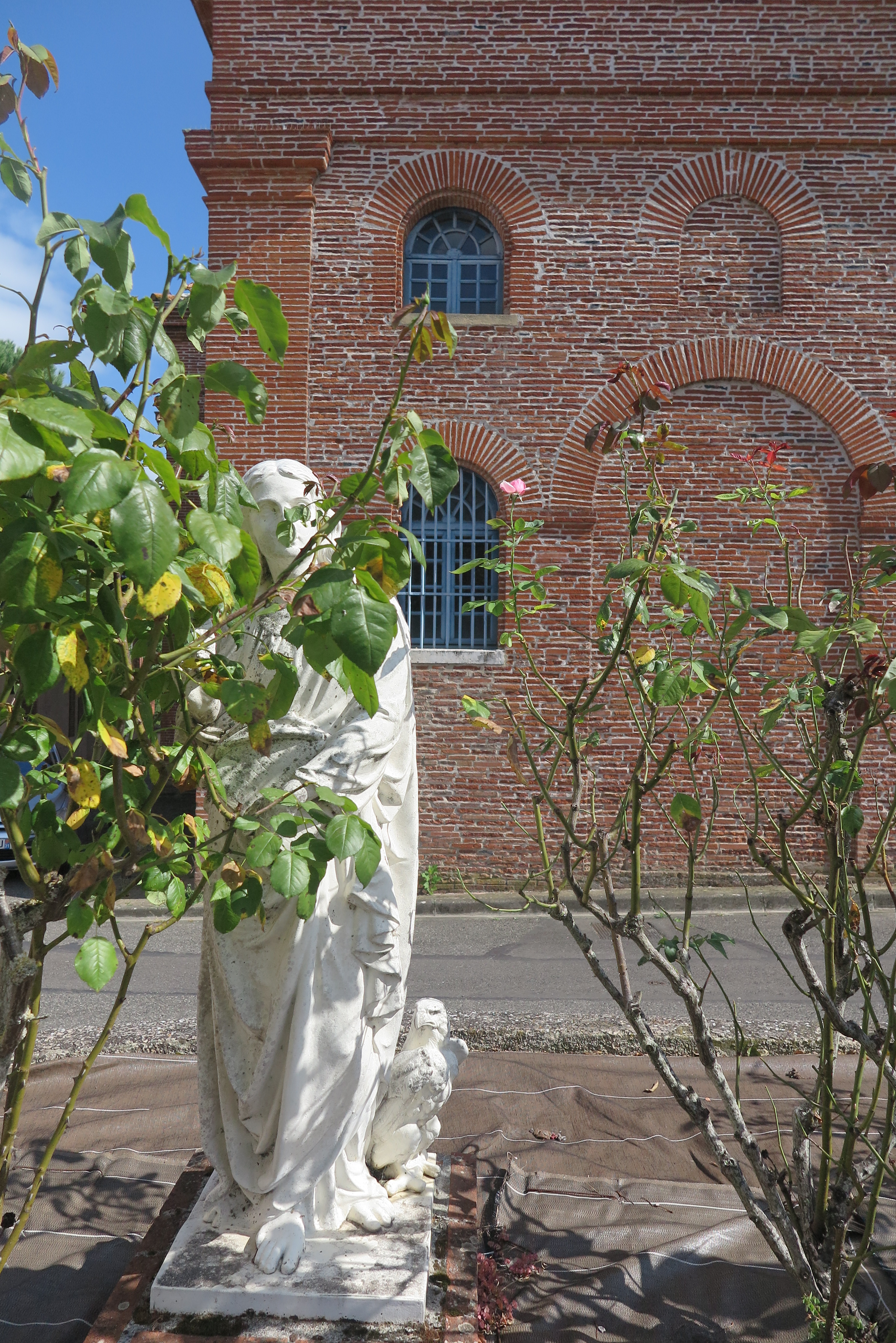

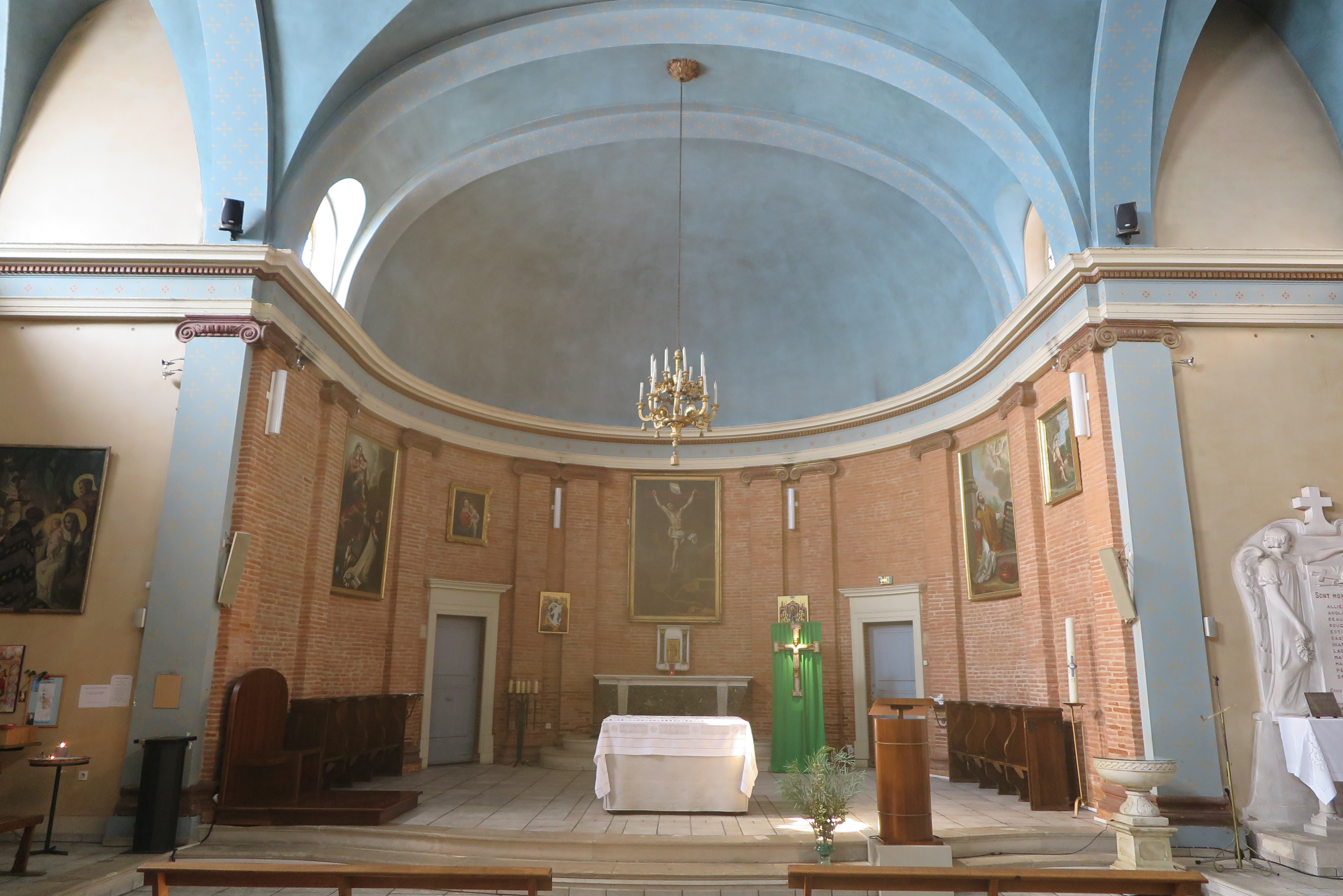

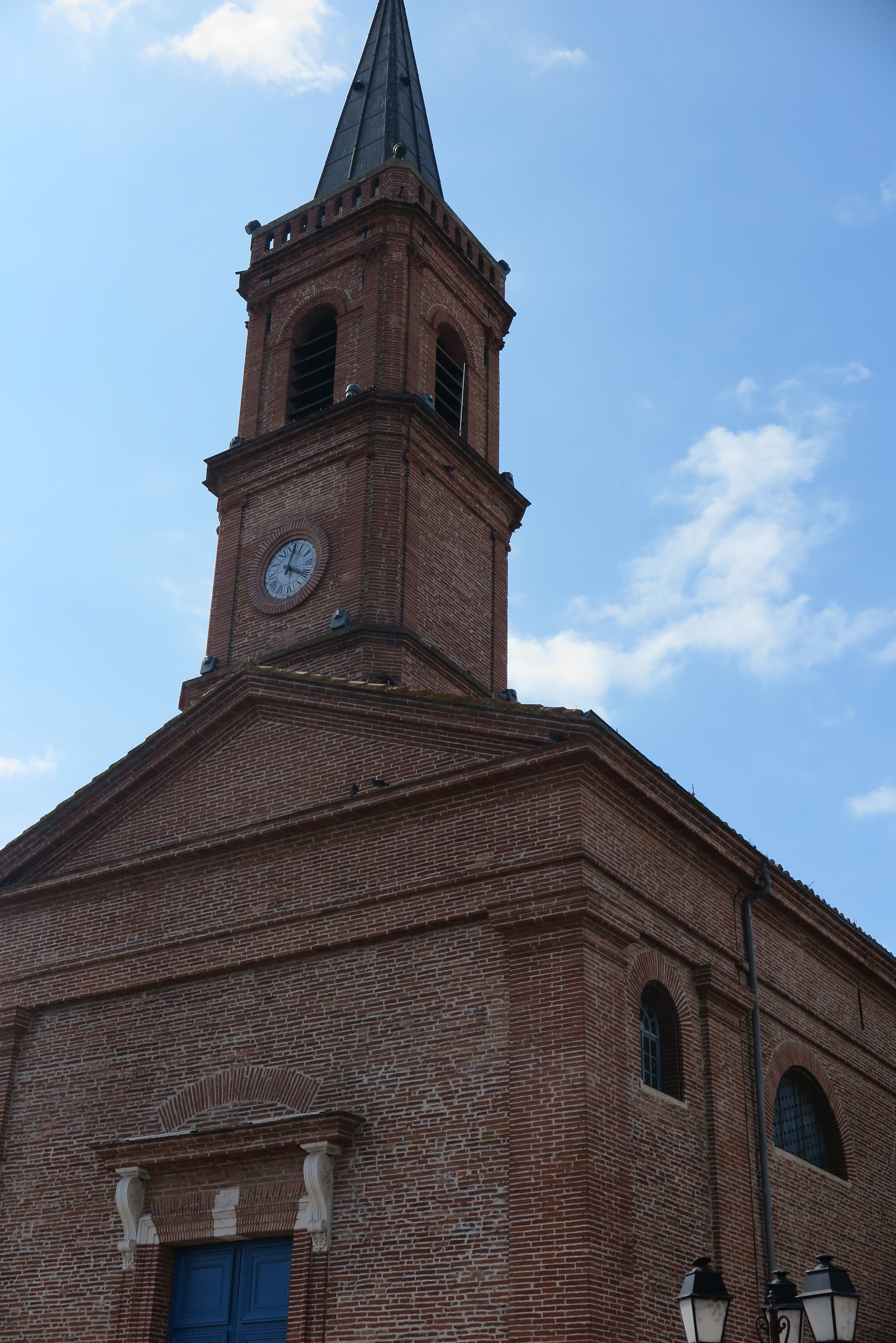

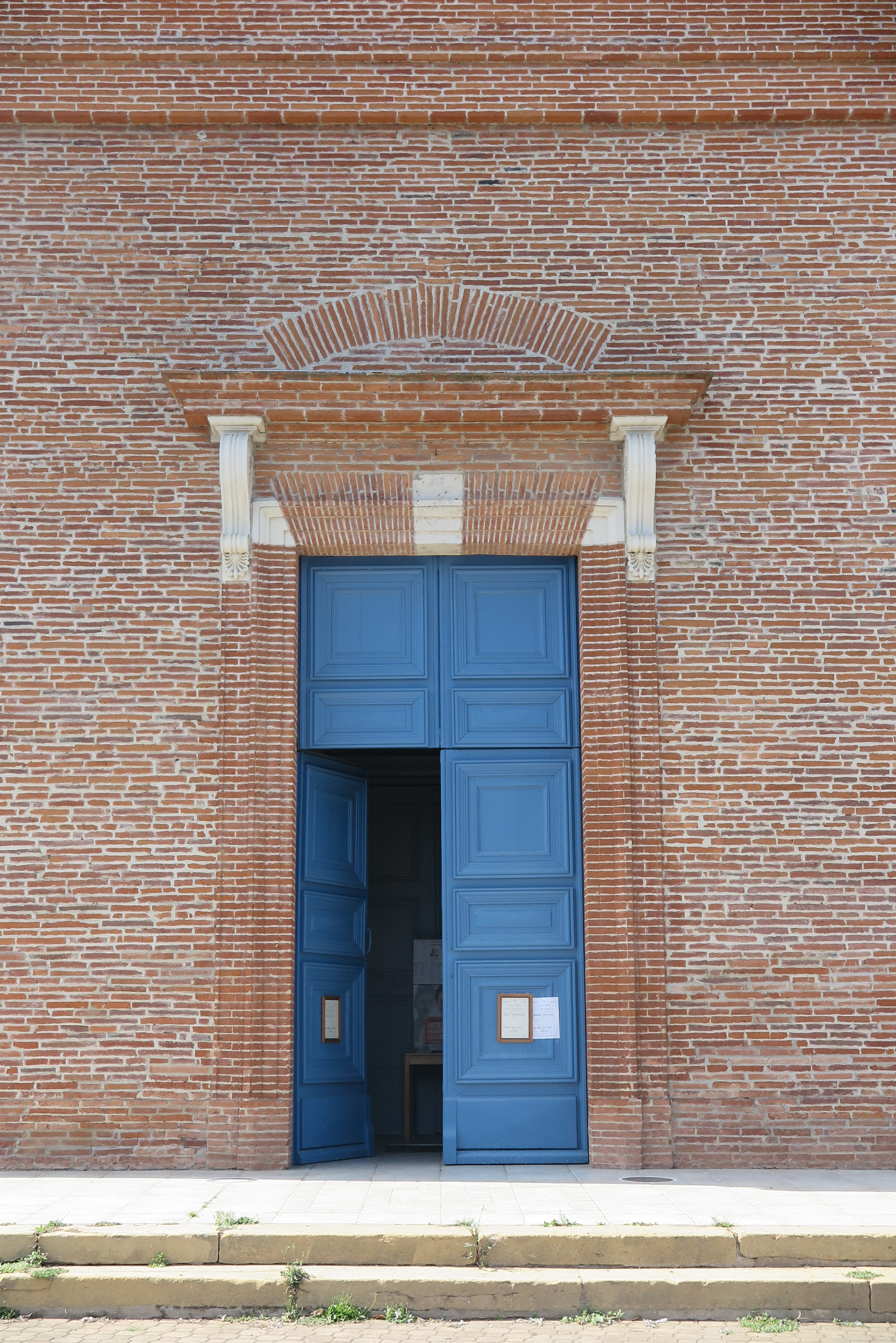

== See also ==
- Communes of the Haute-Garonne department
