= Cugnaux =

- Commune
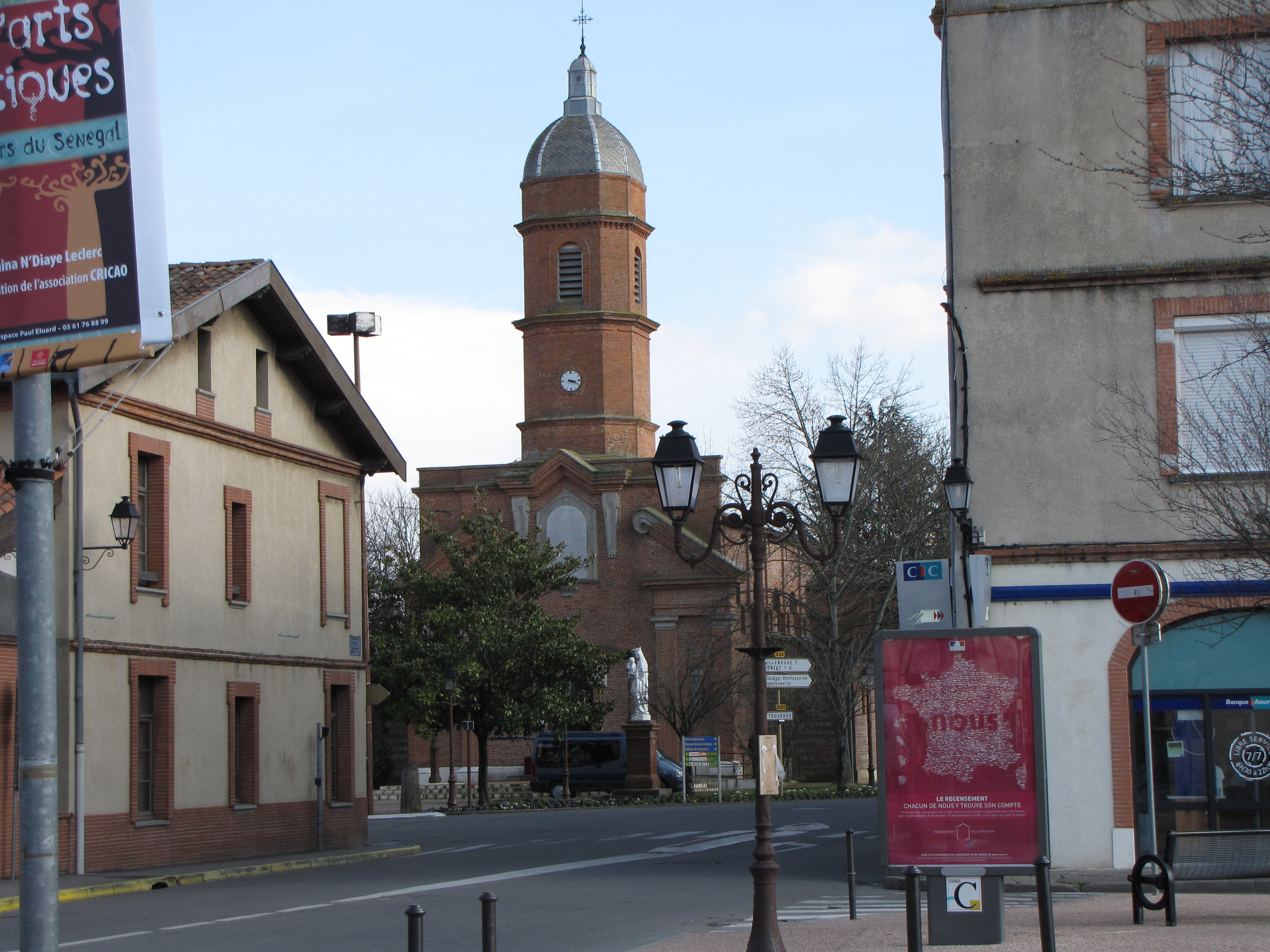
- A view within Cugnaux

- Coat of arms
- Location of Cugnaux
- Location within France Location within Occitanie
- Coordinates: 43°32′19″N 1°20′40″E
- Country: France
- Region: Occitania
- Department: Haute-Garonne
- Arrondissement: Toulouse
- Canton: Tournefeuille
- Intercommunality: Toulouse Métropole

Government
  - Mayor (2020–2026): Albert Sanchez
- Area^{1}: 13.01 km^{2} (5.02 sq mi)
- Elevation: 165 m (541 ft)
- Highest elevation: 170 m (560 ft)
- Lowest elevation: 150 m (490 ft)
- Population (2023): 20,662
  - Density: 1,588/km^{2} (4,113/sq mi)
- Time zone: UTC+01:00 (CET)
  - Summer (DST): UTC+02:00 (CEST)
- INSEE/Postal code: 31157 /31270
- ^{1} French Land Register data, which excludes lakes, ponds, glaciers > 1 km^{2} (0.386 sq mi or 247 acres) and river estuaries.

Cugnaux (French pronunciation: [kyɲo]; Languedocien: Cunhaus) is a commune in the Haute-Garonne department in southwestern France.

== Population ==
The inhabitants of the commune are known as Cugnalais in French.

Historical population
Year	Pop.	±% p.a.
1968	6,228	—
1975	9,516	+6.24%
1982	9,461	−0.08%
1990	11,311	+2.26%
1999	12,997	+1.56%
2007	16,047	+2.67%
2012	16,314	+0.33%
2017	17,974	+1.96%
2023	20,662	+2.35%
Source: INSEE

== Twin towns ==
Cugnaux is twinned with these

- Cavarzere, Italy (Since 2002)
- Camargo, Spain
- Riverdale, United States

== See also ==
- Communes of the Haute-Garonne department
