= Autoroutes of France =

Highway system of France

Map of French autoroutes in 2012

The autoroute (French: [otoʁut], highway or motorway) system in France consists largely of toll roads (76% of the total). It is a network of 11,882 km (7,383 mi) of motorways as of 2014. On road signs, autoroute destinations are shown in blue, while destinations reached through a combination of autoroutes are shown with an added autoroute logo. Toll autoroutes are signalled with the word péage (toll or toll plaza). All are in metropolitan France except for the A1 (972) in Martinique.

The French autoroute A1

A French motorway.

View source data.
Source: Observatoire national interministériel de la sécurité routière.

== Length ==
Source ASFA., ASFA 2018; Eurostat (road_if_motorwa serie)
View source data.

== Numbering scheme ==
Unlike other motorway systems, there is no systematic numbering system, but there is a clustering of Autoroute numbers based on region.

A1, A3, A4, A5, A6, A10, A13, A14, A15, A16 radiate clockwise from Paris, with A2, A11, and A12 branching from A1, A10, and A13, respectively. A7 begins in Lyon, where A6 ends. A8 and A9 begin from the A7.

The 20s are found in northern and northwestern France. The 30s are found in eastern and northeastern France. The 40s are found near the Alps. The 50s are in the southeast, near the French Riviera. The 60s are found in southern France. The 70s are found in the center of the country. The 80s are found in western France, except for the A89 autoroute, which goes from southwestern to eastern France.

== Named routes ==

Autoroutes are often given a name, even if these are not very used:

- A1 is the autoroute du Nord (Northern motorway).
- A4 is the autoroute de l'Est (Eastern motorway).
- A6 and A7 are autoroutes du Soleil (Motorways of the Sun), as both lead from northern France to the sunny beach resorts of southern France.
- A8 is named La provençale as it cross the geographical region of Provence.
- A9 is named La Languedocienne as it crosses the geographic region of Languedoc and also La Catalane because it leads to the region Catalonia in Spain.
- A10 is named L'Aquitaine because it leads to Bordeaux and the region Nouvelle-Aquitaine.
- A11 is named L'Oceane because it leads to the Atlantic Ocean (Nantes).
- A13 is named the autoroute de Normandie as it traverses the region Normandy.
- A16 is named L'Européenne (the European) because it connects Paris with several European destinations such as the Belgium–France border, as well as Calais, which is connected with England.
- A20 is named L'occitane as it leads to the region Occitanie in south-west France.
- A21 is named the rocade minière (mining road) because it crosses the Nord-Pas de Calais Mining Basin, the largest mining stub in France.
- A26 is named the autoroute des Anglais (motorway of the English) as it connects Calais, the main point of arrival for cars and lorries from the UK, with the south of France, bypassing Paris. In addition, it passes near the sites of the most famous battles fought by the British Army in World War I, such as Arras, Cambrai, and the Somme and not far from Ypres and Mons in Belgium. It also passes sites of earlier UK interest such as Crecy and The Field of the Cloth of Gold.
- A35 is called l'Alsacienne or autoroute des Cigognes (Storks' motorways) as it passes only through the historical region of Alsace, for whom storks are a cultural symbol.
- A36 is called la Comtoise after the old region Franche Comté.
- A40 is named the autoroute blanche (white motorway) as it connects the French winter resort towns and the Alps.
- The A61 and A62 are named autoroute des deux mers (the two seas motorway) because these roads connect the Atlantic Ocean and the Mediterranean Sea from Bordeaux via Toulouse to Narbonne.
- A64 is the Autoroute to Pau, Bordeaux and Bayonne, accessible from Tarbes and Lourdes.
- A68 is called autoroute du Pastel because it leads to Albi and to the Lauragais where woad was cultivated to produce pastel.
- A71 is called L'Arverne.
- A75 is called La Méridienne.
- A77 is called Autoroute de l'Arbre.
- A84 is called Autoroute des Estuaires. It is part of the main route between Belgium and Spain, avoiding Paris.
- A104, one of Paris's beltways, is also known as La Francilienne because it circles the region of Ile-de-France.

== Administration ==
The status of motorways in France has been the subject of debate through years, from their construction until recently. Originally, the autoroutes were built by private companies mandated by the French government and followed strict construction rules as described below. They are operated and maintained by mixed companies held in part by private interests and in part by the state. Those companies hold concessions, which means that autoroutes belong to the French state and their administration to semi-private companies. Vinci controls around 4,380 km (2,720 mi) of motorway. The different companies are as follows:

- ALIS (SEM, SAPN 8%, Bouygues 20.2%, Ixis 26%, DTP Terrassement 13.44%), operating the A28 Rouen-Alençon 125 km, Alis, official site
- APRR (Autoroutes Paris-Rhin-Rhône), 1801 km, APRR, official site
- AREA (Société des Autoroutes Rhône-Alpes, APRR Subsidiary at 99.82%), 381 km, AREA, official site
- ASF (Autoroutes du sud de la France), 2325 km, ASF, official site (bought by vinci-autoroutes.com Vinci)
- ATMB (Autoroutes et tunnels du Mont-Blanc), 107 km, ATMB, official site
- CEVM (Viaduc de Millau, groupe Eiffage), 2.5 km, CEVM, official site
- Cofiroute (Compagnie Industrielle et Financière des Autoroutes, private company part of Vinci group), 896 km, Cofiroute, official site
- Escota (Société des Autoroutes Esterel-Côte d'Azur, ASF group), 460 km, Escota, official site (bought by vinci-autoroutes.com Vinci)
- SANEF (Société des autoroutes du Nord et de l'Est de la France), A.C.S. group (Spain), 1317 km, SANEF, official site
- SANEF Paris Normandie (Société des autoroutes Paris-Normandie, SEM, groupe Sanef), 366 km, SAPN, official site
- SFTRF, Société française du tunnel routier du Fréjus, 67 km, SFRTF, official site

Only in the Brittany region do most of the autoroutes belong to the government. They are operated by the regional council and are free from tolls.

Privately managed	
View source data.	View source data.
Source ASFA

== Safety on French autoroutes ==
=== Motorway speed limits ===
France has the following speed limits for limited access roads classified as motorways:

- Under normal conditions - 130 km/h (80 mph)
- In rain or wet road conditions - 110 km/h (70 mph)
- In heavy fog or snowy/icy conditions - 50 km/h (30 mph)

Limited access roads classified as express roads have lower speed limit (90 or 110 km/h, 55 or 70 mph).

In normal conditions, there is a minimum speed of 80 km/h (50 mph) in the leftmost lane. There is no minimum speed on the others lanes, however the speed must be adapted to the conditions and not constitute a hazard by being too slow.

=== Safe design ===
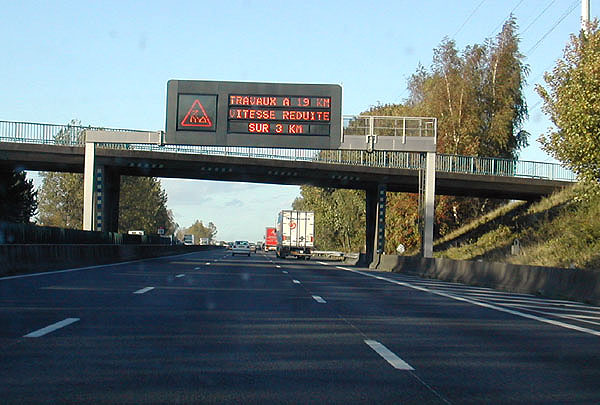
Dynamic information panel used on the French Autoroute.

The autoroutes are designed to increase driver safety and allow for higher speed limits (130 km/h or 80 mph) than on regular roads (80 km/h or 50 mph) without increasing the risk of accidents.

The safety features include:

- one way driving: the lanes driving in the opposite direction are separated by at least a crash barrier designed to resist the oblique impact of a car at up to 180 km/h (110 mph); there are no intersecting roads but overpasses and underpasses;
- wider carriageways, with at least 2 (often 3) lanes driving in the same direction, with a larger turning radius - some recently built autoroutes have one-lane-only sections; for privately operated motorways, in 2017, the proportion is 6800 km (74%) in 2x2 lanes, 2252 km (25%) in 2x3 lanes, 84 km (1%) in 2x4 lanes. Each lane is 3.5m wide.
- long entrance and exit ramps or slip roads to get in or out of the autoroute without disturbing the traffic;
- an emergency lane, where it is forbidden to drive (except for emergency services), to park (except in case of emergency) and to walk; Since 2000, new emergency lanes on newly built motorways should be 2.5m wide (or 3m if there are more than 2000 trucks a day). According to the 2000 standard, the emergency lane must be included in a 10m wide (8.5m for sections limited to 110 km/h) security zone without obstacles (in case the security zone includes an upwards slope, it is limited to the line where the slope reaches a height of 3m).
- presence of emergency call boxes every 2 km (1.2 mi) on each side, that allow to call for help with the possibility to locate the call; some call boxes have flashing light that warn when there is a problem ahead;

Sign indicating a picnic place in an aire de repos.

- rest areas (aire de repos, i.e. car park with public toilets) every 10 km (6.2 mi) (4–6 minutes of driving) and service areas (aire de service with a least a gas station) every 40 km (25 mi) (20–30 minutes of driving) - on most recently built autoroutes these distances may be longer, up to 30/60km;
- regularly patrolling security services, to clear any obstacle and protect drivers in trouble (usually a breakdown or a flat tyre) with appropriate warning signs and beacons;
- dynamic information panels that warn about possible difficulties ahead (e.g. accident, roadworks, traffic jam);
- a radio station (107.7 MHz in FM) provides traffic information bulletins every 15 minutes (with a report in English in certain areas) and breaking news for emergencies;
- on heavy traffic days (e.g. beginning and end of school holidays), specific information and recreation events may be organised in rest areas;
- radars automatiques (speed cameras) are installed in many locations, and announced by a specific road sign.

=== Safety results ===
Fatalities on motorways have decreased between 2002 and 2016.

Fatalities
View source data.
Source ASFA

=== Fatalities accidents scenario ===
On French motorways, in 2016, 121 fatal accidents are direct/initial accidents representing 82% of fatal accidents, 16 (11%) fatal accidents occurs after a previous accident, and 10 (7%) fatal accidents occur after an incident.

Three scenarios catch two-thirds of initial accidents:

- A01 simple collision of two vehicle without direction change
- A06 crash on protection system such as safety traffic barrier
- A05 loss of vehicle control

=== Fatalities and accidents remaining factors ===
Most of fatalities occur by night.

Fatal accident by Light condition	Fatal accident cause
View source data.	View source data.
Source Sécurité routière	Source ASFA

Several factor of accidents are more highly probable by night in proportion to the traffic, although inattentiveness remains risky during the day.

Influence of time on the risk of accident
(% of accidents divided by % of traffic)
View source data.
View source data.
View source data.
View source data.
View source data.
View source data.
Source ASFA

=== Young drivers ===
Young drivers between 18 and 34 years old represent 19% of motorway drivers, but they are overrepresented in fatal motor vehicle collisions and are involved in more than half of fatal accidents.

Involvement of young drivers in 2016, in fatal accidents
young drivers in dangerous manoeuvre	young drivers in inattentiveness	young drivers in excessive speeding
View source data.	View source data.	View source data.
Source ASFA

=== Pedestrians ===
Although pedestrians are forbidden on motorways in conformity with the Vienna Convention, they are still sometimes killed on motorways.

In case a vehicle on a carriage cannot move, motorways safety rules remains applicable: it is forbidden for a pedestrian to travel on the motorway by article 421-2 from the "Code de la route" law. For this reason, in case of accident or breakdown, it is advised to turn on hazard warning lights, wear high-visibility clothing, and go in a safer place such as the other side from the traffic barrier where there is no traffic. Since 2008, it is clarified that warning triangles are no longer mandatory when they would endanger the driver of the disabled vehicle.

Pedestrians killed in 2016
Place where pedestrians are killed	Reason for pedestrian presence
View source data.	View source data.
Source ASFA

== Economics ==
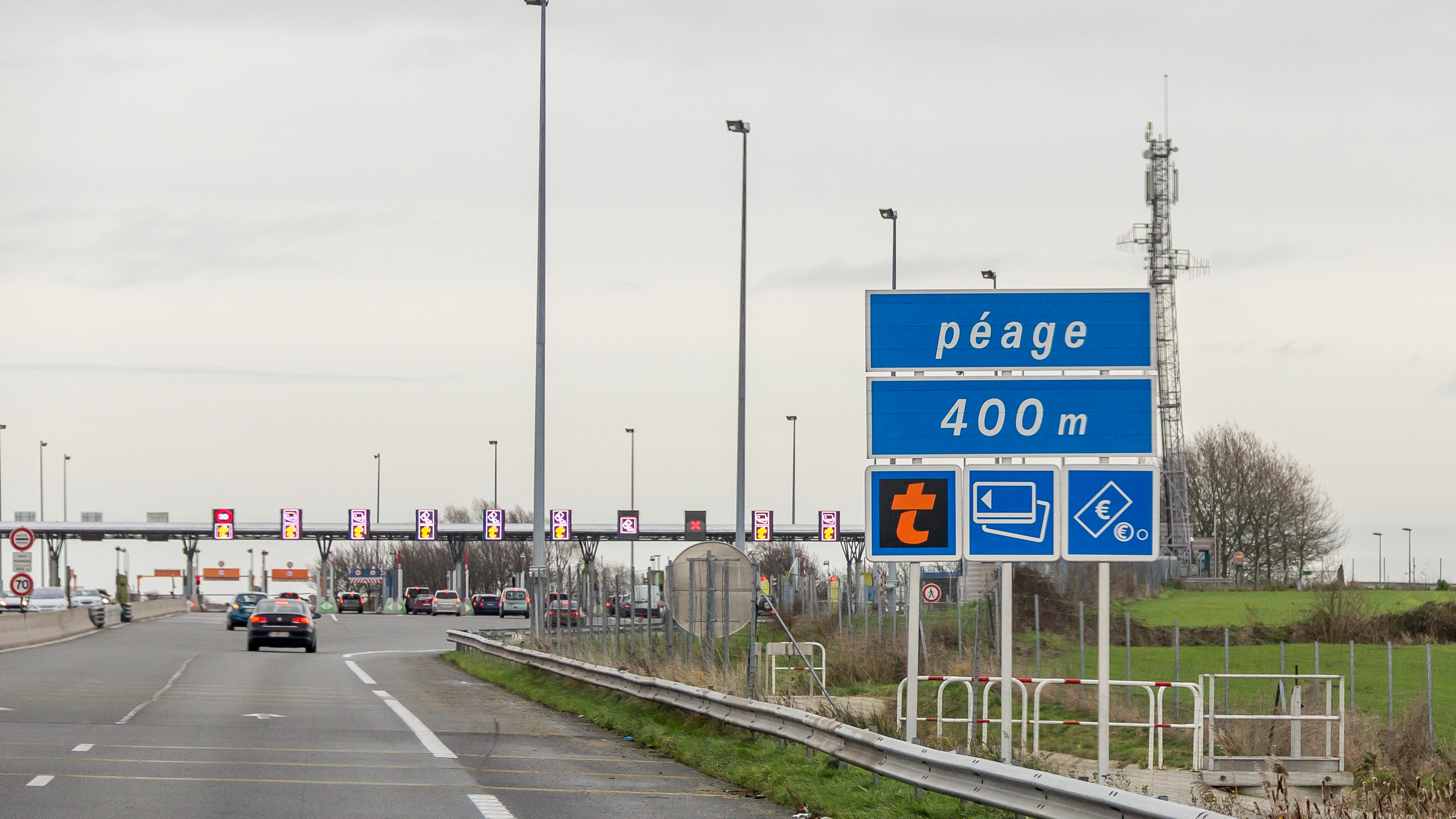
Toll barrier in Hordain (north of France), on autoroute A2

The toll roads were granted as concessions to mixed-economy corporations; the free roads are directly administered by the national government. Tolls are either based on a flat-rate for access to the road or on the distance driven. The latter case is the most common for long distances; users take a ticket from an automatic machine when they enter the autoroute, and pay according to the distance when exiting; toll booths accept multiple payment methods.

Sign indicating a péage.

In 2005, the Villepin government proposed a controversial plan to sell all of the state's holdings in autoroute companies to private investors. Critics contend that the price announced is well below the profit forecasts for these companies, and thus that the government sacrifices the future to solve current budgetary problems.

Mode of payment
View source data.
Source ASFA

== List of autoroutes ==
Number	Length (km)	Length (mi)	Southern or western terminus	Northern or eastern terminus	Route name	Formed	Removed	Notes
A 1	211	131	Boulevard Périphérique at Porte de la Chapelle, Paris	A25/N 356 in Lille	Autoroute du Nord	1954	current	Part of E 15 / E 17 / E 19 / E 42
A 2	77.6	48.2	A1 in Combles	Belgian border near Saint-Aybert		1972	current	Part of E 19
A 3	18.4	11.4	Boulevard Périphérique at Porte de Bagnolet, Paris	A1 in Roissy-en-France		1969	current	Part of E 15
A 4	477	296	Boulevard Périphérique at Porte de Bercy, Paris	Strasbourg	Autoroute de l'Est	1970	current	Part of E 17 / E 25 / E 46 / E 50 / E 54
A 5	238	148	N 104 in Tigery	A31 near Beauchemin	La Champenoise	1990	current	Part of E 17 / E 54 / E 511
A 5a	—	—	A5	N 104		—	—	Western link between A 5 and N 104; renumbered to A5
A 5b	—	—	A5	N 104		—	—	Northern link between A 5 and N 104; renumbered to A105
A 6	446	277	M 6 in Limonest	A6a/A6b in Wissous	Autoroute du Soleil	1960	current	Part of E 15 / E 21 / E 60 / E 70
A 6a	10	6.2	A6/A10 in Wissous	Boulevard Périphérique at Porte d'Orléans, Paris	Autoroute du Soleil	1960	current	Part of E 5
A 6b	10	6.2	A6/A10 in Wissous	Boulevard Périphérique at Porte d'Italie, Paris	Autoroute du Soleil	1969	current	Part of E 15 / E 50
A 7	306	190	Marseille	M 7 in Lyon	Autoroute du Soleil	1951	current	Part of E 15 / E 80 / E 712 / E 714
A 8	224	139	La Fare-les-Oliviers (A7)	Italy (A10) (Menton)	La Provençale	1961	current	Part of E 74 / E 80
A 9	281	175	Spanish border at Le Perthus	A7 in Orange	La Languedocienne; La Catalane	1960	current	Part of E 15 / E 80
A 10	557	346	Rocade de Bordeaux (A630/N 230) in Bordeaux	A6a/A6b in Wissous	L'Aquitaine	1960	current	Part of E 5 / E 50 / E 60 / E 606
A 11	323	201	Périphérique (A844) in Nantes	A10 in Ponthévrard	L'Océane	1966	current	Part of E 50 / E 60 / E 501
A 12	8.5	5.3	N 10 in Montigny-le-Bretonneux	A13 in Bailly	Autoroute de Bretagne	1950	current	
A 13	225	140	Périphérique (N 814) at Porte de Paris, Caen	Boulevard Périphérique at Porte d'Auteuil, Paris	Autoroute de Normandie	1940	current	Part of E 5 / E 46 / E 402
A 13a	3	1.9	A13 in Rosny-sur-Seine	D 113/D 915 in Bonnières-sur-Seine	Bretellede Bonnières-sur-Seine	—	—	Branch of A13
A 14	21	13	N 13 in La Défense	A13 in Orgeval		1996	current	
A 15	24	15	A86/N 315 in Gennevilliers	N 14 in Cergy		1974	current	
A 16	312	194	N 104 in Attainville	Belgian border in Ghyvelde	L'Européenne	1991	current	Part of E 15 / E 40 / E 44 / E 402
A 17	—	—	Paris	Fontenay-sous-Bois		—	1973	Proposed but never built
A 18	—	—	Paris	Marnes-la-Coquette / Versailles / Vélizy-Villacoublay / Le Chesnay		—	1976	Proposed but never built
A 19	—	—	Paris	Rueil-Malmaison (A86)		1965	—	Proposed but never built
A 19	—	—	Paris	Melun		—	—	Proposed but never built; later incorporated into the A5
A 19	131	81	Artenay (A10)	Sens (A5)	L'Éco Autoroute	1993	current	Part of E 60 / E 511
A 20	428	266	Montauban (A62)	Vierzon (A71)	L'Occitane	1992	current	Part of E 9 / E 70
A 21	58.9	36.6	Bully-les-Mines (D 301 / A26)	Douchy-les-Mines (A2)	Rocade Minière	1971	current	
A 22	15.8	9.8	Ronchin (A1) Villeneuve-d'Ascq (N 227)	Villeneuve-d'Ascq (N 227) Belgian border in Neuville-en-Ferrain	Autoroute du Nord	1972	current	Part of E 17; gap in route connected by N 227
A 23	42.7	26.5	Lesquin (A27)	La Sentinelle (A2)		1978	current	
A 24	—	—	Amiens	Belgian border		1980	2011	Proposed but never built
A 25	62.7	39.0	Lille (A1)	Dinkirk (Dunkerque)		1963	current	Part of E 42
A 26	395	245	Troyes (A5)	Calais (A16)	Autoroute des Anglais	1976	current	Part of E 15 / E 17 / E 50
A 27	13.7	8.5	Lesquin (A22)	Belgian border in Camphin-en-Pévèle		1973	current	Part of E 42
A 28	366.5	227.7	Abbeville (A16)	Tours (A10)	Autoroute des Estuaires	2005	current	Part of E 44 / E 402 / E 502
A 29	183	114	Beuzeville (A13)	Saint-Quentin (A26)		1995	current	Part of E 44 / E 402
A 30	25	16	Uckange (A31)	Crusnes (N 52)	Autoroute de la Vallée de la Fensch	1963	current	Part of E 44 / E 411
A 31	351	218	Beaune (A6)	Luxembourg border at Zoufftgen	Autoroute de Lorraine-Bourgogne	1966	current	Part of E 17 / E 21 / E 23 / E 25 / E 54 / E 60
A 31 bis	—	—	Fameck	Thionville		proposed	—	
A 32	—	—	Freyming-Merlebach (A4)	German border		1972	1996	Renumbered to A320
A 32	—	—	Toul	Luxembourg border		—	2010	Proposed but never built
A 33	26.8	16.7	Nancy (A31)	Hudiviller (N 4)		1953	current	Local autoroute around Nancy; Part of E 23
A 34	98	61	Reims (A4)	Sedan (N 43)	L'Ardennaise	1973	current	Part of E 44 / E 46 / E 420
A 35	172	107	Swiss border in Saint-Louis	German border in Scheibenhard	Autoroute des Cigognes; L'Alsacienne	1965	current	Part of E 25 / E 60
A 36	237	147	A31 in Bourgogne-Franche-Comté	German border in Ottmarsheim	La Comtoise	1986	current	Part of E 54 / E 60
A 37	—	—	Beaune	Dijon		1974	1982	Became a portion of the A31
A 38	37	23	Pouilly-en-Auxois (A6)	Dijon (M 274)	La Côte-d'Orienne	1973	current	
A 39	144	89	Dijon (M 905)	Bourg-en-Bresse (A40)	Autoroute Verte; La Bressane	1992	current	
A 40	205.9	127.9	Mâcon (A6)	Passy (N 205) (Mont Blanc Tunnel)	Autoroute Blanche; Autoroute des Titans	1973	current	Part of E 21 / E 25 / E 62
A 41	112.9	70.2	Swiss border in Saint-Julien-en-Genevois	N 90/D 1090 in Meylan	LIANE (LIaison Annecy Nord Express); L'Alpine	1975	current	Part of E 21 / E 62 / E 70 / E 712
A 42	52.3	32.5	Lyon	Bourg-en-Bresse (Pont-d'Ain) (A40)	Autoroute de la Vallée du Rhône	1987	current	Part of E15 / E 611
A 43	208	129	Lyon	Italian border at the Fréjus Road Tunnel	Autoroute de la Maurienne	1973	current	Part of E 70 / E 711 / E 712
A 44	—	—	Limonest (A6)	Vienne (A7)		—	—	Lyon western bypass proposed but never built
A 45	—	—	Lyon	Saint-Étienne		1993	2018	Proposed but never built
A 46	47.6	29.6	Anse (A6)	Givors (A7 / A47)	La Lyonnaise	1992	current	Lyon eastern bypass Part of E 50 / E 70
A 47	29.5	18.3	Givors (A7 / A46)	Saint-Étienne (Saint-Chamond) (N 88)	L'Urbaine	1962	current	
A 48	52.5	32.6	Bourgoin-Jallieu (A43)	Grenoble (A480)	Autoroute du Dauphiné	1968	current	Part of E 711 / E 713
A 49	70.4	43.7	Moirans (A48)	Romans-sur-Isère (N 532)		1992	current	Part of E 713
A 50	70	43	Marseille	Toulon (A57)		1962	current	
A 51	172	107	Marseille (Septèmes-les-Vallons) (A7) Grenoble (Claix) (A480)	Gap (La Saulce) Col du Fau	Autoroute du val de Durance; Autoroute du Trièves	1953	current	Part of E 712
A 52	25.3	15.7	Fuveau (A8)	Aubange (A50)		1974	current	
A 54	49	30	Nîmes (A9)	Salon-de-Provence (A7)	La Camarguaise	1970	current	Part of E 80
A 55	36.7	22.8	Marseille (La Joliette)	Martigues (RN 568)	Autoroute du Littoral	1972	current	
A 56	—	—	Salon (A54)	Fos-sur-Mer (A55)		proposed	—	
A 57	52	32	Toulon (A50)	Le Cannet-des-Maures (A8)	La Toulonnaise	1964	current	
A 58	—	—	Mandelieu-la-Napoule	La Turbie		—	2006	Proposed but never built; known as A8 bis until 1996
A 61	147.5	91.7	Toulouse (A62)	Narbonne (A9)	Autoroute des Deux Mers	1978	current	Part of E 9 / E 80
A 62	242	150	A630 (Rocade de Bordeaux) in Bordeaux	Périphérique (A61) in Toulouse	Autoroute des Deux Mers	1975	current	Part of E 9 / E 72
A 63	206	128	A630 (Rocade de Bordeaux) in Bordeaux	Spanish border at Biriatou	Autoroute de la Côte Basque; Autoroute des Landes; Autoroute des Estuaires	1972	current	Part of E 5 / E 70 / E 80
A 64	287	178	Périphérique (A620) in Toulouse	Bayonne (A63)	La Pyrénéenne	1977	current	Part of E 7 / E 80
A 65	153	95	Langon (A62)	Pau (A64)	Autoroute de Gascogne	2010	current	Part of E 7
A 66	39.1	24.3	Vieillevigne (A61)	Pamiers (N 20)	L'Ariégeoise	2002	current	Part of E 9
A 68	61.9	38.5	Périphérique (A62/A61) in Toulouse	Albi (N 88)	Autoroute du Pastel	1992	current	
A 69	62	39	Castelmaurou (A68)	Castres		—	—	Under construction
A 71	290.5	180.5	Orléans (A10)	Clermont-Ferrand (A75)	L'Arverne	1986	current	Part of E 9 / E 11 / E 62 / E 70 / E 604
A 72	56	35	Saint-Étienne (N 88)	Nervieux (A89)	L'Autoroute de la Loire	1975	current	
A 75	335	208	Clermont-Ferrand (A71)	Béziers (A9)	La Méridienne	1989	current	Part of E 11
A 77	161	100	Poligny (A6)	Nevers (N 7)	Autoroute de l'Arbre	1981	current	
A 79	92	57	Montmarault (A71)	Digoin (N 79)	La Bourbonnaise	2022	current	Part of E 62
A 81	94.8	58.9	Le Mans (A11)	La Gravelle (N 157)	L'Armoricaine	1982	current	Part of E 50
A 82	2	1.2	Orvault (A844)	Sautron (N 165)	La Bretonne	—	—	Part of E 60
A 83	152.5	94.8	Nantes (N 844)	Niort (A10)		2001	current	Part of E 3
A 84	170.5	105.9	Caen (Porte de Bretagne)	Rennes	Autoroute des Estuaires	2003	current	Part of E 3 / E 401
A 85	270	170	Angers (Corzé) (A11)	Vierzon (Theillay) (A71)		1997	current	Part of E 60 / E 604
A 86	80.1	49.8	Ring road around Paris		Le Superpériphérique	2009	current	
A 87	142	88	Angers (Écouflant) (A11)	La Roche-sur-Yon (D 160)	Autoroute de Vendée	2002	current	
A 87	—	—	Ring road around Paris			1965	1982	Proposed but never built; some completed sections are now the A104 and A126
A 88	117.7	73.1	Falaise (N 158)	Sées (A28)		2010	current	
A 89	544	338	Bordeaux (Libourne) (N 89)	Lyon (Limonest) (A6/M6)	La Transeuropéenne (also known as the Autoroute des présidents or La Transcorrézienne	1991	current	Part of E 70
A 102	—	—	—	—		—	—	Renumbered to A104
A 103	1	0.62	Rosny-sous-Bois (A3)	Villemomble	Antenne de Villemomble	—	—	Spur of A3
A 104	30	19	Épiais-lès-Louvres (A1)	Collégien (A4)	La Francilienne	1980	current	Francilienne around the Île-de-France region
A 105	10	6.2	Combs-la-Ville (N 104)	Melun (N 105)	Antenne de Melun	—	—	Formerly designated A5b; branch of A5 Part of E 54
A 106	4.6	2.9	Rungis (A6a/A6b)	Orly Airport	Antenne d'Orly	—	—	
A 110	—	—	Chartres (A11)	Tours (A10, A28, A85)	Autoroute de la Beauce	—	—	Proposed but never built
A 112	—	—	Bailly (A12)	Rueil-Malmaison (A86)		—	—	Proposed but never built; planned extension of A12
A 115	12.3	7.6	Sannois (A15)	Méry-sur-Oise (N 184)	Antenne de Taverny	1976	current	
A 120	—	—	Vert-en-Drouais (A154)	Dreux (N 12)		proposed	—	Planned upgrade of N 12
A 126	7	4.3	Palaiseau (D 35)	Chilly-Mazarin (A6)	Antenne de Chilly-Mazarin	1976	current	Initially designated as A 87
A 131	36	22	Bourneville (A13)	Le Havre		1974	current	Part of E 5
A 132	5.5	3.4	Pont-l'Évêque (A13/D 579)	Canapville (D 677)		—	—	
A 133	—	—	Quincampoix	Incarville		proposed	—	
A 134	—	—	Gouy	Saint-Étienne-du-Rouvray		proposed	—	
A 139	3	1.9	Oissel (A13)	Grand-Couronne (N 138)		1970	current	Formerly A 930
A 140	3	1.9	Quincy-Voisins (A4)	Villenoy (N 330)		1970	current	Section from exit 2 to the roundabout at Meaux redesignated to A2140 (now D 360)
A 147	—	—	Limoges	Poitiers		2018	2023	Proposed but never built
A 150	32.4	20.1	Rouen (N 338)	Les Hauts-de-Caux (A29)		2015	current	Former portion of A15
A 151	18	11	Roumare (A150)	Varneville-Bretteville (N 27)		—	—	
A 154	9	5.6	Acquigny (N 154)	Val-de-Reuil (A13)		—	—	
A 159	—	—	—	—		—	—	Renumbered to A151
A 160	—	—	—	—		—	—	Renumbered to A19
A 170	8	5.0	Gonesse (A1/A3/D 170)	Mitry-Mory (A104)		—	—	Former section of the A104
A 186	—	—	Interchange with A3	Montreuil		—	2019	Decommissioned for the extension of Line 1 of the Île-de-France tramway
A 199	—	—	Torcy	Champs-sur-Marne		1974	2006	Formerly H3; downgraded to D 199
A 203	—	—	Sedan	Charleville-Mézières		1976	2006	Renumbered to A34
A 211	3.5	2.2	Avion (N 17)	Lens (A21)		1976	current	Branch of A21
A 216	3	1.9	Calais (A16/A26)	Calais (N 216)		—	—	
A 260	—	—	Setques (A26)	Boulogne-sur-Mer (A16)		—	2012	Proposed but never built; planned upgrade of RN 42
A 283	—	—	Caen	Sées		—	—	Renumbered to A88
A 304	31	19	La Francheville (A34)	Belgium (N 5) (Gué-d'Hossus)	Autoroute des Ardennes	2005	current	Part of E 44 / E 420
A 311	5	3.1	Perrigny-lès-Dijon (A31)	Longvic (M 274)		—	—	Branch of A31
A 313	2.5	1.6	Pont-à-Mousson (D 120)	Atton (A31)		—	—	Branch of A31
A 314	3	1.9	Metz (M 603)	Lauvallières (A4)		—	—	Former A32
A 315	4	2.5	Metz (N 431)	Mey (A4)	Messine; Bifurcation de Mey	1984	current	
A 319	—	—	Flagey (A31)	Vesoul (N 19)		—	—	Proposed but never built
A 320	13.7	8.5	A4 in Freyming-Merlebach	German border in Stiring-Wendel		1996	current	Former A32
A 330	11	6.8	Flavigny-sur-Moselle (N 57)	Nancy (M 674)		—	—	
A 340	—	—	Brumath (A4)	Haguenau	D1340 Antenne de Haguenau	1973	2021	Downgraded to D 1340
A 344	10	6.2	Thillois (A4)	Cormontreuil (A34)	Traversée urbaine de Reims	2010	current	Former routing of A4 through Reims
A 346	—	—	A140	Meaux		—	2008	Downgraded to D 346
A 350	—	—	A35	Schiltigheim		1983	2015	Downgraded to N 2350, now M 2350
A 351	—	—	Strasbourg (M 35)	Oberschaeffolsheim (D 1004)		1972	2021	Turned over to Strasbourg and downgraded to M 351
A 352	8.6	5.3	Duttlenheim (A35/A355)	Dorlisheim (D 1420)		—	—	
A 354	—	—	A35 in Strasbourg	D 63 in Strasbourg		—	—	Renumbered to A350
A 355	24	15	Duttlenheim (A35/A352)	Vendenheim (A35/A4)	Grand contournement ouest de Strasbourg	2016	current	Strasbourg western bypass Part of E 25
A 391	4.5	2.8	Poligny	A39 exit 7		—	—	Branch of A39
A 401	—	—	Saint-Julien-en-Genevois (A40)	Swiss (A1) (Saint-Julien-en-Genevois)		1991	2008	Absorbed into the A41
A 404	20.6	12.8	Saint-Martin-du-Frêne (A40)	Arbent (D 31)		1997	current	
A 406	11	6.8	Charnay-lès-Mâcon (N 79)	Saint-André-de-Bâgé (A40)		2011	current	Mâcon southern bypass Part of E 62
A 410	25	16	Villy-le-Pelloux (A41)	Scientrier (A40)		2008	current	Former routing of the A41; Part of E 712
A 411	2	1.2	Étrembières (A40)	Swiss border at Gaillard	Autoroute Blanche	1982	current	Former section of the A40; Part of E 712
A 412	—	—	Machilly (D 1206)	Thonon-les-Bains (D 1005)	Autoroute du Chablais	proposed	—	
A 430	15	9.3	Aiton (A43)	Gilly-sur-Isère (N 90)		1991	current	
A 431	—	—	—	—		—	—	Renumbered to A430/A432
A 432	35	22	Saint-Laurent-de-Mure (A43)	Les Échets (A46)		—	—	Lyon third ring road Part of E 70
A 450	8	5.0	Brignais (D 386)	Pierre-Bénite (A7/M 7)		1966	current	
A 457	—	—	Lyon	Brignais		—	—	Former section of A45, renumbered to A450
A 466	5.4	3.4	A46 in Quincieux (A46)	A6 in Les Chères (A6)		2015	current	Part of E 70
A 480	12.5	7.8	A51 at Claix	A48 at Saint-Égrève/Saint-Martin-le-Vinoux	Autoroute du Drac	1982	current	Grenoble western bypass; former B 48
A 490	—	—	Valence southern ring road			—	—	Downgraded to N 1532; became N 7 in 2002
A 500	2	1.2	La Turbie (A8)	Monaco	Bretelle de Monaco	1992	current	
A 501	5	3.1	Aubagne (A50)	Aubagne (A52)		—	—	Aubagne west ring road
A 502	1.5	0.93	Aubagne (A50)	Aubagne (D 8n)		—	—	
A 507	9.7	6.0	Marseille (A50)	Marseille (A7)	Rocade L2	2016	current	Marseille eastern ring road
A 515	0.9	0.56	Bouc-Bel-Air (A51)	Bouc-Bel-Air		—	—	
A 516	—	—	Aix-en-Provence	A40		—	2018	Downgraded to N 2516
A 517	1.2	0.75	Septèmes-les-Vallons (A7)	Septèmes-les-Vallons (A51)		—	—	
A 520	3	1.9	Roquevaire (A52)	Auriol		—	—	
A 521	—	—	—	—		—	—	Renumbered to A520
A 557	2	1.2	One-direction ring of Marseille downtown			1969	current	
A 570	7	4.3	La Garde (A57)	Hyères (N 98)		1992	current	
A 585	—	—	Digne-les-Bains	A51 at Château-Arnoux-Saint-Auban	Antenne de Digne-les-Bains	—	2012	Proposed but never built
A 601	—	—	—	—		—	—	Renumbered to A621
A 602	—	—	—	—		—	—	Renumbered to A624
A 603	—	—	—	—		—	—	Renumbered to A602; now A624
A 610	—	—	—	—		—	—	Renumbered to A837
A 612	—	—	—	—		—	—	Renumbered to A621; now A61/A62
A 614	—	—	—	—		—	—	Toulouse southern ring road
A 620	20	12	Toulouse (A62)	Toulouse (A61)	Périphérique Ouest de Toulouse	—	—	Toulouse western ring road Part of E 72 / E 80
A 621	5	3.1	Toulouse–Blagnac Airport	Toulouse (A620)		2001	current	
A 623	0.4	0.25	Toulouse (A61/D 916)	Toulouse (A620/M 113A)		—	—	Shortest motorway in France; originally continued to the N 113 (now D 813), but this section was downgraded to the M 113a in 2010
A 624	4	2.5	N 124 in Colomiers	Périphérique (A620) in Toulouse		1988	current	
A 630	45	28	Ring road around Bordeaux		Rocade de Bordeaux	1967	current	Part of E 5 / E 70 / E 72 / E 606
A 631	—	—	A630 exit 21 in Boudeaux	Saint-Jean Bridge, Boudeaux		—	2017	Downgraded to an urban boulevard
A 641	7	4.3	Oeyregave (A64)	Orthevielle (D 33)	Antenne de Peyrehorade	1994	current	
A 645	5.8	3.6	Seilhan (N 125)	Ponlat-Taillebourg (A64)	Antenne de Montréjeau	2004	current	
A 650	—	—	Lescar (A64/A65)	Oloron-Sainte-Marie (N 134)		—	2008	Proposed but never built
A 660	21	13	La Teste-de-Buch (N 250)	Mios (A63)		1975	current	Former A63
A 668	—	—	—	—		—	—	Renumbered to A68
A 680	—	—	Castelmaurou (A68)	Verfeil (N 112)		1996	2025	Renumbered to A69
A 701	—	—	Saran (A10)	Fleury-les-Aubrais (D 2020)		—	2006	Downgraded to D 2701
A 709	23	14	Fabrègues (A9)	Saint-Brès (A9)		2017	current	Former routing of the A9
A 710	7	4.3	Clermond-Ferrand (A71/A89)	Clermont-Ferrand		1987	current	Branch of A71
A 711	11	6.8	Clermont-Ferrand (N 89)	Les Martres-d'Artière (A89)		—	—	Branch of A71; formerly A720
A 712	1.3	0.81	Lempdes (A711)	Champ-Lamet Roundabout (Lempdes)		—	—	Branch of A71
A 714	10	6.2	Bizeneuille (A71)	Saint-Victor (N 145)		2011	current	Branch of A71; former N 145
A 719	23	14	Gannat (A71)	Espinasse-Vozelle (D 2209/D 215/D 906)		1997	current	Branch of A71
A 720	—	—	—	—		—	—	Renumbered to A711
A 750	25	16	Clermont-l'Hérault (A75)	Saint-Georges-d'Orques (N 109)	L'Héraultaise	—	—	
A 800	—	—	—	—		—	—	Renumbered to A500
A 801	—	—	Nantes	A83		—	2006	Downgraded to N 801
A 810	—	—	—	—		—	—	
A 811	6	3.7	Carquefou (A11)	Sainte-Luce-sur-Loire (N 844)		1980	current	
A 813	4	2.5	Banneville-la-Campagne (A13)	Frénouville (N 613)		2012	current	Southeast bypass of Caen
A 821	—	—	Carquefou (A11)	Sautron (A82)		—	2006	Carquefrou to the River Gesvres became a portion of the A11 in 1996, the section along the Nantes ring road was redesignated to A844 in 2000, and the remaining section from Orvault to Sautron was redesignated to A82 in 2006
A 830	—	—	—	—		—	—	Downgraded to D 844
A 831	—	—	Fontenay-le-Comte (A83)	Rochefort (A837)		2005	2015	Proposed but never built
A 837	36.5	22.7	Saintes (A10)	Rochefort (D 137)	Autoroute des Oiseaux	1997	current	Part of E 602
A 844	5	3.1	Nantes (A11)	Orvault (N 844/A82)	Boulevard périphérique de Nantes	1993	current	Nantes northern ring road Part of E 60
A 930	—	—	—	—		—	—	Renumbered to A139
A 932	—	—	—	—		—	—	Renumbered to A132
A 1086	—	—	—	—		—	—	Renumbered to A186
A 1216	—	—	—	—		—	—	Renumbered to A216
A 1501	—	—	—	—		—	—	Renumbered to A151
A 7109	—	—	—	—		—	—	Renumbered to A710
Former; Proposed and unbuilt

=== Others ===
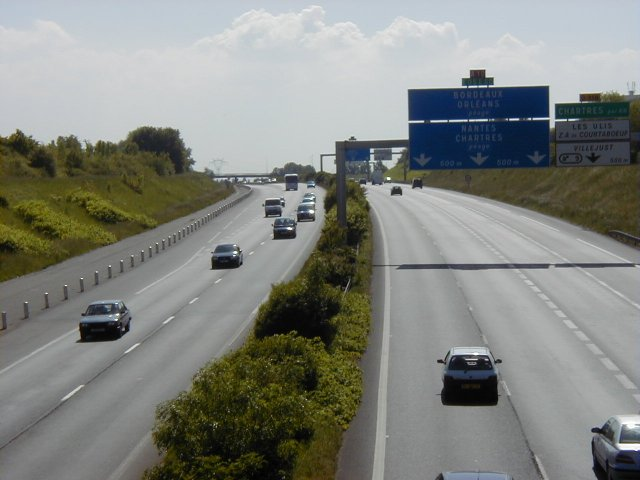
A10 autoroute near Paris

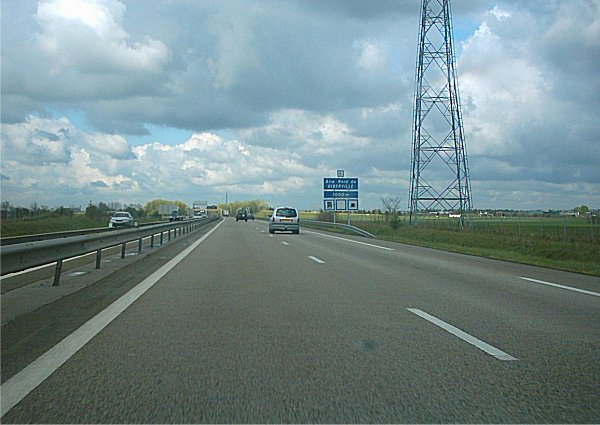
A13 in the outskirts of Caen

- A1(972): Around Fort-de-France. Autoroute in Martinique, a French overseas territory.

== Radio coverage ==
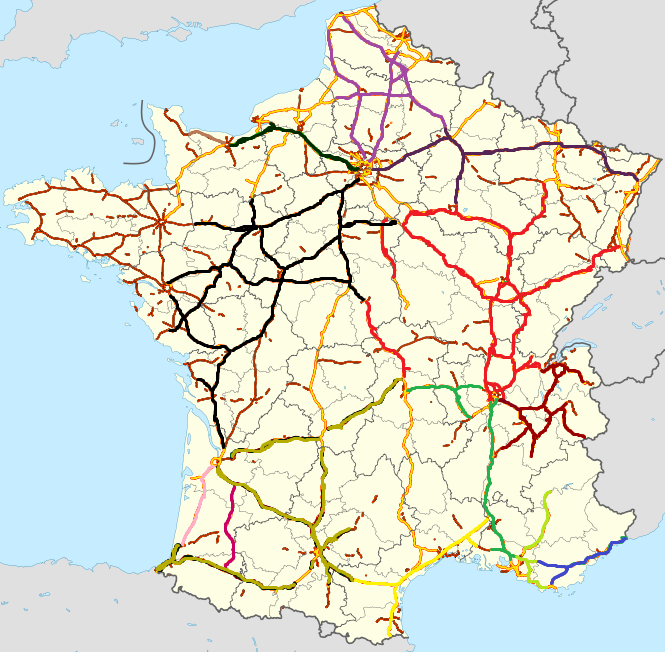
The complete coverage map of FM 107.7.

The FM 107.7 radio coverage is available in 2017 on 8902 kilometres of the (ASFA) network. This is a list of highways that are updated in 107.7 FM every 15 minutes, live 24/7 (if the highway is said alone, it means that the station covers all around it):

=== Sanef 107.7 (1850km) ===
Nord

- A1: Roissy-en-France - Carvin
- A2: A1 - Hordain
- A16: L'Isle-d'Adam - Boulogne-sur-Mer
- A26: Calais - Saint-Quentin
- A29: Neufchâtel-en-Bray - Saint-Quentin

Est

- A4: Noisy-le-Grand - Reichstett
- A26: Saint-Quentin - northern Troyes
- A314
- A315
- A344

Ouest

- A13: Orgeval - Caen
- A14: Carrières-sur-Seine - Orgeval
- A29: (Beuzeville - Saint-Saëns; outside Normandy)
- A132
- A139
- A154
- A813

=== Autoroute INFO (2487km) ===
Centre-Est (live from Dijon)

- A5: Lieusant - Langres
- A6: Fleury-en-Bière - Limonest
- A19: Courtenay - Sens
- A26: northern Troyes - southern Troyes
- A31: Beaune - Toul
- A36: Beaune - Mulhouse
- A39: Dijon - Bourg-en-Bresse
- A40: Mâcon - Bellegarde
- A46: Anse - Vaulx-en-Velin
- A71: Bourges - Clermont-Ferrand
- A77: A6 - Cosne-Cours-sur-Loire
- A105
- A311
- A391
- A406
- A411
- A430
- A714

Rhône-Alpes (live from Chambéry)

- A40: Bellegarde - Le Fayet
- A41: Genève - Chambéry - Grenoble
- A42: Bourg-en-Bresse - Vaulx-en-Velin
- A43: Saint-Priest - Chambéry - Tunnel du Fréjus
- A48: Bourgoin-Jallieu - Saint-Égrève
- A49
- A51: Le Pont de Claix - Col du Fau

== Environment ==
99% of the privately managed network is protected by natural fencing.

Privately managed motorways have 1764 wildlife crossing structures.

== See also ==
- Transport in France
- List of controlled-access highway systems
- Evolution of motorway construction in European nations
