= A64 autoroute =

Road in France

A64 autoroute

Route information
- Part of E7 / E80
- Length: 287 km (178 mi)
- Existed: 1977–present

Major junctions
- West end: E5 / E70 / E80 / A 63 in Saint-Pierre-d'Irube near Bayonne

- A 641 in Oeyregave; E7 / A 65 in Lescar; A 645 in Ponlat-Taillebourg

- North-East end: E80 / A 620 in Toulouse

Location
- Country: France
- Major cities: Bayonne, Pau, Tarbes, Toulouse

Highway system
- Roads in France; Autoroutes; Routes nationales

The A64 autoroute is a motorway in southwestern France. It is also called the La Pyrénéenne and numbered the European route E80. It is a toll road for part of its length.

Aligned East-West, it connects Toulouse to Bayonne via Tarbes and Pau. Its length is approximately 287 km with 2x2 lanes and 2x3 lanes towards Toulouse. It is operated by ASF.

== List of exits and junctions ==
Region	Department	Junction	Destinations	Notes
Nouvelle-Aquitaine	Pyrénées-Atlantiques	A63 - A64	Bordeaux, Bayonne - Saint-Esprit	
Nouvelle-Aquitaine	Pyrénées-Atlantiques	A63 - A64	Bayonne - Saint-Léon, Anglet, Biarritz, Saint-Sébastien, Bilbao (Spain)	
Nouvelle-Aquitaine	Pyrénées-Atlantiques	1 : Bayonne - Mousserolles	Bayonne - centre, Saint-Pierre-d'Irube, Villefranque, Centre Européen de Fret	
Nouvelle-Aquitaine	Pyrénées-Atlantiques	1.1 : Mouguerre - Bourg	Villefranque, Mouguerre	
Nouvelle-Aquitaine	Pyrénées-Atlantiques	2 : Mouguerre - Elizabery	Briscous - Les Salines, Mouguerre	
Nouvelle-Aquitaine	Pyrénées-Atlantiques	3 : Briscous	Briscous - centre, Cambo-les-Bains, Hasparren	
Nouvelle-Aquitaine	Pyrénées-Atlantiques	4 : Urt	Urt, Saint-Palais, Bidache	
Nouvelle-Aquitaine	Pyrénées-Atlantiques	5 : Guiche	Guiche	Entry and exit from Bayonne
Nouvelle-Aquitaine	Pyrénées-Atlantiques	Péage de Sames		
Nouvelle-Aquitaine	Pyrénées-Atlantiques	Aire de Hastingues		
Nouvelle-Aquitaine	Pyrénées-Atlantiques	6 : Peyrehorade ( A641 - A64)	Capbreton, Soorts-Hossegor, Saint-Vincent-de-Tyrosse, Bidache, Peyrehorade	
Nouvelle-Aquitaine	Pyrénées-Atlantiques	7 : Salies-de-Béarn	Pampelune (Spain), Saint-Jean-Pied-de-Port, Oloron-Sainte-Marie, Mauléon-Licharre, Salies-de-Béarn, Sauveterre-de-Béarn	
Nouvelle-Aquitaine	Pyrénées-Atlantiques	Aire de Haut-de-Départ (Eastbound); Aire de Magret (Westbound)		
Nouvelle-Aquitaine	Pyrénées-Atlantiques	8 : Orthez	Dax, Mont-de-Marsan, Hagetmau, Lacq, Orthez	
Nouvelle-Aquitaine	Pyrénées-Atlantiques	Aire de Lacq-Audéjos		
Nouvelle-Aquitaine	Pyrénées-Atlantiques	9 : Artix	Mourenx, Lacq, Artix	
Nouvelle-Aquitaine	Pyrénées-Atlantiques	A65 - A64	Mont-de-Marsan, Bordeaux (A62), Agen, Aire-sur-l'Adour	
Nouvelle-Aquitaine	Pyrénées-Atlantiques	E80 / A 64 becomes E7 / E80 / A 64		
Nouvelle-Aquitaine	Pyrénées-Atlantiques	9.1 : Lescar	Lescar, Pau - ouest, Saragosse, Aéroport Pau-Pyrénées	
Nouvelle-Aquitaine	Pyrénées-Atlantiques	E7 / E80 / A 64 becomes E80 / A 64		
Nouvelle-Aquitaine	Pyrénées-Atlantiques	10 : Pau - centre	Pau, Mont-de-Marsan, Aire-sur-l'Adour	
Nouvelle-Aquitaine	Pyrénées-Atlantiques	10.1 : Pau - est	Pau, Morlaàs, Saragosse	
Nouvelle-Aquitaine	Pyrénées-Atlantiques	Aire de Serres-Morlaàs		
Nouvelle-Aquitaine	Pyrénées-Atlantiques	11 : Soumoulou	Nousty, Soumoulou, Pontacq, Lourdes, Pau - est	
Nouvelle-Aquitaine	Pyrénées-Atlantiques	Aire des Pyrénées		
Occitanie	Hautes-Pyrénées	12 : Tarbes - ouest	Tarbes - centre, Lourdes, Ossun, Vic-en-Bigorre	
Occitanie	Hautes-Pyrénées	13 : Tarbes - est	Tarbes - centre, Auch, Bagnères-de-Bigorre, Séméac, Aureilhan, Rabastens-de-Bigorre, Pau, Lourdes	
Occitanie	Hautes-Pyrénées	Aire de Bordes		
Occitanie	Hautes-Pyrénées	14 : Tournay	Bagnères-de-Bigorre, Tournay	
Occitanie	Hautes-Pyrénées	15 : Capvern	Capvern, Lannemezan - est, Toulouse, Foix	
Occitanie	Hautes-Pyrénées	Aire des Bandouliers (Eastbound); Aire du Lac Saint-Martin (Westbound)		
Occitanie	Hautes-Pyrénées	16 : Lannemezan	Auch, Arreau, Lannemezan - sud	
Occitanie	Hautes-Pyrénées	Aire du Pic-du-Midi		
Occitanie	Haute-Garonne	17 : Montréjeau ( A645 - A64)	Lérida (RN 125) (Spain), Bagnères-de-Luchon, Montréjeau, Saint-Bertrand - Valcabrère	
Occitanie	Haute-Garonne	Aire du Comminges		
Occitanie	Haute-Garonne	18 : Saint-Gaudens	Boulogne-sur-Gesse, Aspet, Saint-Gaudens	
Occitanie	Haute-Garonne	Péage de Lestelle		
Occitanie	Haute-Garonne	19 : Lestelle-de-Saint-Martory	Saint-Gaudens, Lestelle-de-Saint-Martory	Entry and exit from Toulouse
Occitanie	Haute-Garonne	20 : Saint-Martory	Foix, Saint-Girons, Salies-du-Salat, Saint-Martory	
Occitanie	Haute-Garonne	21 : Boussens	Tarbes, Lourdes, Saint-Gaudens, Aurignac, Boussens, Martres-Tolosane	
Occitanie	Haute-Garonne	22 : Martres-Tolosane	Martres-Tolosane, Mondavezan	
Occitanie	Haute-Garonne	23 : Cazères	Mondavezan, Le Fousseret, Cazères	
Occitanie	Haute-Garonne	24 : Lavelanet-de-Comminges	Lavelanet-de-Comminges	
Occitanie	Haute-Garonne	25 : Saint-Élix-le-Château	Montesquieu-Volvestre, Rieux, Saint-Julien-sur-Garonne, Saint-Élix-le-Château	
Occitanie	Haute-Garonne	26 : Laffite-Vigordanne	L'Isle-en-Dodon, Peyssies, Salles-sur-Garonne, Lafitte-Vigordane, Carbonne - ouest	
Occitanie	Haute-Garonne	27 : Carbonne	Montesquieu-Volvestre, Rieux, Bérat, Carbonne - nord, Marquefave	
Occitanie	Haute-Garonne	Aire de La Garonne (Eastbound); Aire du Volvestre (Westbound)		
Occitanie	Haute-Garonne	28 : Capens	Saint-Sulpice-sur-Lèze, Longages, Marquefave, Noé - sud, Capens	
Occitanie	Haute-Garonne	29 : Noé	Noé - centre	Entry to Bayonne and exit from Toulouse
Occitanie	Haute-Garonne	30 : Longages	Noé - nord, Bérat, Longages	Entry and exit from Toulouse
Occitanie	Haute-Garonne	31 : Mauzac	Saint-Hilaire, Lavernose-Lacasse, Le Fauga, Mauzac	
Occitanie	Haute-Garonne	32 : Le Fauga	Saint-Hilaire, Lavernose-Lacasse, Le Fauga	Entry and exit from Toulouse
Occitanie	Haute-Garonne	33 : Muret - sud	Labarthe-sur-Lèze, Muret - Z. I. Sud, Lherm	
Occitanie	Haute-Garonne	34 : Lherm	Saint-Clar-de-Rivière, Lamasquère, Labastidette, Lherm, Rieumes	
Occitanie	Haute-Garonne	Péage de Muret		
Occitanie	Haute-Garonne	35 : Muret - nord	Toulouse par RD, Saint-Lys, Villeneuve-Tolosane, Roques, Seysses, Muret - centre	
Occitanie	Haute-Garonne	36 : Roques	Tarbes, Lourdes, Foix, Muret, Roques, Auterive, Labarthe-sur-Lèze	Entry and exit from Toulouse
Occitanie	Haute-Garonne	37/37a/37b : Francazal	Portet-sur-Garonne, Cugnaux, Villeneuve-Tolosane, Saint-Simon	
Occitanie	Haute-Garonne	38 : Le Chapitre	Tournefeuille, Oncopole de Toulouse, Le Mirail, La Croix de Pierre, Saint-Simon	
Occitanie	Haute-Garonne	Périphérique de Toulouse (A620) - A64	Périphérique Intérieur : Paris (A20), Bordeaux (A62), Auch, Blagnac, Toulouse - La Faourette	
Occitanie	Haute-Garonne	Périphérique de Toulouse (A620) - A64	Périphérique Extérieur : Montpellier (A61), Foix (A66), Albi (A68), Toulouse - centre, Empalot	
1.000 mi = 1.609 km; 1.000 km = 0.621 mi

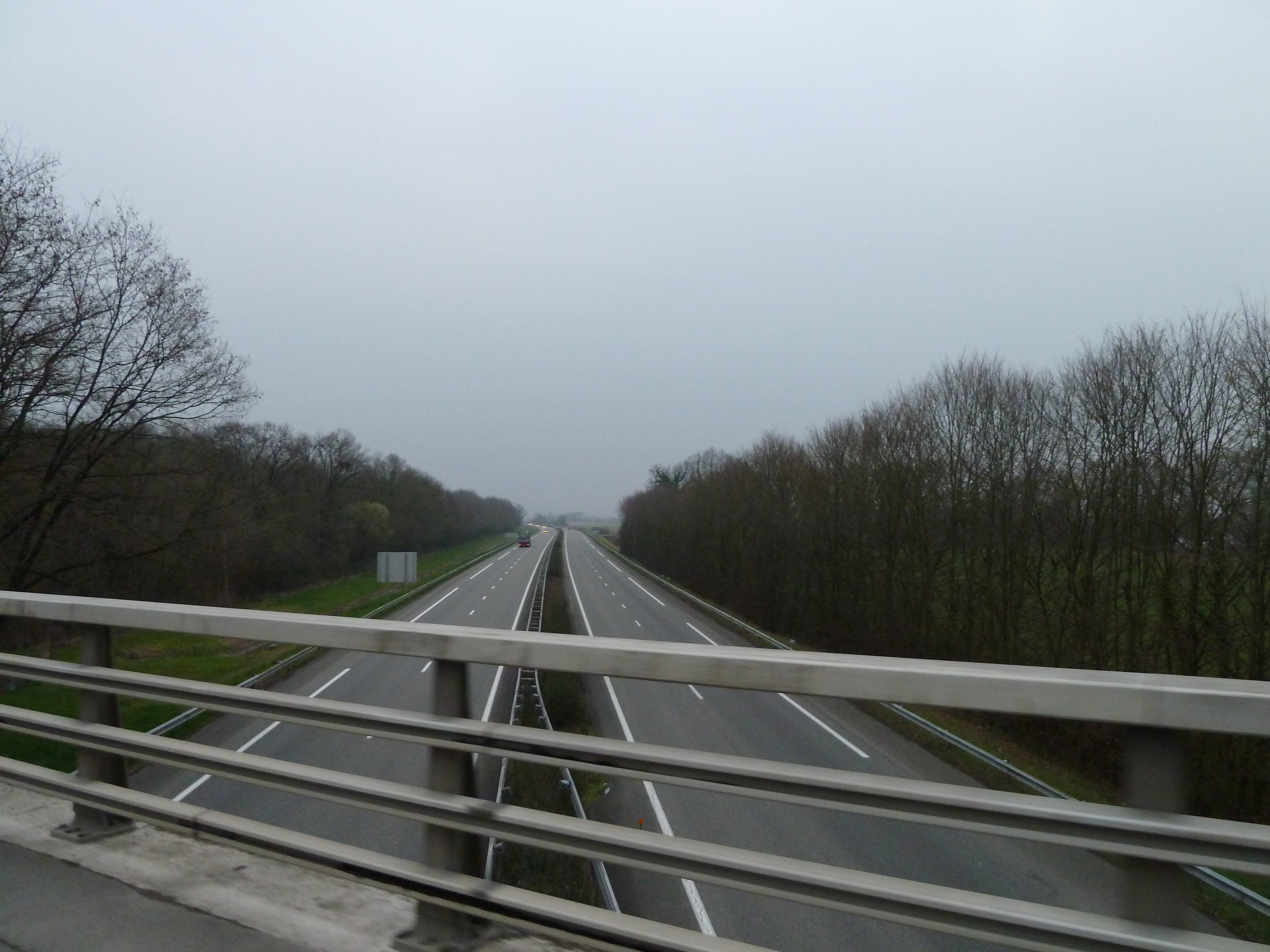
A64 autoroute is a motorway in south western France, at Pau here.

== Village étape ==
The Autoroute is served by the following Village étape, Martres-Tolosane.
