= A68 autoroute =

Road in France

A68 autoroute
- Autoroute du Pastel

Route information
- Maintained by ASF and DIR Sud-Ouest
- Length: 61.9 km (38.5 mi)
- Existed: 1992–present

Major junctions
- West end: E9 / A 61 / A 62 in Combles

- A 680 in Castelmaurou

- East end: N 88 in Marssac-sur-Tarn

Location
- Country: France

Highway system
- Roads in France; Autoroutes; Routes nationales

The A68 autoroute is a 61.9 kilometres (38.5 mi) long motorway in southern France. It connects Toulouse to Albi. It starts with a junction with the A61 and a junction with the A62. It is also known as L’autoroute du Pastel.

== Lists of Exits and junctions ==
Region	Department	Junctions	Destinations	Notes
Occitanie	Haute-Garonne	A61 & A62 (Périphérique de Toulouse) - A68	Périphérique Intérieur : Montpellier, Foix (A61), Tarbes, Lourdes (A64), Toulouse - centre	
Occitanie	Haute-Garonne	A61 & A62 (Périphérique de Toulouse) - A68	Périphérique Extérieur : Paris, Bordeaux (A62), Auch, Blagnac	
Occitanie	Haute-Garonne	1 : L'Union	L'Union, Montrabé	
Occitanie	Haute-Garonne	Péage de Toulouse - Est		
Occitanie	Haute-Garonne	A680 - A68	Castres, Mazamet, Puylaurens, Verfeil	
Occitanie	Haute-Garonne	3 : Montastruc	Toulouse par RD, Castelmaurou, Montastruc-la-Conseillère	
Occitanie	Haute-Garonne	4 : Gémil	Bessières	Entry and exit from Toulouse
Occitanie	Tarn	5 : Portes-du-Tarn	Pamiers, Belpech	
Occitanie	Tarn	5 : Portes-du-Tarn	Aire des Portes du Tarn	
Occitanie	Tarn	6 : Saint-Sulpice	Castres, Villemur-sur-Tarn, Saint-Sulpice, Lavaur	
Occitanie	Tarn	7 : Rabastens	Graulhet, Rabastens	
Occitanie	Tarn	8 : Lisle-sur-Tarn	Lisle-sur-Tarn	
Occitanie	Tarn	Aire de Sanbatan (Eastbound); Aire des Issarts (Westbound)		
Occitanie	Tarn	9 : Gaillac	Montauban, Rabastens, Graulhet, Cordes-sur-Ciel, Gaillac	
Occitanie	Tarn	10 : Cadalen	Lagrave	
Occitanie	Tarn	A 68 becomes N 88		
Occitanie	Tarn	11 : Marssac	Marssac-sur-Tarn	
Occitanie	Tarn	12 : Terssac	Terssac	
Occitanie	Tarn	13 : Zones d'Activités	Albi - Espaces Commerciaux, Zones d'Activité, Albipôle	
Occitanie	Tarn	14 : Albi - Université	Albi, Le Sequestre	
Occitanie	Tarn	15 : Castres	Castres, Graulhet	
Occitanie	Tarn	16 : Albi - centre	Albi	
Occitanie	Tarn	17 : Fréjairolles	Teillet, Fréjairolles	
Occitanie	Tarn	18 : Millau	Millau, Saint-Juéry	
Occitanie	Tarn	19 : Saint-Juéry	Saint-Juéry	
1.000 mi = 1.609 km; 1.000 km = 0.621 mi

== Village étape ==
The Autoroute has one Village étape, Brens.

== Future ==
There are proposals to extend the motorway to St Etienne via Le Puy en Velay.
