= A62 autoroute =

Road in trans-European E-road network

A62 autoroute
- Autoroute des Deux Mers

Route information
- Part of E9 / E72
- Maintained by DIR Atlantique and ASF
- Length: 231 km (144 mi)
- Existed: 1975–present

Major junctions
- North-West end: E72 / A 630 in Bordeaux

- E7 / A 65 in Langon; E9 / A 20 in Montbartier; E72 / A 620 in Toulouse

- South-East end: E9 / A 61 / A 68 in Toulouse

Location
- Country: France

Highway system
- Roads in France; Autoroutes; Routes nationales

The A62 autoroute is a French motorway forming part of the Autoroute de Deux Mers (Two Seas Motorway). The route forms the entirety of European route E 72, which is a part of the inter-European road system. The route of the A62 / E72 is between the cities of Bordeaux and Toulouse. The E72 was previously called E76 in 1975.

The road is the western portion of the Autoroute de Deux Mers connecting Toulouse (as an extension of the A61) with Bordeaux with a junction with the A630. The road is a toll road for the majority of its course (free between Bordeaux and La Brède). It is operated by ASF.

The A62 / E72 is 2x2 lanes between Bordeaux and Montauban and was widened to 2x3 lanes between Montauban and Toulouse where it also carries the north–south traffic coming from A20.

== List of junctions ==
Region	Department	Junction	Destinations	Notes
Nouvelle-Aquitaine	Gironde	A630 - RN 230 - A62	Rocade Intérieur: Mérignac, Bayonne, Bassin d'Arcachon (A63), Villenave-d'Ornon	
Nouvelle-Aquitaine	Gironde	A630 - RN 230 - A62	Rocade Extérieur : Paris (A10), Bordeaux, Lyon (A89), Bègles, Saint-Jean	
Nouvelle-Aquitaine	Gironde	1 : Saint-Médard-d'Eyrans	Cadaujac, Martillac, Saint-Médard-d'Eyrans, Léognan, Technopole Bordeaux Montesquieu	
Nouvelle-Aquitaine	Gironde	1.1 : La Brède	Tarbes, Pau, Agen, Langon, La Brède	
Nouvelle-Aquitaine	Gironde	Péage de Saint-Selve		
Nouvelle-Aquitaine	Gironde	Aire des Terres de Graves		
Nouvelle-Aquitaine	Gironde	2 : Podensac	Podensac, Cadillac	
Nouvelle-Aquitaine	Gironde	3 : Langon	Tarbes, Pau, Mont-de-Marsan, Bazas, Langon, Sauternes	
Nouvelle-Aquitaine	Gironde	A65 - A62	Pau, Mont-de-Marsan, Saragosse, Tarbes (A64)	
Nouvelle-Aquitaine	Gironde	4 : La Réole	Libourne, La Réole	
Nouvelle-Aquitaine	Gironde	Aire de Cocumont		
Nouvelle-Aquitaine	Gironde	5 : Marmande	Bergerac, Tonneins, Casteljaloux, Marmande	
Nouvelle-Aquitaine	Gironde	Aire de Mas-d'Agenais		
Nouvelle-Aquitaine	Gironde	Aire de Queyran		
Nouvelle-Aquitaine	Gironde	6 : Aiguillon	Villeneuve-sur-Lot, Mont-de-Marsan, Nérac, Tonneins, Casteljaloux, Damazan, Aiguillon	
Nouvelle-Aquitaine	Gironde	Aire de Buzet-sur-Baïse		
Nouvelle-Aquitaine	Gironde	Aire de Bruch		
Nouvelle-Aquitaine	Gironde	Aire d'Agen Porte d'Aquitaine		
Nouvelle-Aquitaine	Gironde	6.1 : Agen - ouest	Agen, Périgueux, Nérac, Parc de Loisirs - Centre Aquatique, Gare T.G.V	
Nouvelle-Aquitaine	Gironde	Aire d'Estillac		
Nouvelle-Aquitaine	Gironde	7 : Agen - centre	Villeneuve-sur-Lot, Fumel, Auch, Agen, Condom, Nérac, Lectoure, Le Passage d'Agen	
Nouvelle-Aquitaine	Gironde	Aire de Moirax (Southbound)		
Nouvelle-Aquitaine	Gironde	Aire de Layrac		
Occitanie	Tarn-et-Garonne	Aire de Dunes		
Occitanie	Tarn-et-Garonne	8 : Valence-d'Agen	Cahors, Lectoure, Valence d'Agen, Auvillar	
Occitanie	Tarn-et-Garonne	Aire de la Garonne		
Occitanie	Tarn-et-Garonne	9 : Castelsarrasin	Castelsarrasin, Moissac	
Occitanie	Tarn-et-Garonne	Aire d'Escatalens (Southbound); Aire de la Forêt de Saint-Porquier (Northbound)		
Occitanie	Tarn-et-Garonne	Aire de la Forêt de Montech (Southbound); Aire de Lacourt-Saint-Pierre (Northbound)		
Occitanie	Tarn-et-Garonne	A20 - A62	Paris, Orléans, Vierzon, Limoges, Montauban	
Occitanie	Tarn-et-Garonne	E72 / A 62 becomes E9 / E72 / A 62		
Occitanie	Tarn-et-Garonne	Aire de Naudy (Southbound); Aire de Campsas (Northbound)		
Occitanie	Haute-Garonne	Aire du Frontonnais		
Occitanie	Haute-Garonne	10.1 : Eurocentre	Grenade, Z. I. Saint-Jory - nord, Villeneuve-lès-Bouloc	
Occitanie	Haute-Garonne	11 : Saint-Jory	Fronton, Fenouillet, Saint-Alban, Saint-Jory	
Occitanie	Haute-Garonne	Péage de Toulouse - Nord		
Occitanie	Haute-Garonne	Périphérique Intérieur de Toulouse (A620) - A62	Tarbes, Lourdes (A64), Blagnac, Toulouse - centre, Auch	
Occitanie	Haute-Garonne	E9 / E72 / A 62 becomes E9 / A 62		
Occitanie	Haute-Garonne	Entry on the Toulouse ring		
Occitanie	Haute-Garonne	12 : Les Izards	Agen, Montauban, Aucamville, Villemur, Castelginest	
Occitanie	Haute-Garonne	13 : Borderouge	Toulouse - Borderouge, Launaguet	
Occitanie	Haute-Garonne	14 : Croix-Daurade	Albi, L'Union, Toulouse - Bonnefoy	
Occitanie	Haute-Garonne	A68 & A61 - A62	Castres, Albi, Lavaur	
Occitanie	Haute-Garonne	A68 & A61 - A62	Foix (A66), Montpellier, Barcelone, Toulouse - sud, La Rosaire	
E9 / A 62 becomes E9 / A 61
1.000 mi = 1.609 km; 1.000 km = 0.621 mi

== Route ==
- France
  - / E72: Toulouse Barcelone ( E9 E80) - Zaragoza
