= Rocade de Bordeaux =

Ring road

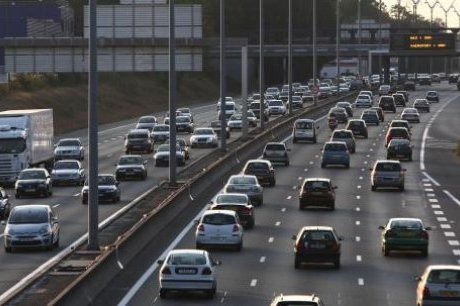
- The Rocade de Bordeaux in 2011

Route information
- Length: 45 km (28 mi)
- Existed: 1967–present

Location
- Country: France

Highway system
- Roads in France; Autoroutes; Routes nationales

The Rocade de Bordeaux is a ring road that crosses almost all the municipalities of Bordeaux Métropole and the Bordeaux urban area. It is made up of A630 autoroute, section of European routes E5 and E70, on the left bank of the Garonne (western ring road), and route nationale 230 on the right bank (east ring road). It is located in the extension of the A10 autoroute and at the intersection of the A89 (via route nationale 89), A62 and A63 autoroutes.

The term ring road was preferred to that of peripheral boulevard to avoid confusion with the boulevards surrounding the city center of Bordeaux.

Rocade de Bordeaux is monitored by the C.R.S. Aquitaine motorway based in Cenon. This police service can be reached at number 112 or at 05.56.31.79.22 for any emergency on the Bordeaux motorway sector.

== History ==
The construction of Rocade de Bordeaux was decided by Jacques Chaban-Delmas in 1958, to preserve the city center by diverting heavy traffic. It was built in sections over 27 years (from 1967 with the commissioning of the Pont d'Aquitaine, to 1993 with that of the Pont François-Mitterrand).

The ring road serves 14 municipalities in the Bordeaux area.

== Structure and layout ==
The eastern ring road, the most recent, was built from the outset in 2x3 lanes, on the other hand the western ring road, the oldest and the longest (31 km), was built in only 2x2 lanes.

Also, the western ring road is widened to 2x3 lanes with the southern section (from exit 21 to 12), 15 km built from 1997 to 2015, south-west section (from exit 12 to 10), 3 km built in November 2016, western section (from exit 10 to 9), built in September 2018, and north-west section (from exit 9 to 4), under study over 9.4 km that is planned to be converted to 2x3 lanes in 2022.

== See also ==
- Boulevard Périphérique
- Boulevards of the Marshals
- Périphérique (Caen)
- A86 autoroute
- Francilienne
