= A69 =

A69 or A-69 may refer to:

- A69 highway (France), a highway in France
- A69 road (England), a road in England
- A69 type, another name for the D'Estienne d'Orves class of French anti-submarine corvettes
- Benoni Defense, Encyclopaedia of Chess Openings code
- HLA-A69, an HLA-A serotype
- Abashiri Station, a station in Abashiri, Hokkaido, Japan, station code A69
