= A69 highway (France) =

Motorway in France

A69 autoroute

Route information
- Length: 62 km (39 mi)

Location
- Country: France

Highway system
- Roads in France; Autoroutes; Routes nationales

The A69 motorway (French: autoroute A69, pronounced [a swasɑ̃t nœf]) is a motorway intended to connect the A68 (near Toulouse) to the Castres ring road via a new 2x2 lane infrastructure between Castres and Verfeil over a length of 62 km. It corresponds to a tolled alternative built parallel to the existing RN126 on this section. Part of the motorway (the former A680 motorway has been in service since July 2025, while most of the route is still under construction. Due to ongoing litigation concerning certain administrative authorisations required for the works, their completion is uncertain and the expected opening date is unknown.

Around the beginning of the construction work, between 2022 and 2023, criticism of the project was given national media coverage, with several associations highlighting its negative environmental impact, as well as its high price for users and the fact that the current free expressways bypassing the towns of Puylaurens and Soual would be incorporated into the motorway and made toll-paying. The project received unfavourable opinions from the National Council for the Protection of Nature and the Environmental Authority. Throughout 2023 and early 2024, demonstrations were organised, bringing together up to several thousand environmental activists. On 27 February 2025, the administrative court of Toulouse annulled the environmental permits, leading to the suspension of the construction work. On 28 May, the administrative court of appeal of Toulouse, allowed the work to resume awaiting the final judgement planned for the 11 December 2025.
