= A56 autoroute =

Future road in France

Major junctions
- From: Salon-de-Provence
- To: Fos-sur-Mer

Location
- Regions: Provence-Alpes-Côte d'Azur
- Districts: Bouches-du-Rhône
- Autoroutes of France

The A56 autoroute is a French motorway that will eventually link Salon-de-Provence to Fos-sur-Mer by upgrading the RN 569 to motorway standards.

== Project ==
This project involves bringing a section of the RN 569 up to motorway standards. It will include the Miramas bypass for which public consultation has been established since 31 May to 26 June 2010.

In May 2019, the National Commission for Public Debate decided to organize a public debate on the Fos-Salon road link.
