= Pont d'Aquitaine =

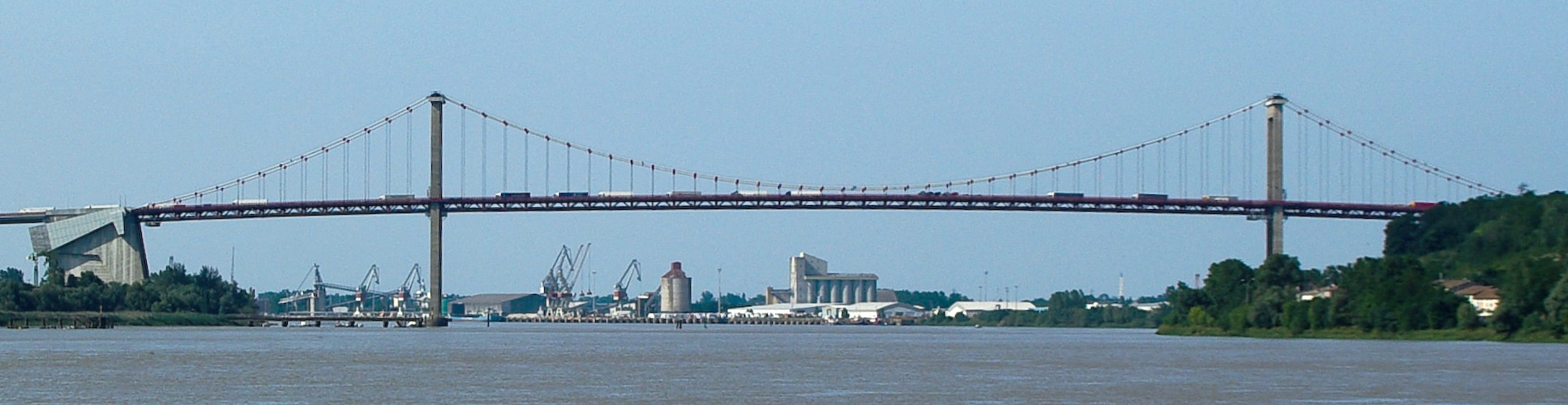
- Pont d'Aquitaine
- Coordinates: 44.879722°N 0.536944°W
- Crosses: Garonne
- Locale: Bordeaux

Characteristics
- Design: Suspension bridge
- Material: Steel
- Total length: 1,776 m (5,827 ft)
- Width: 30.9 m (101 ft)
- Height: 58 m (190 ft)
- Longest span: 394 m (1,293 ft) long

History
- Construction start: 1960
- Construction end: 1967

Location
- Interactive map of Pont d'Aquitaine

The Pont d'Aquitaine is a large suspension bridge over the Garonne, north-west of the city of Bordeaux, in France. It forms part of the ring-road of Bordeaux and carries the A630 autoroute. It was completed in 1967 and its main span is 394 m (1,293 ft) long.

The eastern and western aspects of the bridge are dramatically different. To the east there is a ridge of land which allows the roadway to enter the bridge with little or no slope. By contrast, to the west there is an area of flat land, forming part of the Medoc, which means the roadway across the bridge slopes dramatically upwards in order to gain sufficient height to enter the bridge.

== History ==
The first bridge for the city of Bordeaux, the stone bridge, built by order of Napoleon, was completed in 1822. By the Second Empire, the bridge was already considered insufficient to allow the city to develop normally. From 1891, the studies multiplied leading in 1909, to the choice of a Transporter bridge whose construction was entrusted to the Cail-Fives-Lille. The President of the Republic, Armand Fallières, laid the foundation stone on 19 September 1910.

In 1914, only the pylons were built, but Great War interrupted the works and was not resumed as that type of works was now obsolete.

The studies were resumed, and in 1939 the solution was finally found. The stone bridge would be demolished and replace it with a new, sufficiently wide bridge. This idea was confirmed by the ministerial decision of 3 December 1941. Circumstances did not allow the projects execution and the worst was thus avoided.

In 1949, the state, the city of Bordeaux and the communities concerned recognised that it was wiser to create a new bridge, but the choice of its location posed a major difficulty.

In the spring of 1953, it was decided, to increase the roadway of the stone bridge to four lanes, which could be done without notable modifications and at a low cost. The works were quickly completed in 1954. The same year, the mayor of Bordeaux, Jacques Chaban-Delmas, became Minister of Public Works and as of 13 August 1954, the decision was made in principle, to build a suspension bridge. Public Works Minister Robert Buron laid the foundation stone on 20 May 1960.

Beginning in 1961 the construction was spread over six years. The work was officially inaugurated on 6 May 1967, under the presidency of the Minister of Public Works of the time, François-Xavier Ortoli.

== Specifications ==
The Pont d'Aquitaine's central span, 393.75 m, is the second largest French suspension bridge behind the Pont de Tancarville, remains a modest work. In 2008, it ranked 80th in the world of suspension bridges. However, it is extended on the left bank by a viaduct of 1014 m, which brings it to the 8th rank in terms of length of French bridges when all categories combined.

Cross-section of the bridge.

== See also ==
- List of bridges in France
