= A61 autoroute =

French road

A61 autoroute
- Autoroute des Deux Mers

Route information
- Part of E9 / E80
- Maintained by ASF
- Length: 148 km (92 mi)
- Existed: 1978–present

Major junctions
- North-West end: E9 / A 62 / A 68 in Toulouse

- E80 / A 620 in Toulouse; E9 / A 66 in Vieillevigne

- South-East end: E15 / E80 / A 9 in Narbonne

Location
- Country: France

Highway system
- Roads in France; Autoroutes; Routes nationales

The A61 autoroute is a French motorway forming part of the Autoroute de Deux Mers. It is 148 kilometres (92 mi) long.

It connects Narbonne (and a junction on A9) and Toulouse, where it becomes the A62 towards Bordeaux. It also has junctions with the A64 towards Bayonne and A68 towards Albi on the outskirts of Toulouse. It is totally a toll road and operated by ASF. It is with 2x2 lanes on the majority of its course except for the section between Toulouse and the junction with A66 close to Villefranche-de-Lauragais which is 2x3 lanes. It is also the European route E80.

== Junction ==
| Region | Department | Junctions | Destinations | Notes |
|---|---|---|---|---|
| Occitanie | Haute-Garonne | E9 / A 62 becomes E9 / A 61 | | |
| Occitanie | Haute-Garonne | A68 & A61 - A62 | Castres, Albi, Lavaur | |
| Occitanie | Haute-Garonne | A68 & A61 - A62 | Paris, Montauban (A20), Bordeaux, Agen, Auch | |
| Occitanie | Haute-Garonne | 15 : La Roseraie | Toulouse - centre, Jolimont, Lavaur | |
| Occitanie | Haute-Garonne | 16 : Soupetard | Toulouse, Balma | |
| Occitanie | Haute-Garonne | 17 : Lasbordes | Toulouse - Cité de l'Hers, Castres par RD, Quint-Fonsegrives | |
| Occitanie | Haute-Garonne | 18 : Montaudran | Toulouse, Saint-Orens-de-Gameville, Revel | |
| Occitanie | Haute-Garonne | Périphérique Intérieur de Toulouse (A620) - A61 + 19 : Le Palays | Tarbes, Lourdes (A64), Foix, Blagnac, Toulouse - ouest, centre, Pont des Demoiselles | |
| Occitanie | Haute-Garonne | Périphérique Intérieur de Toulouse (A620) - A61 + 19 : Le Palays | Carcassonne, Labège, Castanet-Tolosan, Ramonville-Saint-Agne, Parc Technologique du Canal | |
| Occitanie | Haute-Garonne | E9 / A 61 becomes E9 / E80 / A 61 and exit from the Toulouse ring | | |
| Occitanie | Haute-Garonne | Péage de Toulouse - Sud | | |
| Occitanie | Haute-Garonne | Aire de Toulouse-Sud | | |
| Occitanie | Haute-Garonne | 19.1 : Montgiscard | Castanet-Tolosan, Escalquens, Montgiscard, Baziège, Parcs d'activités Sicoval Sud | |
| Occitanie | Haute-Garonne | Aire d’Ayguesvives (Eastbound); Aire de Baziège (Westbound) | | |
| Occitanie | Haute-Garonne | A66 - A61 | Andorre, Foix, Pamiers, Nailloux | |
| Occitanie | Haute-Garonne | E9 / E80 / A 61 becomes E80 / A 61 | | |
| Occitanie | Haute-Garonne | 20 : Villefranche-de-Lauragais | Auterive, Lavaur, Revel, Villefranche-de-Lauragais | |
| Occitanie | Haute-Garonne | Aire de Renneville (Eastbound); Aire de Villefranche-de-Lauragais (Westbound) | | |
| Occitanie | Haute-Garonne | Aire de Port-Lauragais | | |
| Occitanie | Aude | 21 : Castelnaudary | Castres, Mazères, Revel, Castelnaudary | |
| Occitanie | Aude | Aire de Mireval (Eastbound); Aire de Castelnaudary (Westbound) | | |
| Occitanie | Aude | 22 : Bram | Foix, Limoux, Mirepoix, Bram | |
| Occitanie | Aude | Aire de Montréal (Eastbound); Aire de Bram (Westbound) | | |
| Occitanie | Aude | Aire de Carcassonne-Arzens | | |
| Occitanie | Aude | 23 : Carcassonne - ouest | Mazamet, Carcassonne - centre, Z. I., Limoux | |
| Occitanie | Aude | Aire du Belvédère de la Cité (Eastbound); Aire du Belvédère d'Auriac (Westbound) | | |
| Occitanie | Aude | 24 : Carcassonne - est | Carcassonne - centre, La Cité, Trèbes | |
| Occitanie | Aude | Aire des Corbières | | |
| Occitanie | Aude | Aire de Fontcouverte (Eastbound); Aire de La Peyrière (Westbound) | | |
| Occitanie | Aude | 25 : Lézignan-Corbières | Lézignan-Corbières, Fabrezan | |
| Occitanie | Aude | Aire de Bizanet | | |
| Occitanie | Aude | Aire de Narbonne-Jonquières (Eastbound); Aire de Pech Loubat (Westbound) | | |
| Occitanie | Aude | A9 - A61 | Lyon (A7), Béziers (A75), Montpellier | |
| Occitanie | Aude | A9 - A61 | Narbonne, Barcelone, Perpignan | |
1.000 mi = 1.609 km; 1.000 km = 0.621 mi
