= European route E7 =

Road in trans-European E-road network

E7

Major junctions
- North end: Langon, France
- South end: Zaragoza, Spain

Location
- Countries: France, Spain

Highway system
- International E-road network; A Class; B Class
← E6	→ E8

European route E7 forms part of the international E-road network. It runs between Langon in France and Zaragoza in Spain (the UNECE designate the northern terminus of the E7 as Pau, but current road signage, and other entities such as Google Maps, place the northern terminus of E7 at the A62/A65 interchange near Langon).

== Route ==
=== France ===
- A 65: Langon - Mont-de-Marsan - Pau
- A 64: Pau (multiplex with E80)
- D 817: - Lescar
- D 802: Lescar - Jurançon
- N 134: Jurançon - Oloron-Sainte-Marie - France-Spain border (Urdos)

=== Spain ===
- N-330: France-Spain border (Canfranc) - Jaca
- A-23: Jaca - Sabiñánigo
- N-330: Sabiñánigo
- A-23: Sabiñánigo - Huesca - Zaragoza (end at E90)

== Gallery ==
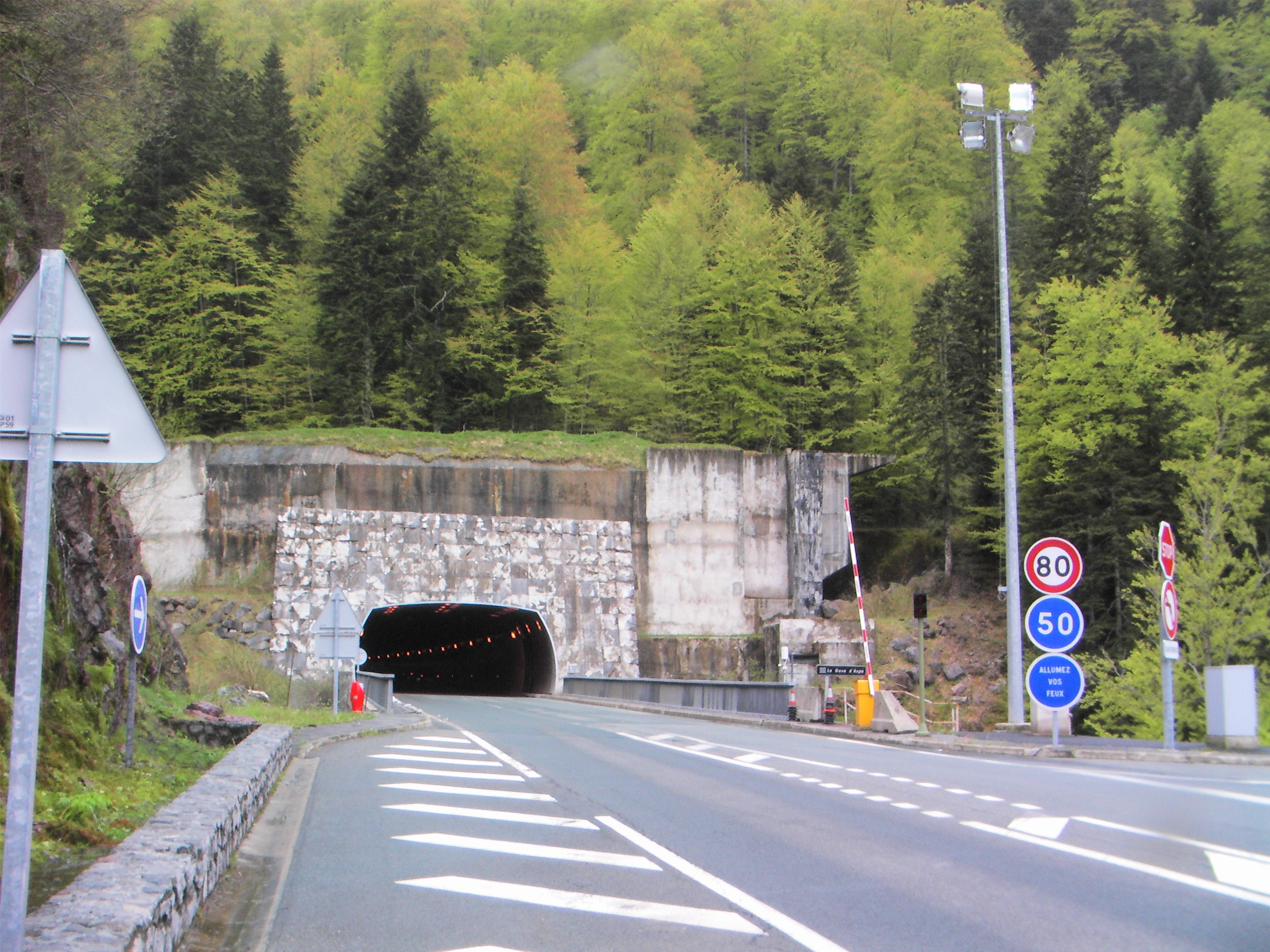
French portal of the Tunnel du Somport

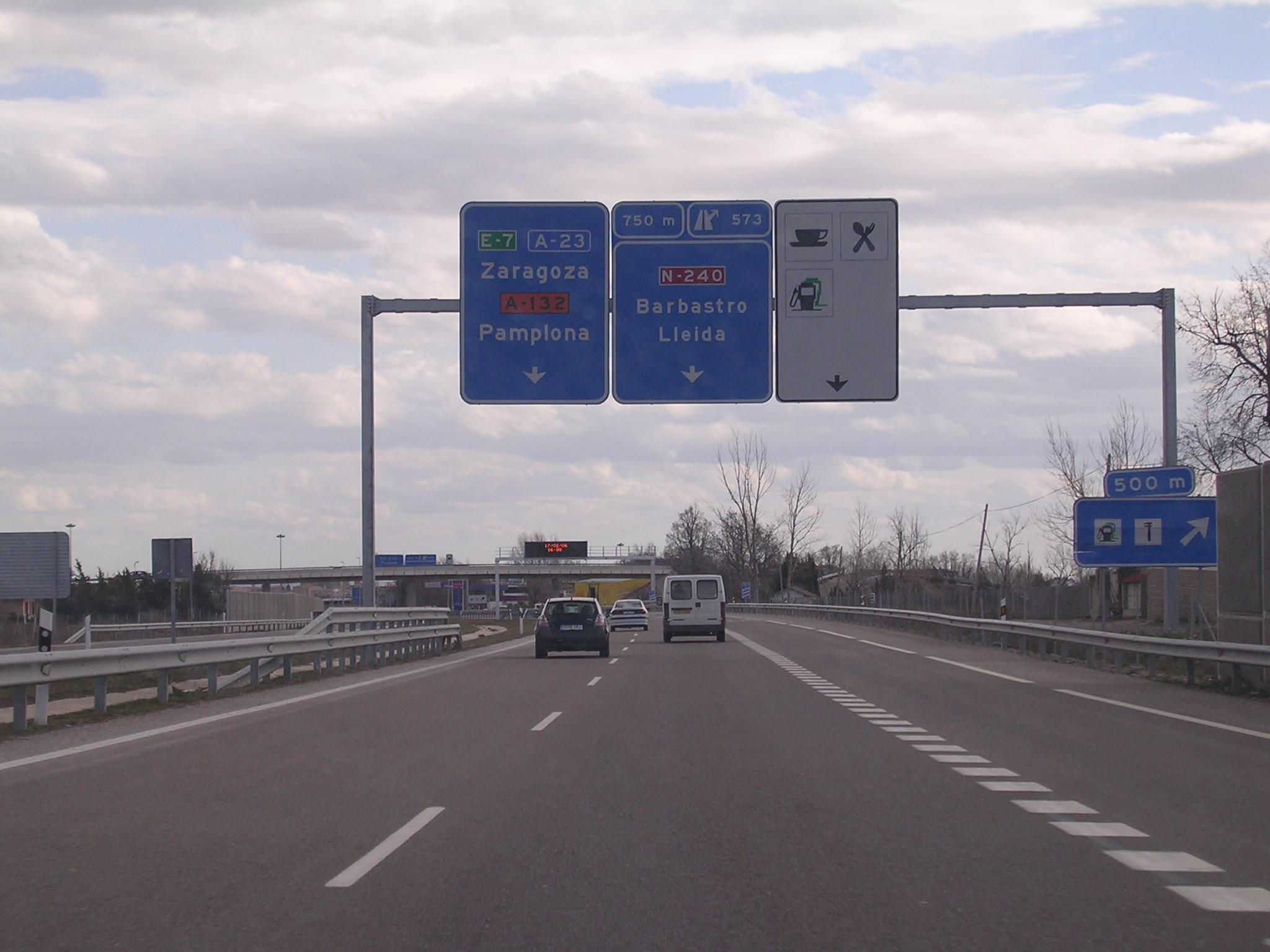
Mudejar Freeway (A-23) in Huesca, Spain
