= A66 autoroute =

Road in France

A66 autoroute
- L'Ariégeoise

Route information
- Part of E9
- Maintained by ASF
- Length: 39 km (24 mi)
- Existed: 2002–present

Major junctions
- North end: E9 / E80 / A 61 in Vieillevigne

- South end: E9 / N 20 in Pamiers

Location
- Country: France

Highway system
- Roads in France; Autoroutes; Routes nationales

The A66 autoroute is a 38.2 kilometres (23.7 mi) long motorway in the south of France, also called L'Ariégeoise.

It is in the departments of the Haute-Garonne and Ariège, and connects Villefranche-de-Lauragais with a junction to the A61 at its north and ends at the N20 at Pamiers to the south. It is operated by the company ASF, and it was finished in early 2002. It forms part of a larger European route which connects Paris, Orléans, Limoges, Toulouse, and Barcelona.

The road provides access to the Midi-Pyrénées towards the Principality of Andorra, and the junctions between Ariégeois and Toulouse.

== Lists of Exits and junctions ==
Region	Department	Junctions	Destinations	Notes
Occitanie	Haute-Garonne	A61 - A65	Toulouse	
Occitanie	Haute-Garonne	A61 - A65	Carcassonne, Montpellier, Barcelona, Perpignan	
Occitanie	Haute-Garonne	1 : Nailloux	Auterive, Montgiscard, Nailloux	
Occitanie	Ariège	Aire de Mazères (Southbound); Aire de Rosefond (Northbound)		
Occitanie	Ariège	2 : Mazères	Saverdun, Mazères, Auterive	
Occitanie	Ariège	Péage de Pamiers		
Occitanie	Ariège	3 : Pamiers - nord	Pamiers	Entry and exit from Toulouse
Occitanie	Ariège	4/4b : Z. A. de Pic	Z. A. de Pic	
Occitanie	Ariège	4a : Saverdun	Toulouse, Saverdun	Entry and exit from Pamiers
Occitanie	Ariège	E9 / A 66 becomes E9 / N 20		
Occitanie	Ariège	5 : Pamiers - centre	Pamiers, Belpech	
Occitanie	Ariège	6 : Pamiers - sud	Pamiers, Mirepoix	
Occitanie	Ariège	7 : Verniolle	Varilhes, Verniolle, Mirepoix, Carcassonne	
Occitanie	Ariège	8 : Varilhes	Varilhes	
Occitanie	Ariège	9 : Saint-Jean-de-Verges	Saint-Jean-de-Verges, Centre hospitalier	
Occitanie	Ariège	10 : Foix - nord	Foix, Saint-Jean-de-Verges, Saint-Girons, Tarbes	
Occitanie	Ariège	11 : Foix - sud	Montgailhard, Foix, Saint-Girons, Tarbes	
Occitanie	Ariège	12 : Saint-Paul-de-Jarrat	Saint-Paul-de-Jarrat, Montgailhard, Lavelanet, Perpignan	
Occitanie	Ariège	13 : Montoulieu	Montoulieu, Prayols	
Occitanie	Ariège	14 : Mercus-Garrabet	Mercus-Garrabet, Arignac, Amplaing	
1.000 mi = 1.609 km; 1.000 km = 0.621 mi

== Future ==
The N20 dual carriageway between Pamiers, Foix and Tarascon-sur-Ariège is to be upgraded to motorway standard, and renumbered the A66, however no date for this has been announced.
