= A32 autoroute =

Former road in France

The A32 autoroute was a proposed road project to improve the A31 autoroute between the frontier with Luxembourg and the town of Toul in north eastern France. It was abandoned in July 2010.

== Public Debate ==
This project became victim of the new public opinion to road building in Europe. The road was proposed to relieve congestion on the A31 between the border and Nancy. This is one of the busiest on the French motorway network with (more than 100.000 vehicles/days between Thionville and Metz).

The upgrade had been planned since 1990, however while the existing road is toll free the A32 would have been a toll motorway. The plans involved considerable impact on the environment including large cuttings through the Moselle valley. The majority of the land had been bought or reserved.
