= Belpech =

Commune in Occitanie, France

- Commune
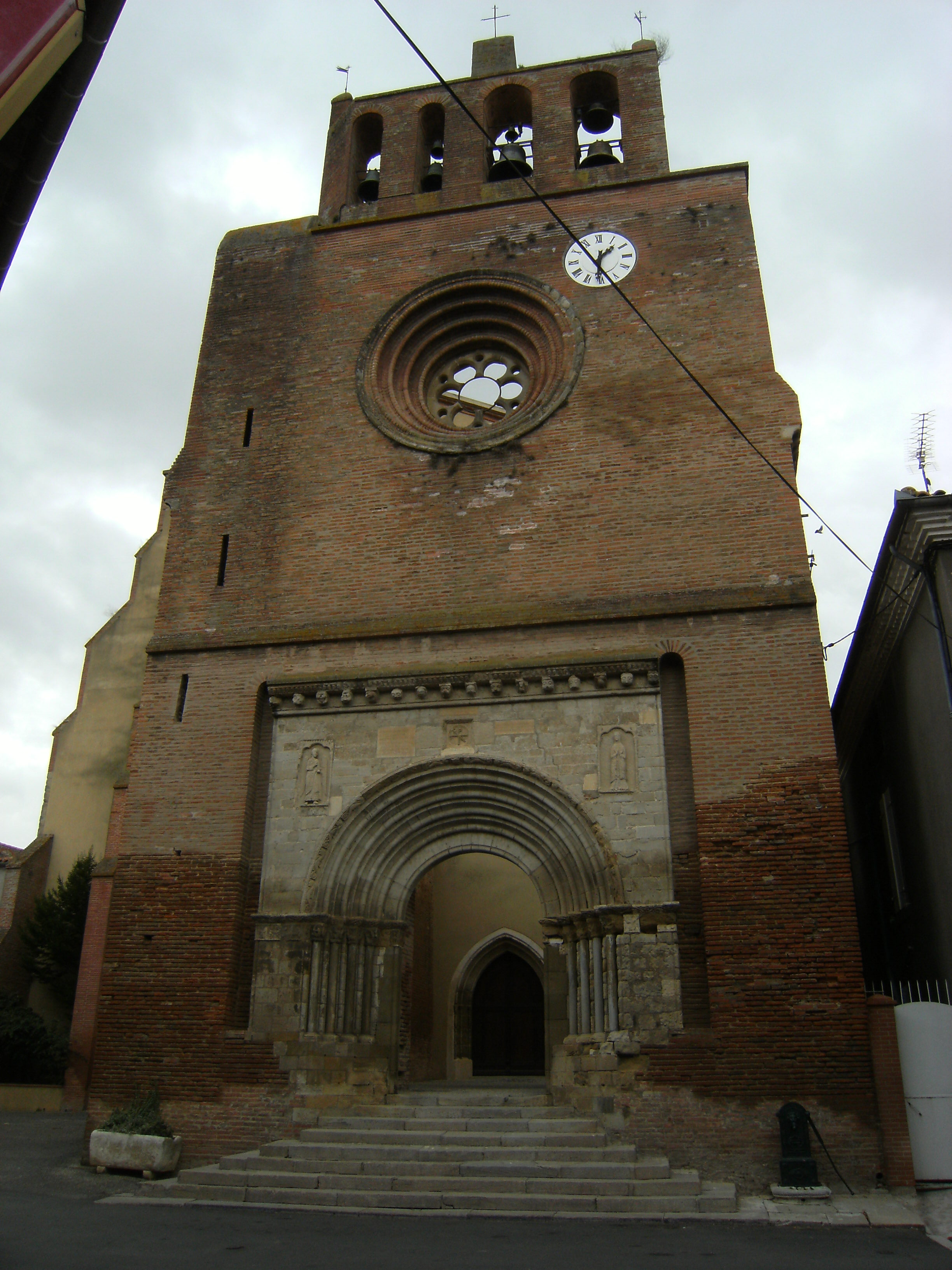
- Facade of St. Saturnin

- Coat of arms
- Location of Belpech
- Location within France Location within Occitanie
- Coordinates: 43°12′N 1°45′E
- Country: France
- Region: Occitania
- Department: Aude
- Arrondissement: Carcassonne
- Canton: La Piège au Razès

Government
  - Mayor (2023–2026): Estelle Vilespy
- Area^{1}: 42.46 km^{2} (16.39 sq mi)
- Elevation: 243 m (797 ft)
- Highest elevation: 371 m (1,217 ft)
- Lowest elevation: 228 m (748 ft)
- Population (2023): 1,343
  - Density: 31.63/km^{2} (81.92/sq mi)
- Time zone: UTC+01:00 (CET)
  - Summer (DST): UTC+02:00 (CEST)
- INSEE/Postal code: 11033 /11420
- ^{1} French Land Register data, which excludes lakes, ponds, glaciers > 1 km^{2} (0.386 sq mi or 247 acres) and river estuaries.

Belpech (French pronunciation: [bɛlpɛʃ]; Occitan: Bèlpuèg) is a commune in the Aude department in southern France.

== Geography ==
Belpech is a town of 1300 inhabitants built at 245 meters above sea level; old medieval Bastide located at the foot of a sunny slope of Lauragais, just upstream from the confluence of the Vixiège (which runs through the village) and the Hers, which is a tributary.

== History ==
The origin of Belpech is very old, the site was inhabited from the Gallo-Roman times. The name of the village at this time (Bellopodio-Beaupuy) derives from that of a Gaulish god: Belenos and "pech" means the hill which dominates. It was once a very important city that had to suffer religious wars and large fires (97 houses were burned down in 1791). It was dominated by a castle called Castelas, built in the eleventh century on the hill "pech" overlooking the present village, which you can still see the remains of the keep.

The Monastery of Our Lady of Garnac (Garnicia), founded in the fourteenth century was located south of the castle, a few remnants of these walls and the church are still visible. The Lordship of Belpech belonged: in the eleventh century, Bertrand de Beaupuy; the thirteenth century, in Fort-de Beaupuy Raimond, in the fourteenth century to Galcerandum of Bellopodio; in the early fifteenth century, Sicard Bellopodio; in 1470 to Sir Etienne de Rouaix.

In 1226, Louis XIII stopped at Belpech.

In 1630, the plague broke out in the village, the inhabitants took refuge in the fields and built shacks in which they retired. The plague broke out again in August 1654 and lasted until the following November.

In 1835, was known for its sheets factories.

== Sights ==
The "Castella": Medieval Castle • The Gallic site of Garnac. • The Gallo-Roman Bridge. • The original Castle (10th) in ruins. • Hall-style metal Baltard. • Half-timbered houses with a dual cantilever (14th). • The house of Cardinal Curtis (14th) with its Gothic windows in two bays, located Tournefeuille street. • The home of the Marquis de Mauleon Seigneurale-Barousse (17th). • The church of Saint-Saturnin which dates from the early fourteenth century, replaced an older Romanesque building. There are, inside, a nice set of disc-shaped steles. The jewel is the famous Romanesque portal, the most complete and most beautiful of Lauragais. It is a "portal Toulouse" without eardrum but with multiple arches, corresponding to projections of splays and columns housed in the projections • The Ruins of the Chapel of the Rosary (15th) located above the village near the castle. • The Church of St. John Baptist de Tresmèzes. • Several iron crosses (15ème/16ème/18ème), many stone crosses (roadsides, and in the cemetery's church), also near the hamlet of Tresmèzes a cross from 1652.

== Population ==
Historical population
Year	Pop.	±% p.a.
1968	1,224	—
1975	1,089	−1.66%
1982	1,068	−0.28%
1990	1,165	+1.09%
1999	1,152	−0.12%
2007	1,280	+1.33%
2012	1,332	+0.80%
2017	1,273	−0.90%
2023	1,343	+0.90%
Source: INSEE

== See also ==
- Communes of the Aude department
