= Périphérique de Toulouse =

Ring road

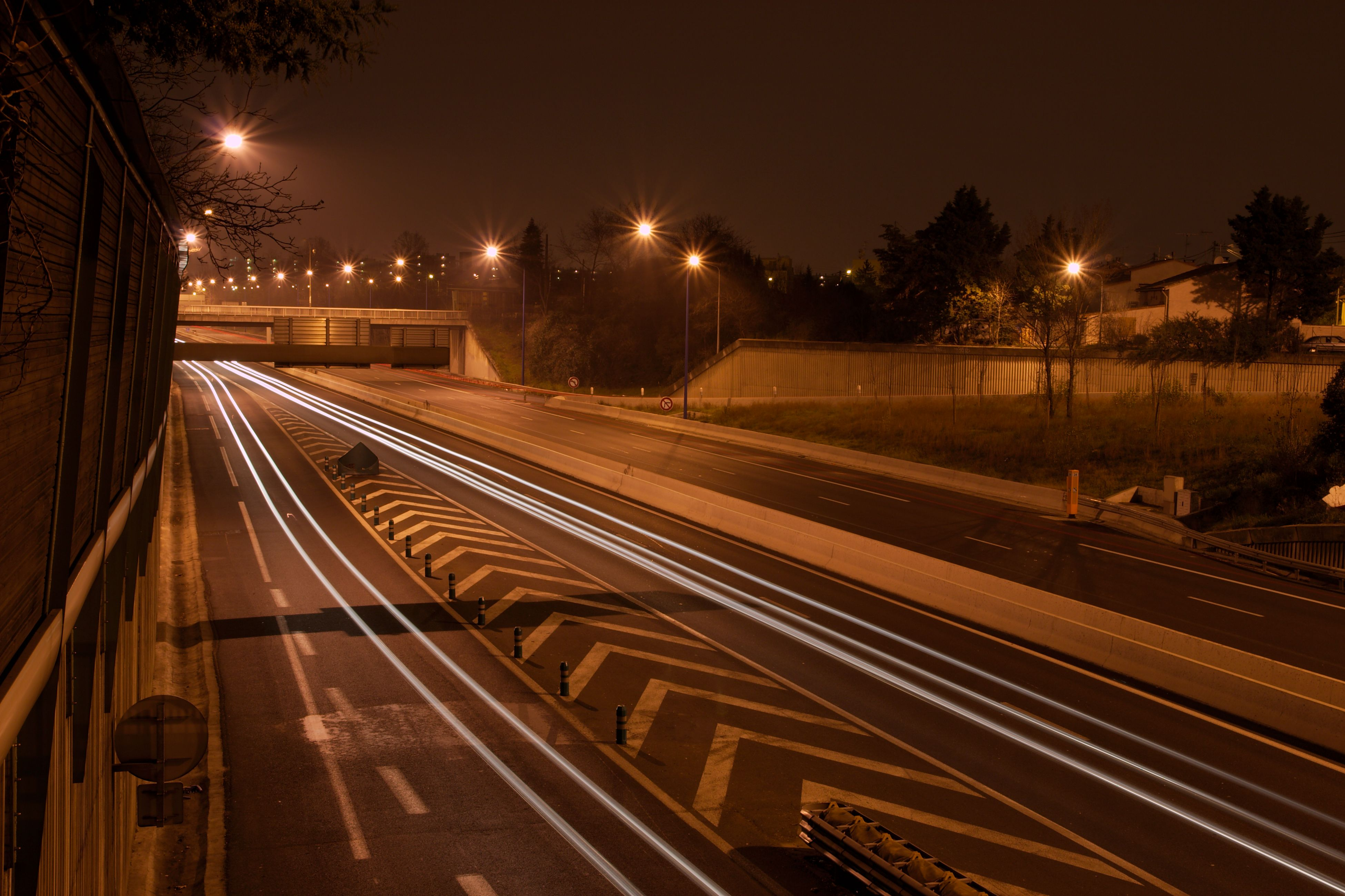
- The Périphérique de Toulouse in 2007

Route information
- Length: 35 km (22 mi)

Location
- Country: France

Highway system
- Roads in France; Autoroutes; Routes nationales

The Périphérique de Toulouse is a ring road consisting of urban expressways, entirely 2 × 3 lanes in the city of Toulouse. From the point of view of its name, it is made up of two branches linking the A61 and the A62 autoroute, one passing to the south and west of the city (A620, old western ring road), the other passing to the east (A62-A61, former eastern ring road). These two branches are connected by straps allowing continuity of circulation.

The inner ring (on which the center of Toulouse is on the right when driving) is called the inner ring road. The outer ring (on which the city's suburbs are on the right while driving) is called the outer ring road. It is therefore no longer the branch (east or west) that defines the nature of the ring road but the direction of traffic. For signaling purposes, a specific logo has been created for the signaling of the exits allowing entry to the ring road: it refers to the directions of traffic (outer or inner ring road).

On the entire ring road, the speed is limited to 90 km/h (56 mph) for cars and 80 km/h (50 mph) for trucks over 3.5t. The junctions between the various bypasses making up the ring road may have lower speeds.

== History ==
Initially limited to 110 km/h and 90 km/h respectively, the vehicles first had to reduce their speed by 20 km/h during the summer of 2006: the metropolis and the prefecture, together with the air observatory in Midi-Pyrénées, had set up a speed limit to reduce emissions of exhaust gases and polluting particles produced by vehicles. Renewed for the summer of 2007, this decision was finally made permanent on 4 October 2007.
