= A630 autoroute =

Road in France

A630: Bordeaux Ring Road

The A630 autoroute is a motorway in south west France. It is the bypass for Bordeaux, also called Rocade, and forms part of the European routes E5 E70.

It has 2 lanes each way and currently is being widened to 3 lanes. The construction of the bypass was started in 1972 and completed in 1983, however works on the Bridge of Aquitaine started in 1961. It was completed in 1993 with the opening of the section between the François Mitterrand Bridge and the RD936. It is 33.7 km (20.9 mi) long and toll free.

== Junctions ==
Listed counter-clockwise:

- Interchange N230-A10-A630 Junction with A10 to Paris, Poitiers and N230.
- 01 (Cenon-Artigues) Areas served: Cenon, Artigues
- 02 (Bordeaux-Bastides) Areas served: Lormont, Port et ZI d'Ambès, ZI Bec d'Ambès, Carbon-Blanc, Bassens
- 03 (Vieux Lormont) Closed
  - Pont d'Aquitaine
  - Speed Radar (Limit: 70 km/h)
- 04 (Bordeaux-Centre) Areas served: Parc des expositions, Bordeaux-Lac, ZI Blanquefort, Bordeaux-North, Bordeaux City Centre, Bruges-Le Tasta
- 05 (Bordeaux-Fret) Areas served: Bordeaux-Fret, ZI Bruges
- 06 (Bruges) Areas served: Bruges, Blanquefort, ZI Campilleau
- 07 (Eysines-Le Vigean) Areas served: Le Taillan-Médoc, Le Bouscat, Eysines-Le Vigean, Médoc
- 08 (Le Verdon) Areas served: Lacanau, Eysines, St Médard en J., Le Verdon
- 09 (Le Haillan) Areas served: Bordeaux-Caudéran, Mérignac-Capeyron, St Médard en J., Le Haillan
- 10 (Mérignac-Centre) Areas served: Andernos, Cap-Ferret, Mérignac-Pichey/Centre
  - Speed Radar (Limit 90 km/h)
- 11a (Parc d'activités) Areas served: Centre Hôtelier, Parc d'activités
- 11b (Aéroport) Areas served Bordeaux Airport, Mérignac, Mérignac-Chemin Long
- 12 (St-Jean) Areas served: Saint-Jean-d'Illac, Parc Cimetière
- 13 (Pessac-Centre) Towns served: Pessac-L'Alouette
- 14 (Pessac-Saige) Towns served: ZI Pessac, Hôpitaux Haut-Lêveque Xavier Arzonan
- Interchange A630-A63 Junction with the A63 to Arcachon, Mont-de-Marsan, Bayonne, San Sebastián, Canéjan, Cestas, Spain
- 16 (Gradignan-Centre) Towns served: Gradignan, Talence, Domaine Universitaire
- 17 (Talence) Areas served: Talence, Thouars, Gradignan, Malartic
- 18a (Léognan) Areas served: Cadaujac, Villenave-d'Ornon, Pont de la Maye
- 18b (Villenave) Areas served: Villenave-Centre, Pont de La Maye
- Interchange A630-A62 Junction with A62 to Toulouse, Pau, Agen
- 20 (Bègles) Areas served: Cadaujac, Bègles
  - Speed Radar (Limit 90 km/h)
- 21 (Bordeaux-Centre) Areas served: City Centre, St Jean Railway Station, A631 spur to docks and City Centre.
- Road becomes the RN230 over the Pont François Mitterrand (Pont d'Arcins)
- 22 (Latresne-Floirac-La Souys)
- 23 (Bouillac) Areas served: Floirac-Centre, Bouillac
- 24 (Bergerac) Areas served: Bergerac, Tresses, Haut-Floirac
- 25 (Artigues) Areas served: Artigues-Centre, Cenon, ZI Artigues
- 26 (Libourne) Areas served: N89, Libourne, Périgueux, Yvrac
- 27 (Lormont) Areas served: Lormont, Carbon-Blanc
- Interchange N230-A10-A630 Junction with A10 to Paris, Poitiers and A630.
