= Ponlat-Taillebourg =

- Commune
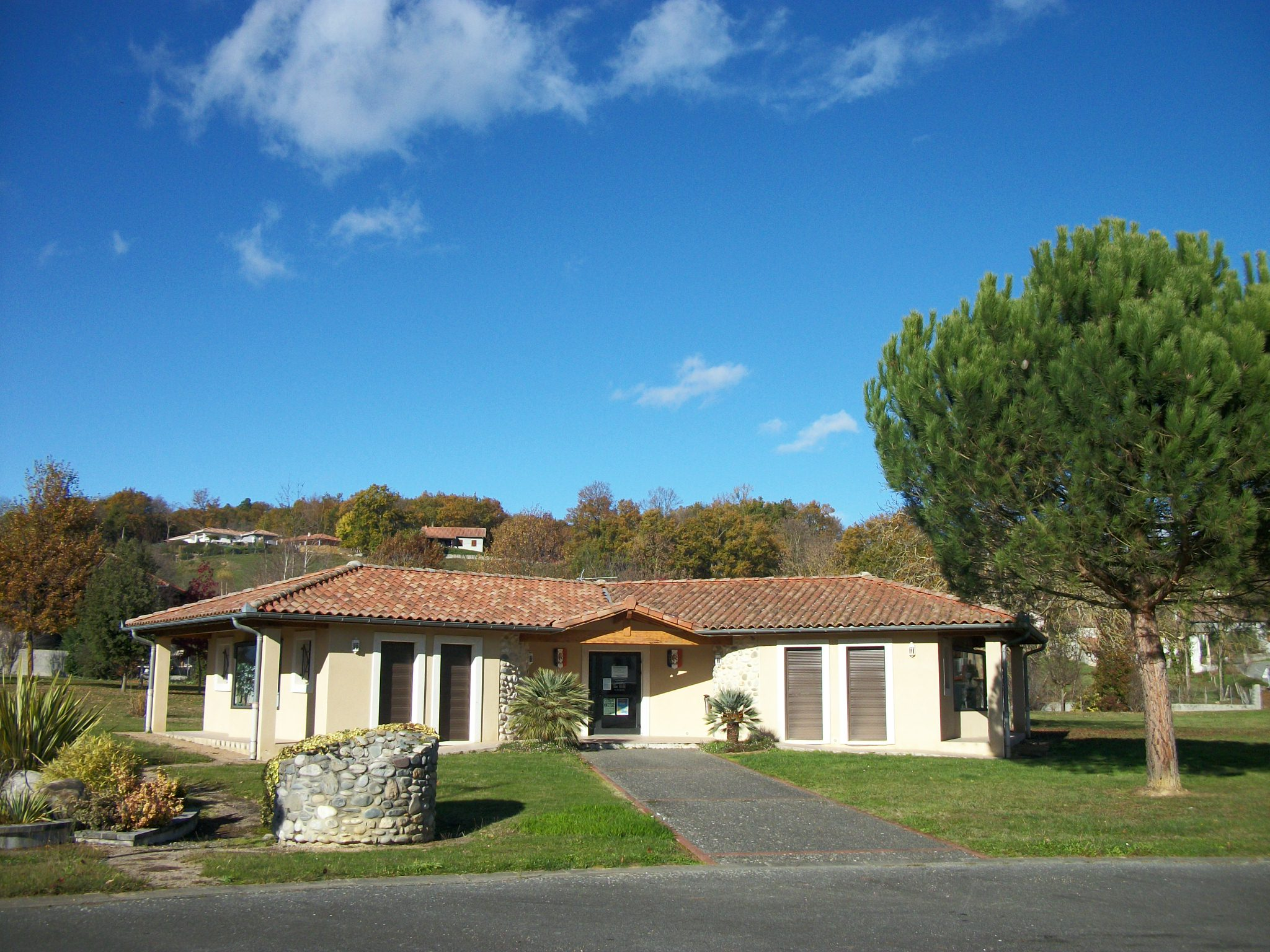
- The town hall in Ponlat-Taillebourg
- Location of Ponlat-Taillebourg
- Location within France Location within Occitanie
- Coordinates: 43°06′45″N 0°36′02″E
- Country: France
- Region: Occitania
- Department: Haute-Garonne
- Arrondissement: Saint-Gaudens
- Canton: Saint-Gaudens

Government
  - Mayor (2020–2026): Gilles Fourties
- Area^{1}: 8.6 km^{2} (3.3 sq mi)
- Elevation: 410 m (1,350 ft)
- Highest elevation: 528 m (1,732 ft)
- Lowest elevation: 395 m (1,296 ft)
- Population (2023): 633
  - Density: 74/km^{2} (190/sq mi)
- Time zone: UTC+01:00 (CET)
  - Summer (DST): UTC+02:00 (CEST)
- INSEE/Postal code: 31430 /31210
- ^{1} French Land Register data, which excludes lakes, ponds, glaciers > 1 km^{2} (0.386 sq mi or 247 acres) and river estuaries.

Ponlat-Taillebourg (French pronunciation: [pɔ̃la tajbuʁ]; Occitan: Pontlat e Talhaborg) is a commune in the Haute-Garonne department in southwestern France.

== Population ==
Historical population
Year	Pop.	±% p.a.
1968	357	—
1975	381	+0.93%
1982	383	+0.07%
1990	461	+2.34%
1999	457	−0.10%
2007	570	+2.80%
2012	581	+0.38%
2017	619	+1.28%
2023	633	+0.37%
Source: INSEE

== See also ==
- Communes of the Haute-Garonne department
