= Verfeil, Haute-Garonne =

Verfeil
- Commune
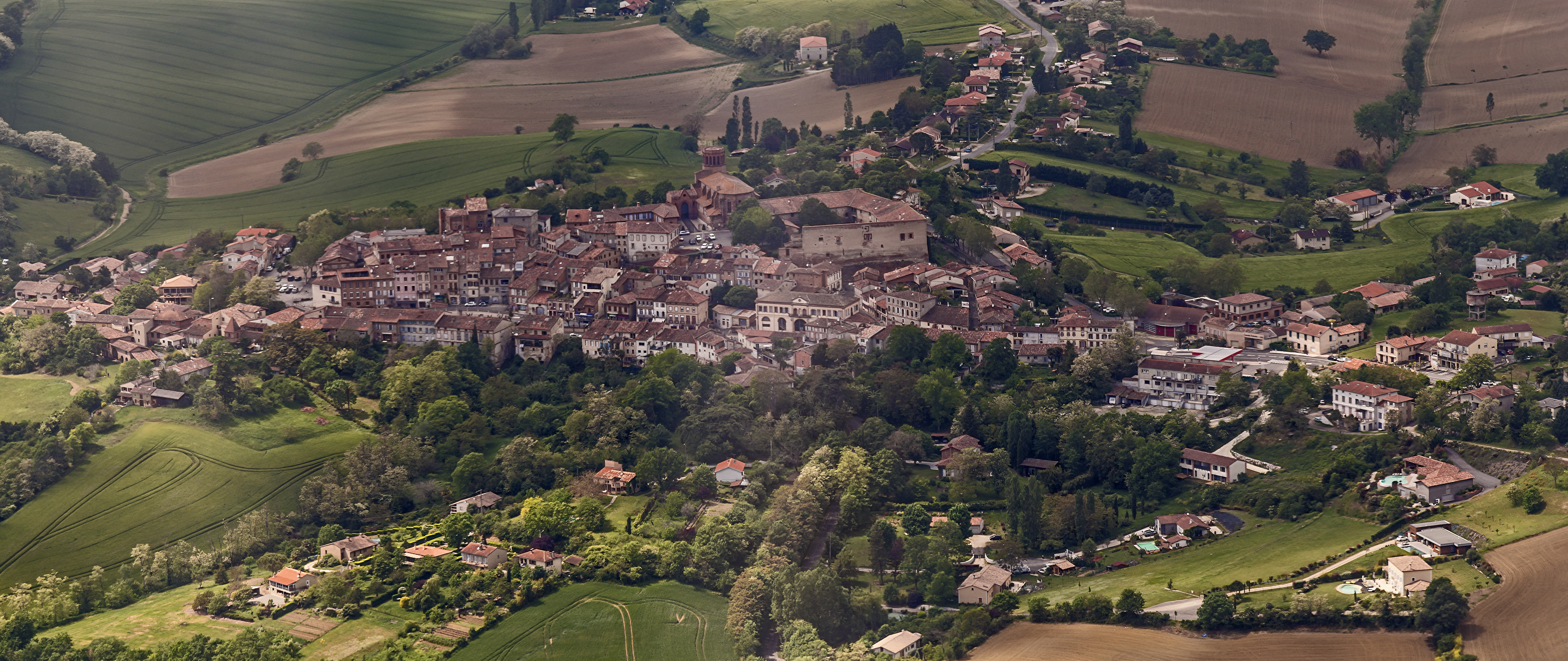
- An aerial view of Verfeil

- Coat of arms
- Location of Verfeil
- Location within France Location within Occitanie
- Coordinates: 43°39′30″N 1°39′42″E
- Country: France
- Region: Occitania
- Department: Haute-Garonne
- Arrondissement: Toulouse
- Canton: Pechbonnieu
- Intercommunality: Coteaux du Girou

Government
  - Mayor (2020–2026): Patrick Plicque
- Area^{1}: 41.23 km^{2} (15.92 sq mi)
- Elevation: 225 m (738 ft)
- Highest elevation: 273 m (896 ft)
- Lowest elevation: 146 m (479 ft)
- Population (2023): 3,954
  - Density: 95.90/km^{2} (248.4/sq mi)
- Time zone: UTC+01:00 (CET)
  - Summer (DST): UTC+02:00 (CEST)
- INSEE/Postal code: 31573 /31590
- ^{1} French Land Register data, which excludes lakes, ponds, glaciers > 1 km^{2} (0.386 sq mi or 247 acres) and river estuaries.

Verfeil (French pronunciation: [vɛʁfɛj]; Occitan: Vrudfuèlh) is a commune in the Haute-Garonne department in southwestern France.

== History ==
It was an important centre of Catharism from about 1140 to the mid 13th century. Bernard of Clairvaux preached against heresy at Verfeil in 1145. Sent away without a proper hearing by the seigneurs, he is said to have cursed the town with the words Viridefolium, desiccet te Deus! ("Verfeil, may God dry you up!") Izarn Neblat, one of those seigneurs, was said by Guillaume de Puylaurens to have lived in his old age in poverty at Toulouse as a result of this curse; the town's recovery was dated by the faithful to the period of the Albigensian Crusade, when Simon de Montfort, 5th Earl of Leicester gave it to bishop Foulques de Toulouse.

An important Catholic-Cathar debate was held at Verfeil in 1206. The Catholic side was led by Diego de Acebo, bishop of Osma, supported by the future Saint Dominic; among the Cathars were Pons Jourda and Arnaud Arrufat.

In the following 800 years, the history of this rural village was notable in the French Revolution of 1789 and in the Second World War, in 1940-1945.

== Population ==
Historical population

Year	Pop.	±% p.a.
1793	2,040	—
1800	2,258	+1.46%
1806	2,490	+1.64%
1821	2,399	−0.25%
1831	2,538	+0.56%
1836	2,460	−0.62%
1841	2,420	−0.33%
1846	2,339	−0.68%
1851	2,347	+0.07%
1856	2,367	+0.17%
1861	2,372	+0.04%
1866	2,350	−0.19%
1872	2,342	−0.06%
1876	2,171	−1.88%
1881	2,070	−0.95%
1886	2,043	−0.26%
1891	1,908	−1.36%
1896	1,894	−0.15%
1901	1,827	−0.72%

Year	Pop.	±% p.a.
1906	1,684	−1.62%
1911	1,663	−0.25%
1921	1,418	−1.58%
1926	1,476	+0.80%
1931	1,395	−1.12%
1936	1,402	+0.10%
1946	1,477	+0.52%
1954	1,529	+0.43%
1962	1,536	+0.06%
1968	1,540	+0.04%
1975	1,734	+1.71%
1982	2,000	+2.06%
1990	2,265	+1.57%
1999	2,504	+1.12%
2007	2,969	+2.15%
2012	3,312	+2.21%
2017	3,595	+1.65%
2023	3,954	+1.60%

Source: EHESS and INSEE (1968-2023)

== Monuments ==
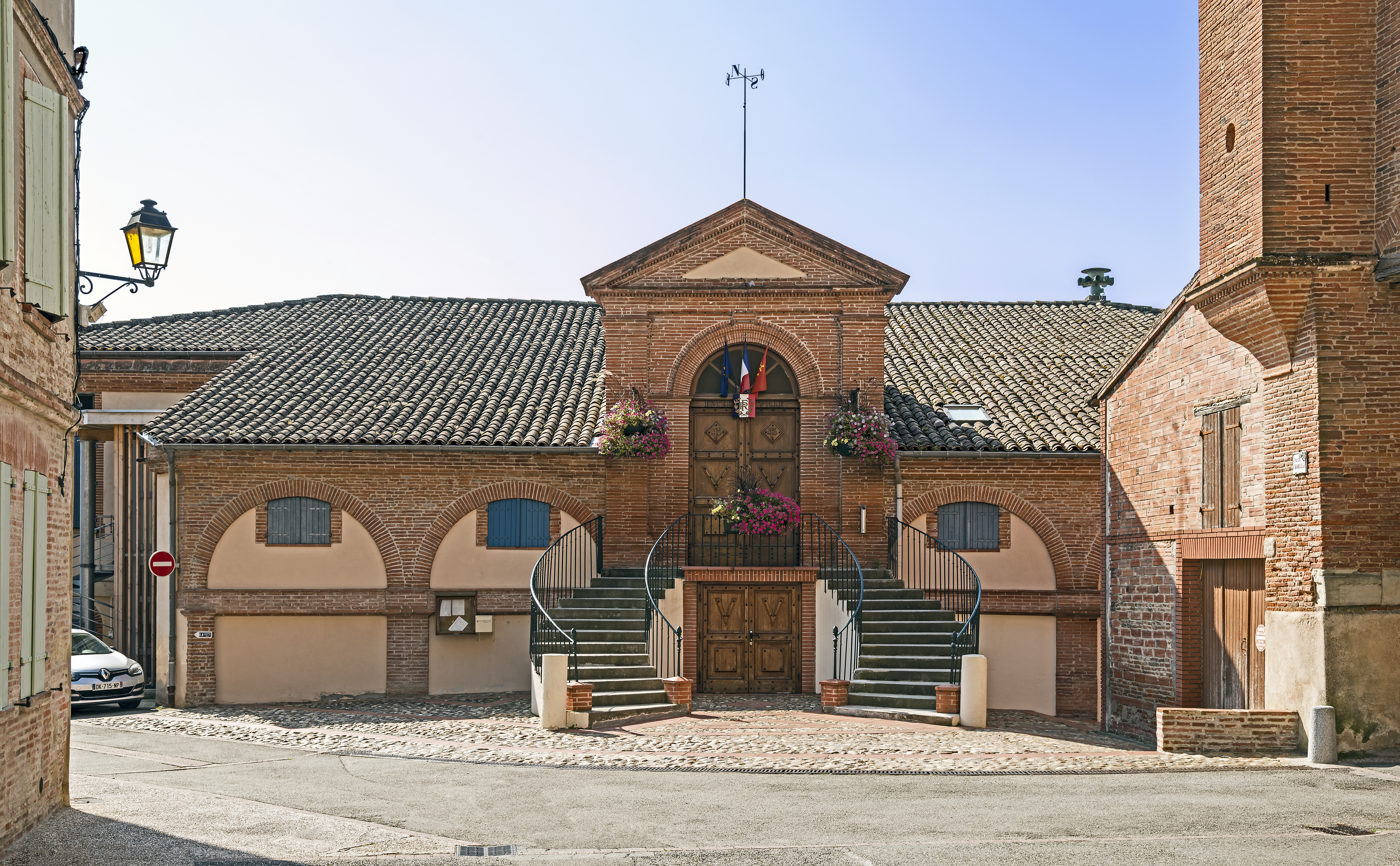
The town hall

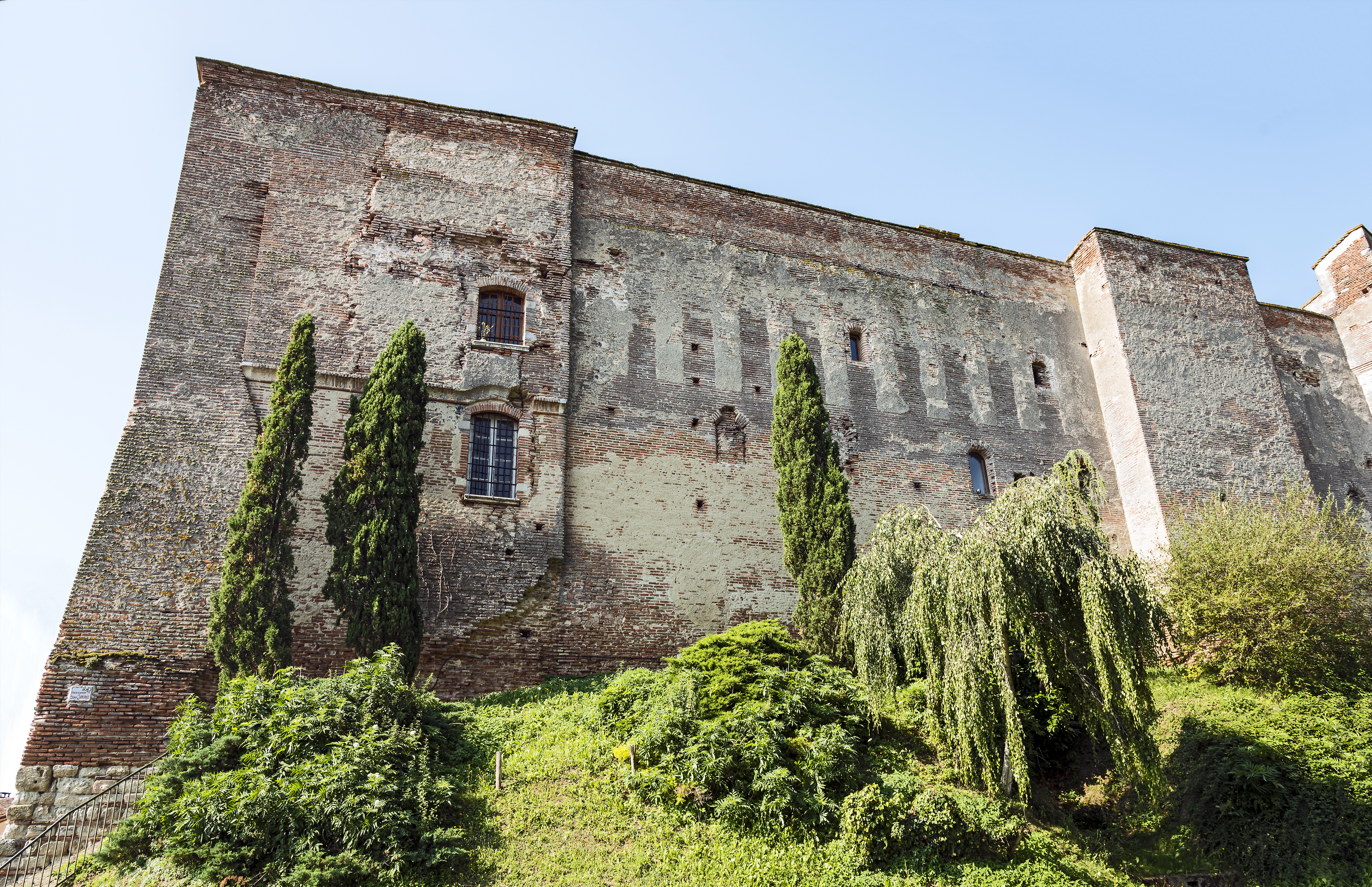
The castle

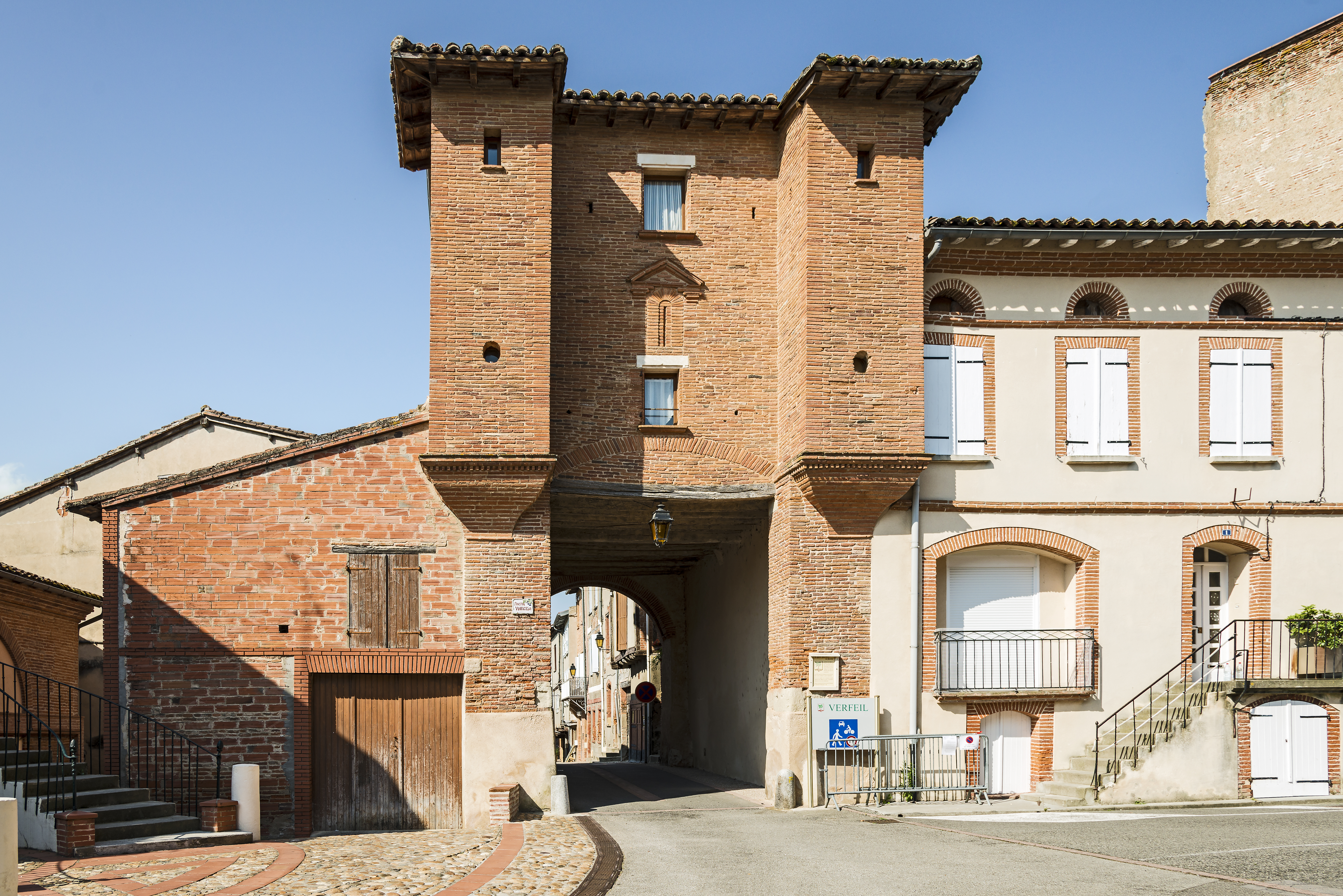
The Vaureze's Gate

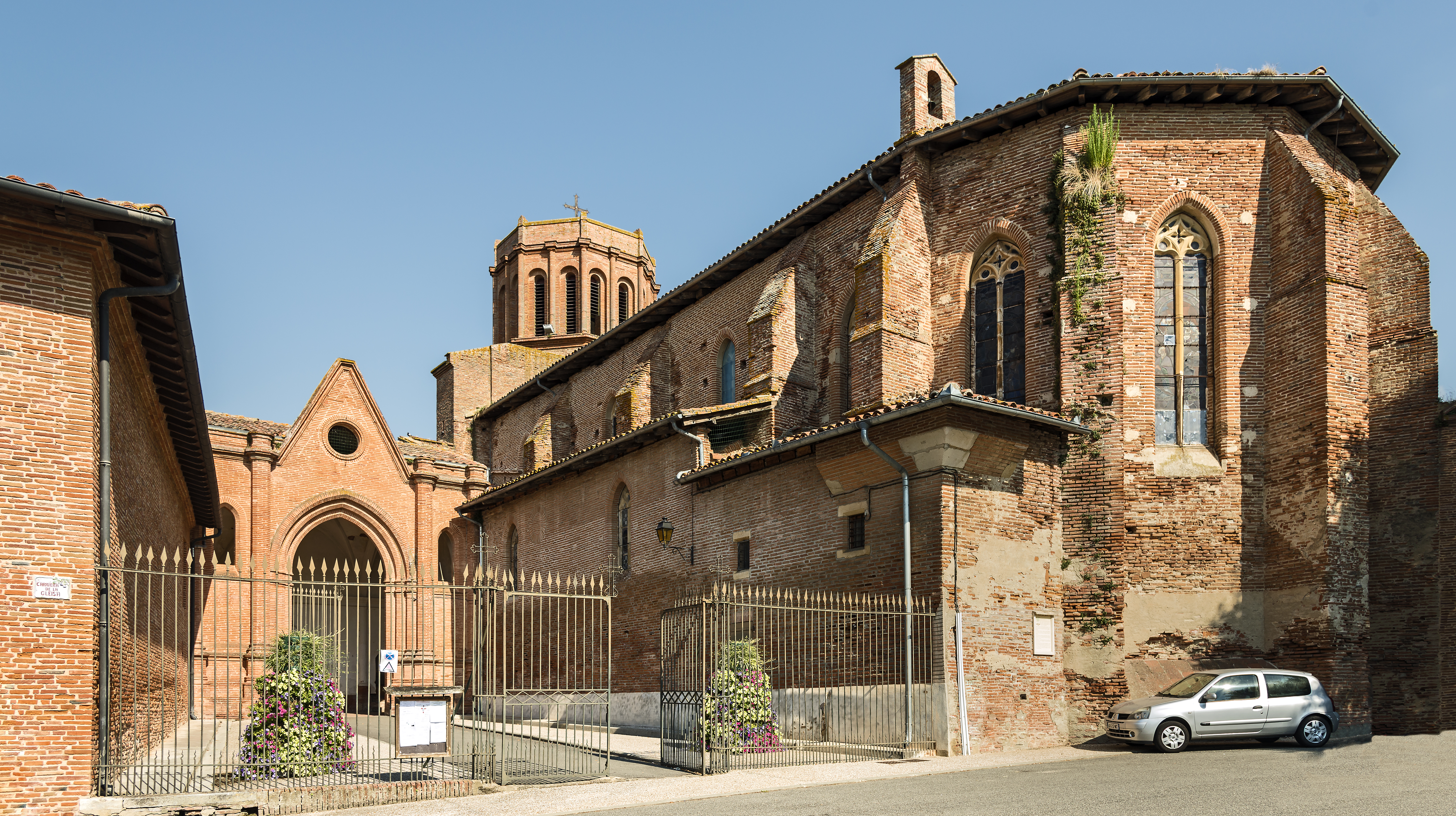
The church "Saint Blaise"

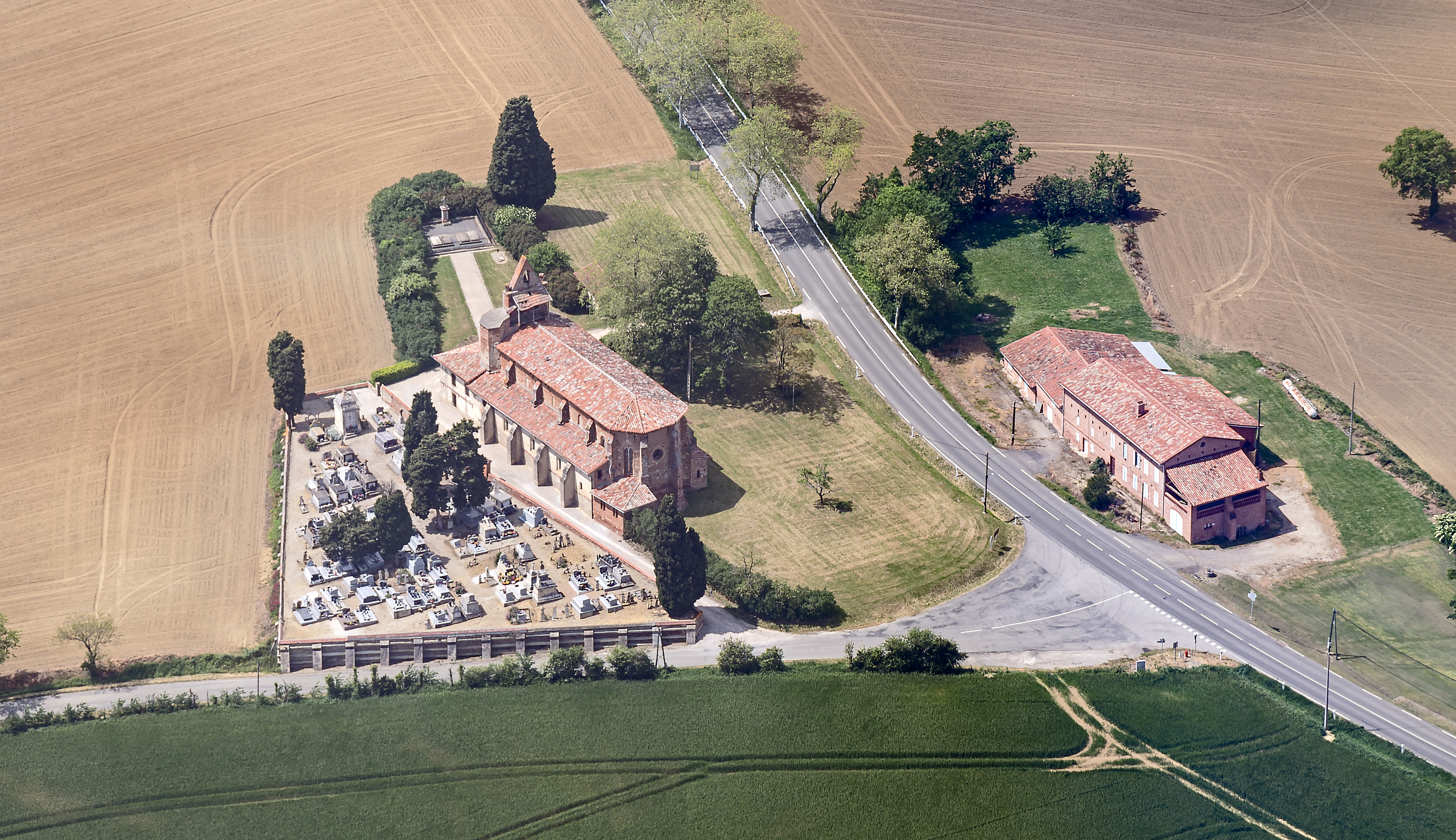
The church "Saint-Sernin-of-Rais"

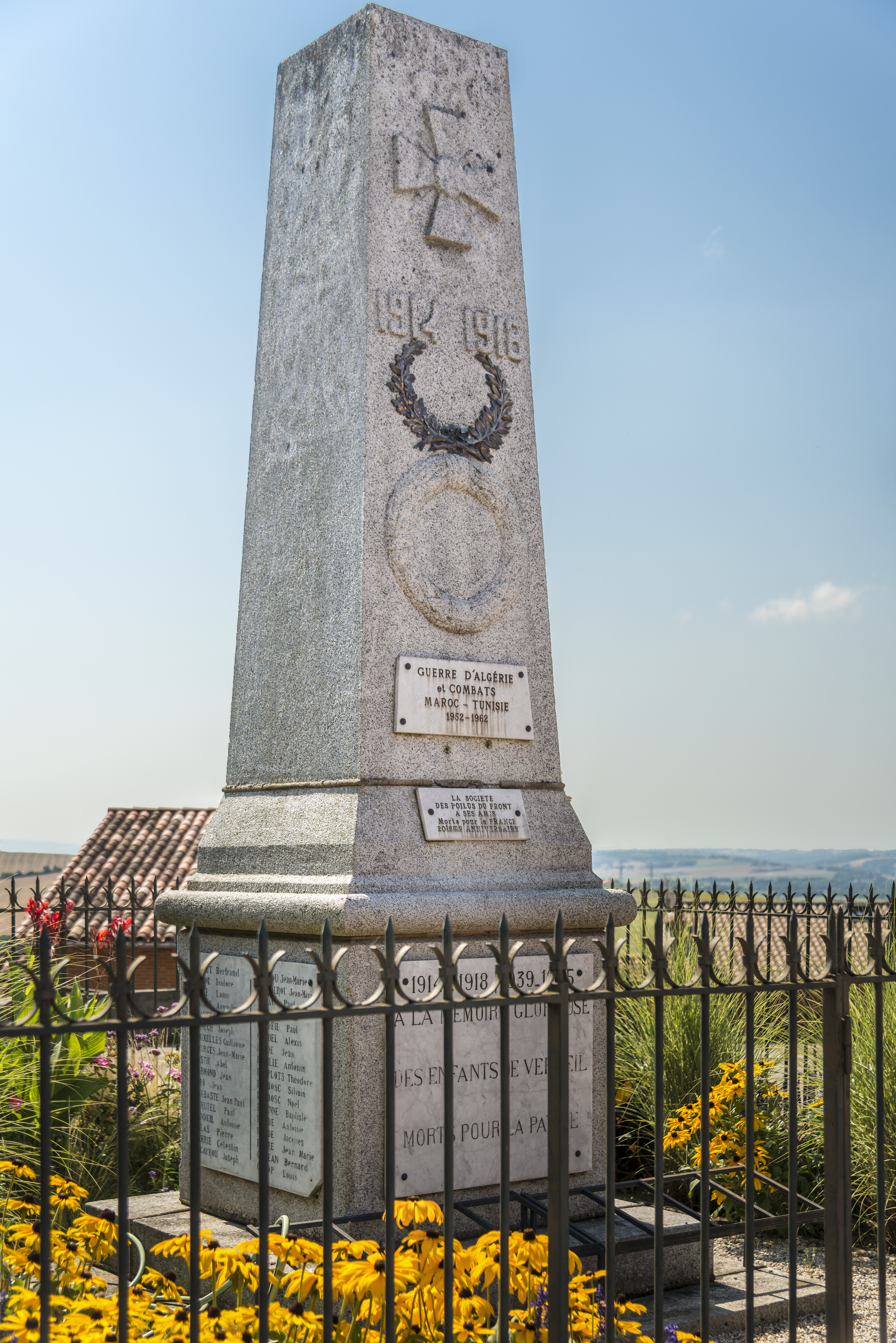
War Memorial

== See also ==
- Communes of the Haute-Garonne department
