= European route E9 =

Road in trans-European E-road network

E9

Route information
- Length: 967 km (601 mi)

Major junctions
- North end: Orléans, France
- South end: Barcelona, Spain

Location
- Countries: France, Spain

Highway system
- International E-road network; A Class; B Class

The European route E9 is part of the United Nations international E-road network. It starts at Orléans, France, and goes south to Barcelona, Spain.

== France ==
In France, the E9 follows these roads:

- A 71: Orléans - Vierzon
- A 20: Vierzon - Châteauroux - Limoges - Cahors - Montauban - Toulouse
- A 61: Toulouse - A66 Junction
- A 66: A66 Junction - Foix
- N 20: Foix - Ax-les-Thermes - Spain

== Spain ==
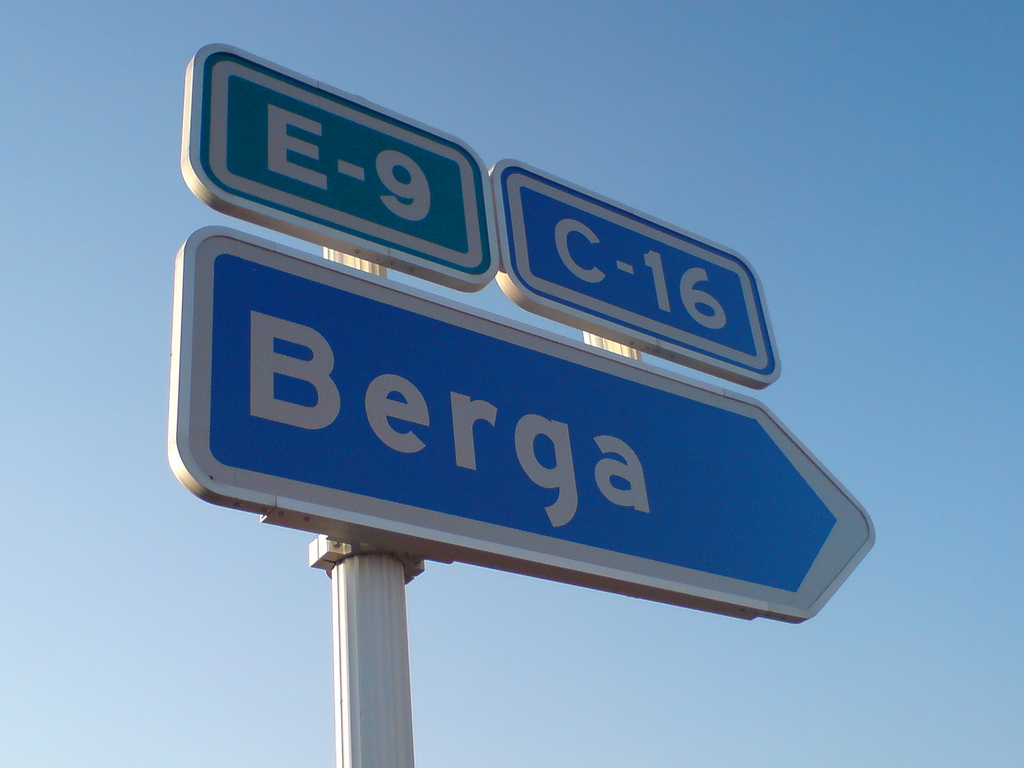
C16-E9 sign in Spain

In Spain, the E9 follows these roads:

- N-152: France — Puigcerdà
- N-260: Puigcerdà — Queixans
- C-162: Queixans — Riu de Cerdanya
- C-16: Riu de Cerdanya - Berga - Manresa - Terrassa - Barcelona
