= A51 autoroute =

Road in France

A51 autoroute
- Autoroute du Trièves (Northern section)

Route information
- Part of E712
- Maintained by Bouches-du-Rhône, AREA, ESCOTA
- Length: 172 km (107 mi)
- Existed: 1953–present

Major junctions
- South end: E714 / A 7 in Septèmes-les-Vallons

- E80 / A 8 / E712 / N 296 in Aix-en-Provence; N 85 in La Saulce; E712 / N 75 in Sisteron and Monestier-de-Clermont

- North end: E712 / A 480 in Claix

Location
- Country: France

Highway system
- Roads in France; Autoroutes; Routes nationales

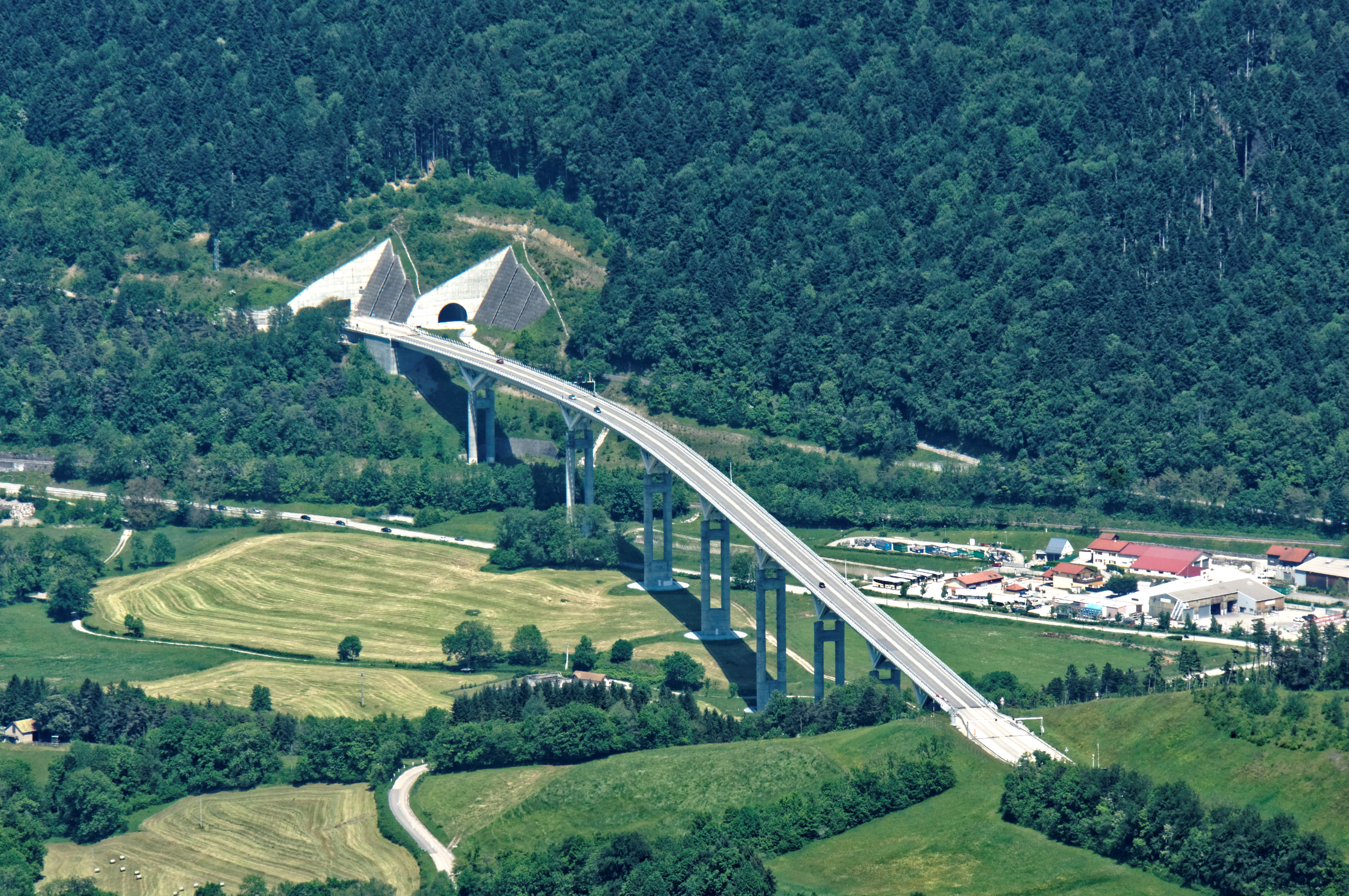
Single-carriageway part of the northern section of the A51

The A51 autoroute is a partly completed motorway in southeast France. It currently exists as two sections separated by a gap of approximately 85 km, the northern section sometimes referred to as the A51N.

It is the long-term project to connect Marseille to Grenoble via Aix-en-Provence, the Durance Valley and the Hautes-Alpes department, providing a high-capacity alternative to the heavily used A7 following the Rhône valley.

== History ==
The first section was built in 1953, it connected the Autoroute de nord (open in 1951) to Cabriès. It was only extended to Aix-en-Provence and the A8 in 1970. The construction of the section from Grenoble to Sisteron was subject to protests because of its environmental impact. In 1995 for example, demonstrators blocked work by chaining themselves to construction equipment.

== Northern section ==
The section at the Grenoble end, from Varces to Coynelle (17 km), was opened in July 1999. This was extended in March 2007 when the next section, connecting Coynelle to the Col du Fau (10.5 km), was opened in March 2007.

This section includes 4.5 km of single carriageway through the Tunnel of Sinard and over the Viaduct de Monestier. The opening of this section has greatly reduced the summer congestion through the commune of Monestier. This northern section is a toll road operated by AREA.

== Southern section ==
The motorway passes the cities of Aix-en-Provence, Pertuis, Manosque, Sisteron and then Digne-les-Bains and Tallard. In the Isère department, it passes Monestier-de-Clermont, Vif and Varces-Allières-et-Risset. The motorway provides access to the southwestern Alps for the residents of the South of France.

Its southern section connects Marseille to Aix-en-Provence and the Durance Valley to the north of Sisteron (Saulce). Only 18 km is toll free between Marseilles and Aix-en-Provence, the remaining 128 km is a toll road operated by Escota between Aix-en-Provence and Saulce. At Aix-en-Provence, the autoroute becomes briefly the N296 dual-carriageway between the exits Jas-de-Boufan and Aix-les-Platanes. This section where it meets the N7 was originally proposed to be an autoroute but building has subsequently compromised the route. There is a speed limit of 50 km/h on part of the N296.

== List of junctions ==
=== Southern section ===
Region	Department	Junction	Destinations	Notes
Provence-Alpes-Côte d'Azur	Bouches-du-Rhône	A7 - A51	Marseille - centre, Saint-Antoine	
Provence-Alpes-Côte d'Azur	Bouches-du-Rhône	A7 - A51	Fos - Martigues (A55), Marignane, Marseille - L'Estaque	
Provence-Alpes-Côte d'Azur	Bouches-du-Rhône	1 : Plan-de-Campagne	Aix-en-Provence - Jas-de-Bouffan, Encagnane, Les Milles	
Provence-Alpes-Côte d'Azur	Bouches-du-Rhône	2 : Bouc-Bel-Air ( A515 - A51)	Gardanne, Simiane-Collongue, Bouc-Bel-Air	Entry and exit from Marseille
Provence-Alpes-Côte d'Azur	Bouches-du-Rhône	Aire des Chabauds (Northbound); Aire de la Champouse (Southbound)		
Provence-Alpes-Côte d'Azur	Bouches-du-Rhône	3 : Luynes	Aix-en-Provence - Pôle d'Activités, Bouc-Bel-Air, Luynes	
Provence-Alpes-Côte d'Azur	Bouches-du-Rhône	4 : Gardanne	Gardanne, Luynes	
Provence-Alpes-Côte d'Azur	Bouches-du-Rhône	5 : Les Milles	Aix-en-Provence - Pôle d'Activités, Pont-de-l'Arc, Les Milles, Aix - TGV, Marseille-Provence	
Provence-Alpes-Côte d'Azur	Bouches-du-Rhône	6 : Aix-en-Provence - centre	Aix-en-Provence	
Provence-Alpes-Côte d'Azur	Bouches-du-Rhône	A8 - A51	Lyon (A7), Avignon, Salon-de-Provence	
Provence-Alpes-Côte d'Azur	Bouches-du-Rhône	A8 - A51	Nice, Toulon (A52), Aubagne, Aix-en-Provence - Pont de l'Arc, Val-Saint-André	
Provence-Alpes-Côte d'Azur	Bouches-du-Rhône	7 : Aix-en-Provence - Jas-de-Bouffan	Berre-l'Étang, Aix-en-Provence - Encagnane, centre, Lyon (A8), Avignon, Salon-de-Provence	
Provence-Alpes-Côte d'Azur	Bouches-du-Rhône	E712 / A 51 becomes E712 / N 296		
Provence-Alpes-Côte d'Azur	Bouches-du-Rhône	8 : Aix-en-Provence - centre	Aix-en-Provence - Pontier, Centre Hospitalier du Pays d'Aix	Entry and exit from Gap
Provence-Alpes-Côte d'Azur	Bouches-du-Rhône	9 : La Chevalière	Gap (A51), La Chevalière	
Provence-Alpes-Côte d'Azur	Bouches-du-Rhône	RD 7^{N} - RN 296	Nîmes, Avignon, Salon-de-Provence, Saint-Cannat, Célony	
Provence-Alpes-Côte d'Azur	Bouches-du-Rhône	10 : Puyricard	Le Puy-Sainte-Réparade, Aix-en-Provence, Oppidum d'Entremont	
Provence-Alpes-Côte d'Azur	Bouches-du-Rhône	Aire de Saint-Hilaire (Westbound); Aire de Barcelone (Eastbound)		
Provence-Alpes-Côte d'Azur	Bouches-du-Rhône	11 : Chemin Saint-Donat	Chemin Saint-Donat	
Provence-Alpes-Côte d'Azur	Bouches-du-Rhône	E712 / N 296 becomes again E712 / A 51		
Provence-Alpes-Côte d'Azur	Bouches-du-Rhône	12 : Aix-en-Provence - Les Platanes	Aix-en-Provence - nord	
Provence-Alpes-Côte d'Azur	Bouches-du-Rhône	13 : Venelles	Venelles	
Provence-Alpes-Côte d'Azur	Bouches-du-Rhône	14 : Meyrargues	Gap, Digne-les-Bains, Sisteron, Manosque, Meyrargues, Pertuis	Entry and exit from Marseille
Provence-Alpes-Côte d'Azur	Bouches-du-Rhône	Aire de Meyrargues (Northbound); Aire de Meyrargues-Fontbelle (Southbound)		
Provence-Alpes-Côte d'Azur	Bouches-du-Rhône	Péage de Meyrargues		
Provence-Alpes-Côte d'Azur	Bouches-du-Rhône	15 : Pertuis	Le Puy-Sainte-Réparade, Pertuis	
Provence-Alpes-Côte d'Azur	Bouches-du-Rhône	Aire de Jouques (Southbound)		
Provence-Alpes-Côte d'Azur	Bouches-du-Rhône	Aire du Pont Mirabeau (Northbound)		
Provence-Alpes-Côte d'Azur	Bouches-du-Rhône	17 : Saint-Paul-lès-Durance	Saint-Paul-lès-Durance, Vinon-sur-Verdon, Gréoux-les-Bains, Centre d'Études Atomiques de Cadarache	
Provence-Alpes-Côte d'Azur	Alpes-de-Haute-Provence	18 : Manosque	Valensole, Gréoux-les-Bains, Manosque	
Provence-Alpes-Côte d'Azur	Alpes-de-Haute-Provence	Aire de Manosque (Northbound); Aire de Volx (Southbound)		
Provence-Alpes-Côte d'Azur	Alpes-de-Haute-Provence	19 : La Brillanne	Forcalquier, Oraison	
Provence-Alpes-Côte d'Azur	Alpes-de-Haute-Provence	Aire de Ganagobie		
Provence-Alpes-Côte d'Azur	Alpes-de-Haute-Provence	20 : Peyruis	Digne-les-Bains, Château-Arnoux-Saint-Auban, Les Mées, Peyruis	
Provence-Alpes-Côte d'Azur	Alpes-de-Haute-Provence	Aire du Belvédère de Peyruis - Les Mées (Southbound)		
Provence-Alpes-Côte d'Azur	Alpes-de-Haute-Provence	21 : Aubignosc	Nice, Digne-les-Bains, Château-Arnoux-Saint-Auban, Aubignosc	
Provence-Alpes-Côte d'Azur	Alpes-de-Haute-Provence	Aire d'Aubignosc		
Provence-Alpes-Côte d'Azur	Alpes-de-Haute-Provence	22 : Sisteron - sud	Sisteron - centre, Vallée du Jabron	
Provence-Alpes-Côte d'Azur	Alpes-de-Haute-Provence	23 : Sisteron - nord	Grenoble by the Col de la Croix-Haute, Sisteron, La Motte-du-Caire, Laragne-Montéglin	
Provence-Alpes-Côte d'Azur	Alpes-de-Haute-Provence	E712 / A 51 becomes A 51		
Provence-Alpes-Côte d'Azur	Hautes-Alpes	24 : La Saulce	Gap, La Saulce, Tallard, Curbans, La Motte-du-Caire	
Provence-Alpes-Côte d'Azur	Hautes-Alpes	24 : La Saulce	Péage de La Saulce	
A 51 Southern section ends at N 85
1.000 mi = 1.609 km; 1.000 km = 0.621 mi

=== Northern section ===
Region	Department	Junction	Destinations	Notes
Auvergne-Rhône-Alpes	Isère			
Auvergne-Rhône-Alpes	Isère	E712 / A 480 becomes E712 / A 51		
Auvergne-Rhône-Alpes	Isère	10 : Varces	Varces, Claix - Les Bauches	Entry and exit from Grenoble
Auvergne-Rhône-Alpes	Isère	11 : Saint-Paul de Varces	Saint-Paul de Varces	Entry and exit from Grenoble
Auvergne-Rhône-Alpes	Isère	12 : Vif	Sisteron par RD, Vif, Varces	
Auvergne-Rhône-Alpes	Isère	Péage du Crozet		
Auvergne-Rhône-Alpes	Isère	13 : Sinard	Sinard, Lac de Monteynard-Avignonet	Entry and exit from Grenoble
Auvergne-Rhône-Alpes	Isère	13 : Sinard	Aire des Jallets (Southbound); Aire des Marceaux (Northbound)	
Auvergne-Rhône-Alpes	Isère	E712 / A 51 Northern section ends at E712 / N 75		
1.000 mi = 1.609 km; 1.000 km = 0.621 mi

== Future ==
Following many ministerial and policy changes, and tensions between local residents. As a result, the completion of the motorway has been on the agenda for 20 years.

Were all the sections completed the road journey from Grenoble-Marseille would be 2h40 (instead of the current 3h30). However, there are several problems:

- The design of the road
- The class of roads (toll/free autoroute, expressway or upgrade of the current roads (N75 and N85)
- The cost of the project.
- Strong environmental impact of the route.

The motorway must pass through the middle of the South-Dauphiné (Trièves) Alps. There were two options for the route between the Col de Fau (Monestier-de-Clermont) and the end of the southern section near Gap:

1. The "High Route" was the most direct route over several high passes to Sisteron (The budget at the time was envisaged at 1.8 billion euros)
2. "Gap East" (via the Drac valley, the Col de Bayard and the Avance valley) to Saulce the current end of the motorway from Marseille (the budget was envisaged to be approximately 2.2 billion euros).

Following a public inquiry organized between 2005 and 2006, the Minister Mr Perben announced in 2006 that A51 would be built on the Gap East route. However the 2011 edition of the National Scheme of Transport Infrastructure (SNIT) did not include the completion of this section. Completion before 2025 is unlikely.
