= European route E80 =

Road in trans-European E-road network

E80

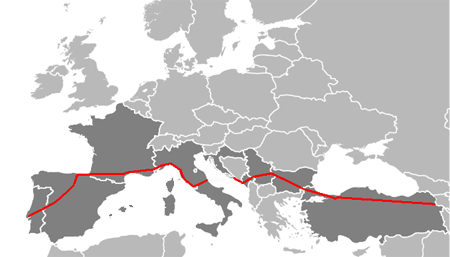

Route information
- Length: 6,102 km (3,792 mi)

Major junctions
- West end: Lisbon, Portugal
- East end: Gürbulak, Turkey

Location
- Countries: Portugal; Spain; France; Italy; Croatia; Montenegro; Kosovo; Serbia; Bulgaria; Turkey

Highway system
- International E-road network; A Class; B Class

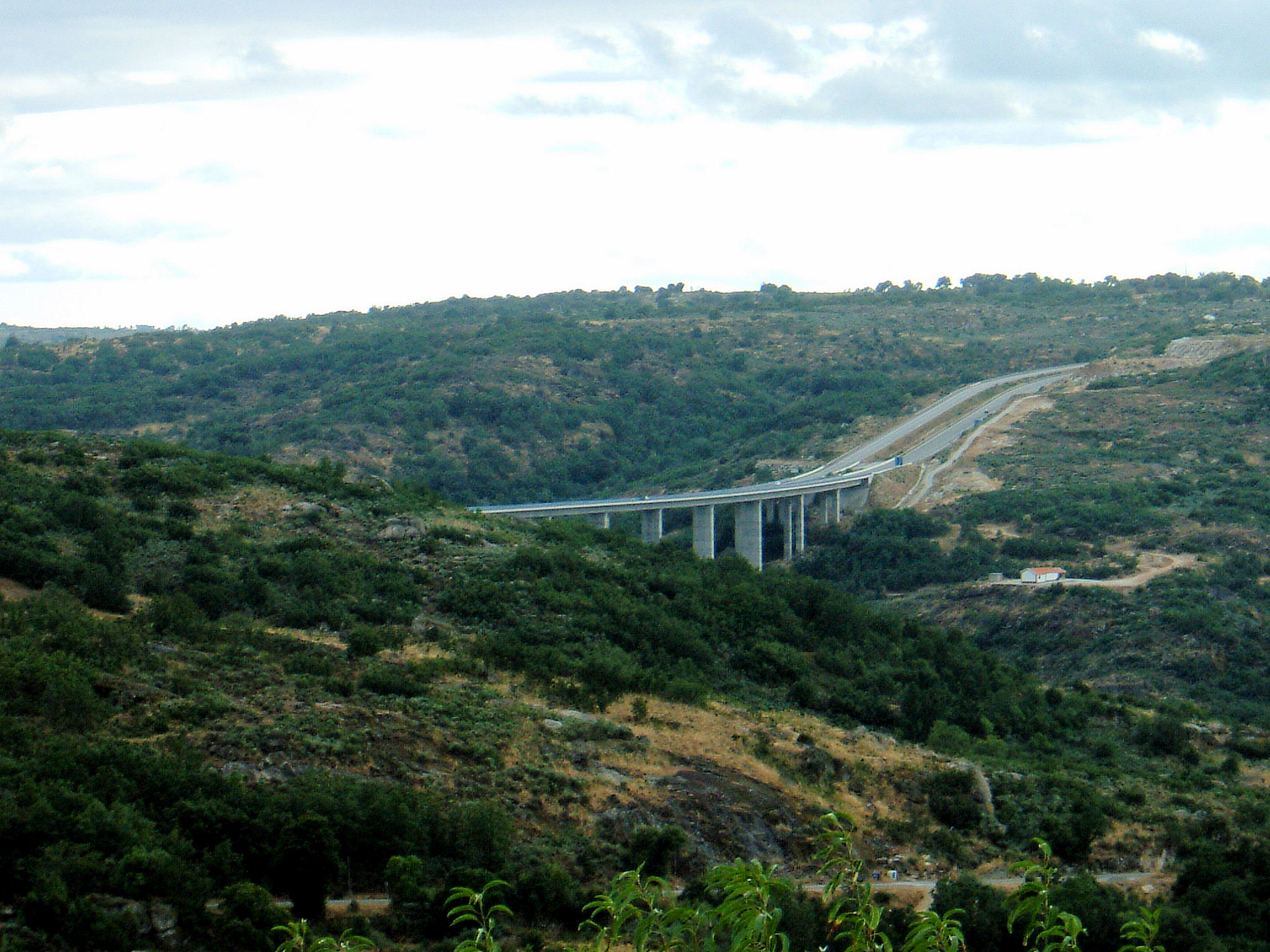
European route 80 in the section Guarda - Vilar Formoso, Portugal.

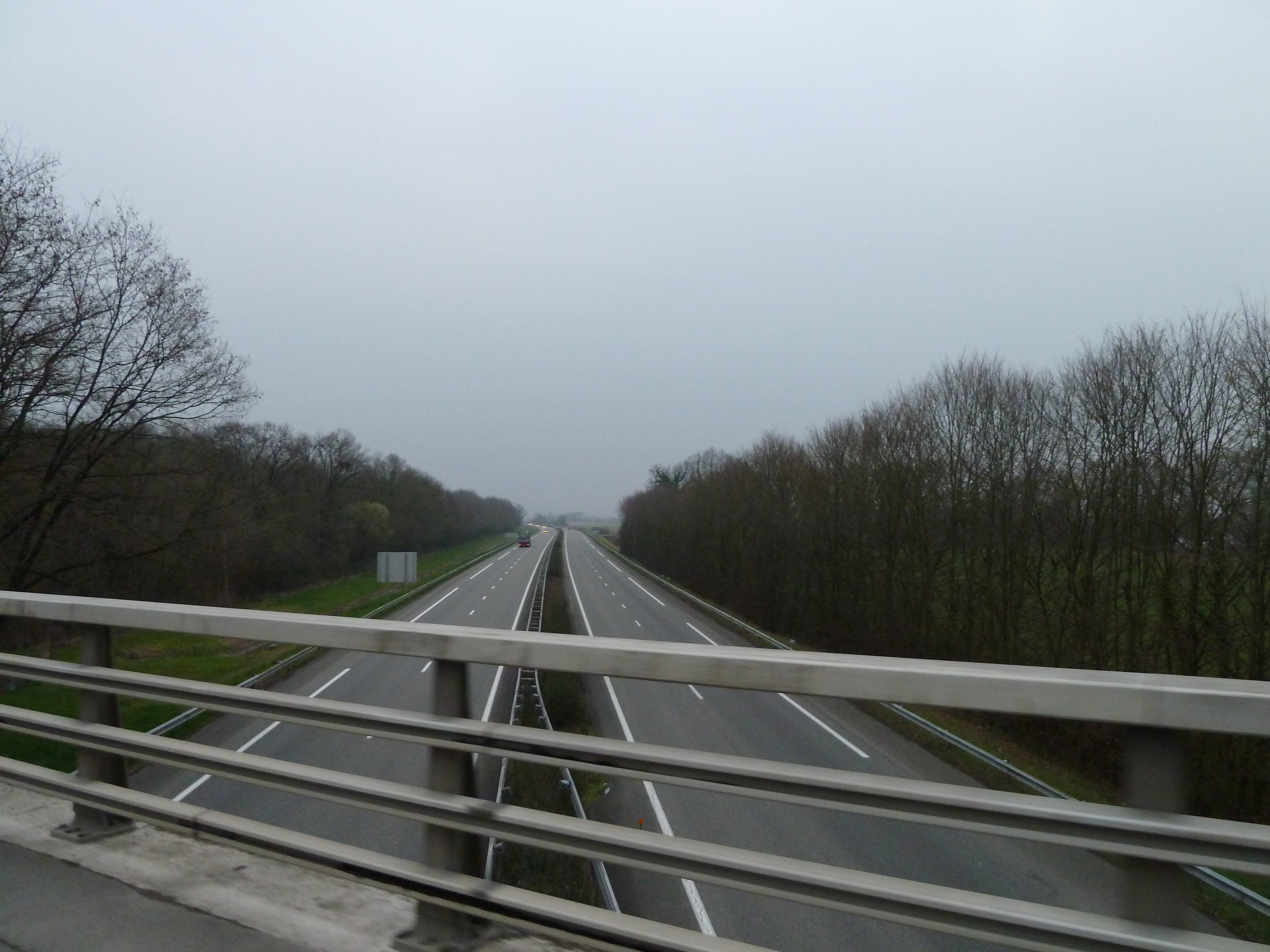
A64 autoroute is a motorway in south western France, at Pau here.

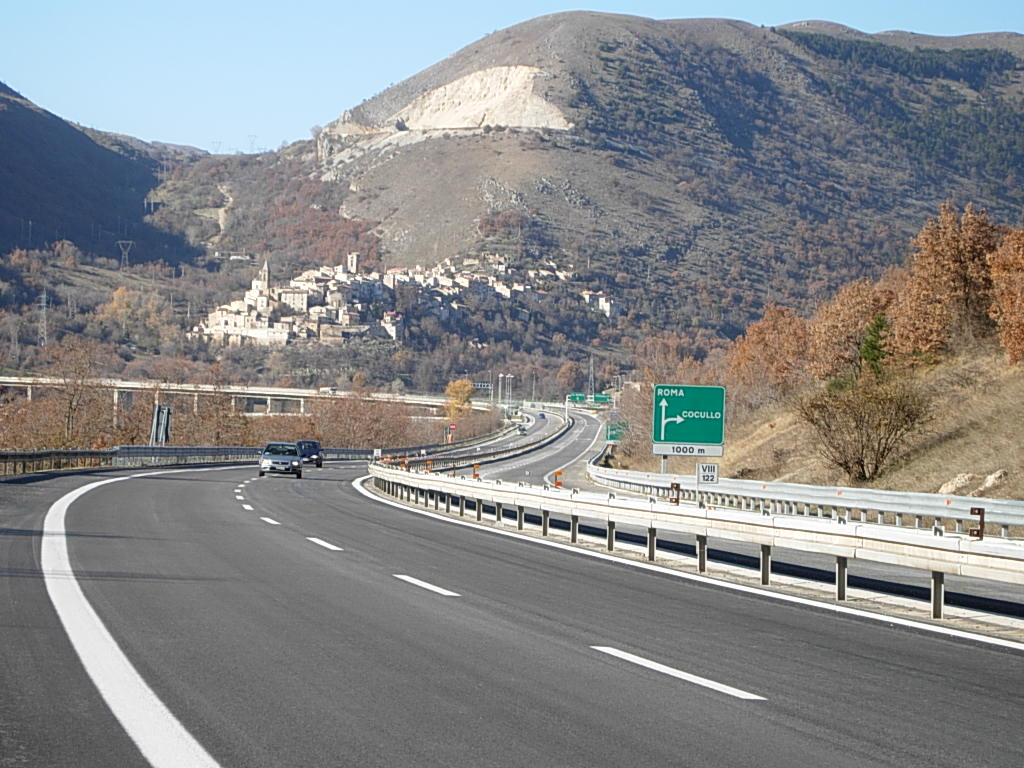
European route 80 near Cocullo, Italy.

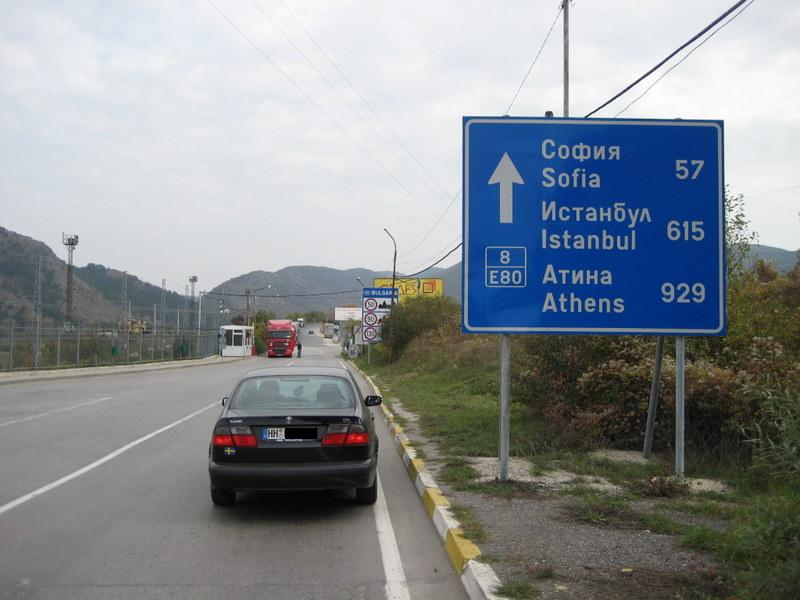
European route 80 near Dragoman, Bulgaria (border to Serbia).

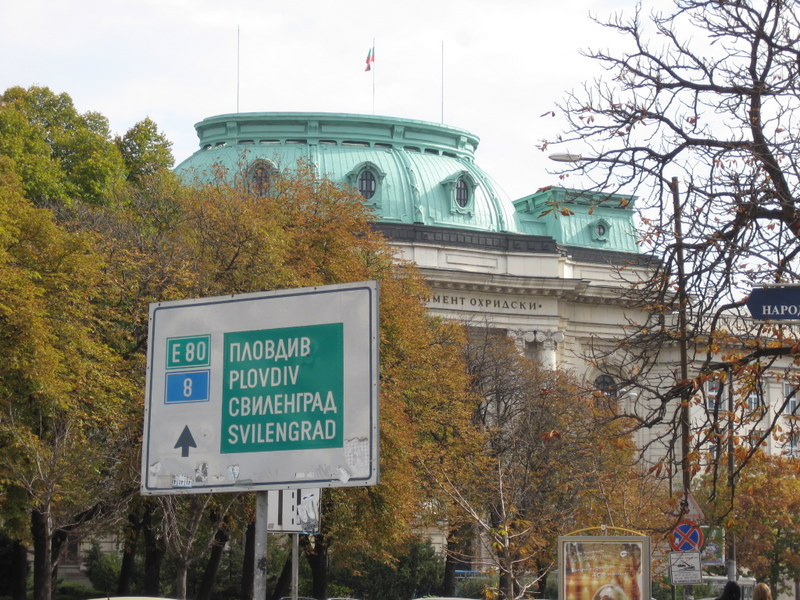
Bilingual sign to E 80 in Sofia.

European route E80, is an A-Class West-East European route, extending from Lisbon, Portugal to Gürbulak, Turkey, on the border with Iran. The road connects 10 countries and has a length of approximately 6,102 kilometres (3,792 mi). Part of the route overlaps with the Trans-European Motorways (TEM) network. At its eastern end it joins end-on with Asian Highway AH1 which continues all the way to Tokyo, Japan.

== Route ==
Portugal

- A 1 / IP 1: Lisbon ( E90, start of concurrency with E01) - Torres Novas ( E806) - Coimbra ( E801) - Aveiro (end of concurrency with E01)
- A 25: Aveiro ( E01) - Viseu ( E801) - Guarda ( E802 E806) - Vilar Formoso

Spain

- A-62: Fuentes de Oñoro - Salamanca ( E803) - Tordesillas ( E82) - Burgos
- B-30: Burgos ( E5)
- A-1: Burgos (start of concurrency with E5)
- AP-1: Burgos - Miranda de Ebro ( E804) - Vitoria-Gasteiz
- N-620: Vitoria-Gasteiz
- AP-1: Vitoria-Gasteiz - Eibar ( E70)
- AP-1 / AP-8: Eibar (start of concurrency with E70) - Donostia/S. Sebastian - Irún

France

- A 63: Hendaye - Bayonne (end of concurrency with E5 E70)
- A 64: Bayonne ( E5 E70) - Pau ( E7) - Toulouse ( E9)
- A 620: Toulouse ( E9 E72)
- A 61: Toulouse ( E72) - Villefranche-de-Lauragais ( E72) - Carcassonne - Narbonne ( E15)
- A 9: Narbonne (start of concurrency with E15) - Béziers ( E11) - Montpellier - Nîmes (end of concurrency with E15)
- A 54: Nîmes ( E15) - Salon-de-Provence ( E714)
- A 7: Salon-de-Provence ( E714) - Aix-en-Provence ( E714)
- A 8: Aix-en-Provence ( E712 E714) - Nice

Italy

- A 10: Ventimiglia ( E74) - Savona ( E717) - Genoa ( E25)
- A 12: Genoa ( E25 E62) - La Spezia ( E33) - Lucca ( E76) - Rosignano Solvay
- SS 1: Rosignano Solvay - Grosseto ( E78) - Tarquinia ( E840)
- A 12: Tarquinia ( E840) - Civitavecchia
- A 91: Civitavecchia - Rome
- A 90: Rome ( E35 E821)
- A 24: Rome - Tivoli ( E45) - Borgorose
- A 25: Borgorose - Pescara
- RA 12: Pescara ( E55)
- SS 16dir-C: Pescara ( E55) - Porto di Pescara

Gap - Adriatic Sea

- : Porto di Pescara - Dubrovnik. As of the current moment (2026), there is no direct car ferry service between Pescara (Italy) and Dubrovnik (Croatia). In the past, there were seasonal lines (including high-speed catamarans), but they have not operated regularly for years. If you want to travel by car from this region of Italy to Dubrovnik, the closest and most convenient alternative by sea is ferry from Bari (south of Pescara) to Dubrovnik.

Croatia

- D8: Dubrovnik (start of concurrency with E65) - Karasovići

Montenegro

- M-1: Debeli Brijeg - Petrovac na Moru (start of concurrency with E-851) - Sutomore (end of concurrency with E-851)
- M-1.1: Sutomore ( E-851) - Virpazar
- M-2: Virpazar - Podgorica ( E-762) - Ribarevine ( E-763)
- M-5: Ribarevine ( E-763) - Berane (Note: The route between Montenegro and Kosovo is unclear, a problem currently shared with E65 which is concurrent with E80 on this section. The existing M-2 road that goes through Bijelo Polje continues northwards through western Serbia as E763, away from the direction of Pristina. Instead the route needs to turn to the east some 4 km (2.5 mi) before Bijelo Polje, at Ribarevina junction, and towards Priština. After that, the route goes southeast, throrugh Berane and Rožaje, where the route winds slightly northwards again, goes through western Serbia near Tutin, and then enters Kosovo near Zubin Potok.) - Dračenovac

Serbia

- 22: Špiljani - Ribariće
- 32: Ribariće - Vitkoviće

Kosovo

- M-2: Bërnjak - Mitrovica - Pristina (end of concurrency with E65)
- R 7: Pristina - Trudë
- M-25: Trudë - Merdar

Serbia

- 35: Merdare - Prokuplje - Merošina (start of concurrency with E75)
- A1: Merošina - Trupale (end of concurrency with E75)
- A4: Niš ( E771) - Pirot - Gradinje

Bulgaria

- I-8: Kalotina - Dragoman
- A 6: Dragoman - Sofia ( E79)
- I-18: Sofia ( E79 E871)
- A 1: Sofia - Plovdiv - Chirpan ( E773)
- A 4: Chirpan ( E773) - Dimitrovgrad ( E85) - Svilengrad ( E85) - Kapitan Andreevo

Turkey

- D.100: Kapıkule - Edirne
- O-3: Edirne - Babaeski ( E87) - Lüleburgaz - Çorlu - Silivri ( E84)
- O-7: Silivri - Istanbul (Note: Previously O-2 was used, it has been banned to use by international transit trucks and busses since opening of Yavuz Sultan Selim Bridge.) - Gebze( E881) - Izmit - Adapazari - Hendek
- O-4: Hendek - Düzce - Bolu - Gerede ( E89)
- D.100: Gerede ( E89) - Ilgaz - Merzifon ( E95) - Refahiye ( E88) - Erzincan - Aşkale ( E97) - Erzurum - Horasan ( E691) - Ağrı - Doğubeyazıt ( E99) - Gürbulak

Iran

- Road 32 / AH1: Bazargan

== Coordinates ==
- Western Terminus - Lisbon 38°47′24.2″N 9°6′49.6″W
- Eastern Terminus - Gürbulak 39°24′37″N 44°22′41.6″E
