= Canton of Aix-en-Provence-IV =

Coordinates: 43.5333°N 5.4333°E

Aix-en-Provence-IV
- Former canton
- Interactive map of Aix-en-Provence-IV
- Country: France
- Region: Provence-Alpes-Côte d'Azur
- Department: Bouches-du-Rhône
- No. of communes: {{{nbcomm}}}
- Disbanded: 2015
- Population (2012): 70,749

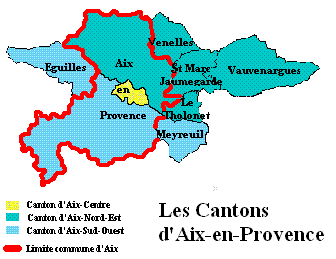

The Canton of Aix-en-Provence-IV or Aix-en-Provence-Sud-Ouest is a former canton in the Bouches-du-Rhône department of France. It was created 27 February 2003 by the decree 2003-156. It was disbanded following the French canton reorganisation which came into effect in March 2015. At 70,749 inhabitants (2012), it was the most populous canton in France.

Elected to represent the canton in the General Council of Bouches-du-Rhône:

- André Guinde (Socialist Party (France), 2004–2010)

== Composition ==
The canton is made up of the following communes:

- Aix-en-Provence (southwest : 58,003 inhabitants)
- Éguilles
- Meyreuil

== Villages of Aix included in the canton ==
- Luynes
- Les Milles
- Les Granettes
- Brédasque
- Jas-de-Bouffan
- Pont-de-l'Arc
- La Parade
- Célony
- La Beauvalle
- Les Deux-Ormes
- Saint-Mitre

== See also ==
- Arrondissement of Aix-en-Provence
- Cantons of the Bouches-du-Rhône department
- Communes of the Bouches-du-Rhône department
