= A7 autoroute =

Controlled-access motorway from Lyon to Marseille, France

A7 autoroute
- Autoroute du Soleil

Route information
- Part of E15 / E80 / E712 / E714
- Maintained by DIR Centre-Est; ASF; DIR Méditerranée
- Length: 306 km (190 mi)
- Existed: 1951–present

Major junctions
- North end: M 7 at Oullins-Pierre-Bénite (Lyon)
- A 450 in Oullins-Pierre-Bénite; E15 / A 46 / A 47 in Ternay; E15 / A 9 in Orange; E80 / A 54 in Salon-de-Provence; E80 / A 8 in Coudoux; A 55 in Les Pennes-Mirabeau; E712 / A 51 in Septèmes-les-Vallons; A 507 in Marseille; A 557 in Marseille
- South end: Marseille

Location
- Country: France

Highway system
- Roads in France; Autoroutes; Routes nationales

The A7 autoroute (French: Autoroute A7), also known simply as the A7 or, along with the A6, as the Autoroute du Soleil ([otoʁut dy sɔlɛj]; English: Motorway of the Sun), is an autoroute (motorway) in France. It continues the M7 and links Lyon to Marseille. It is 306 km (190 mi) long and forms part of European routes E15, E80, E712, and E714. It is the southern part of the route from Paris (A6) to the Mediterranean.

== History ==
The part of the road in Marseille was built by the Nazi invaders in 1941.

The section of the motorway going through Lyon between La Mulatière and Perrache train station has been declassified in 2020, which were downgraded to a fast lane in 2017, have been transformed into an urban boulevard under the name M7 (route métropolitaine 7).

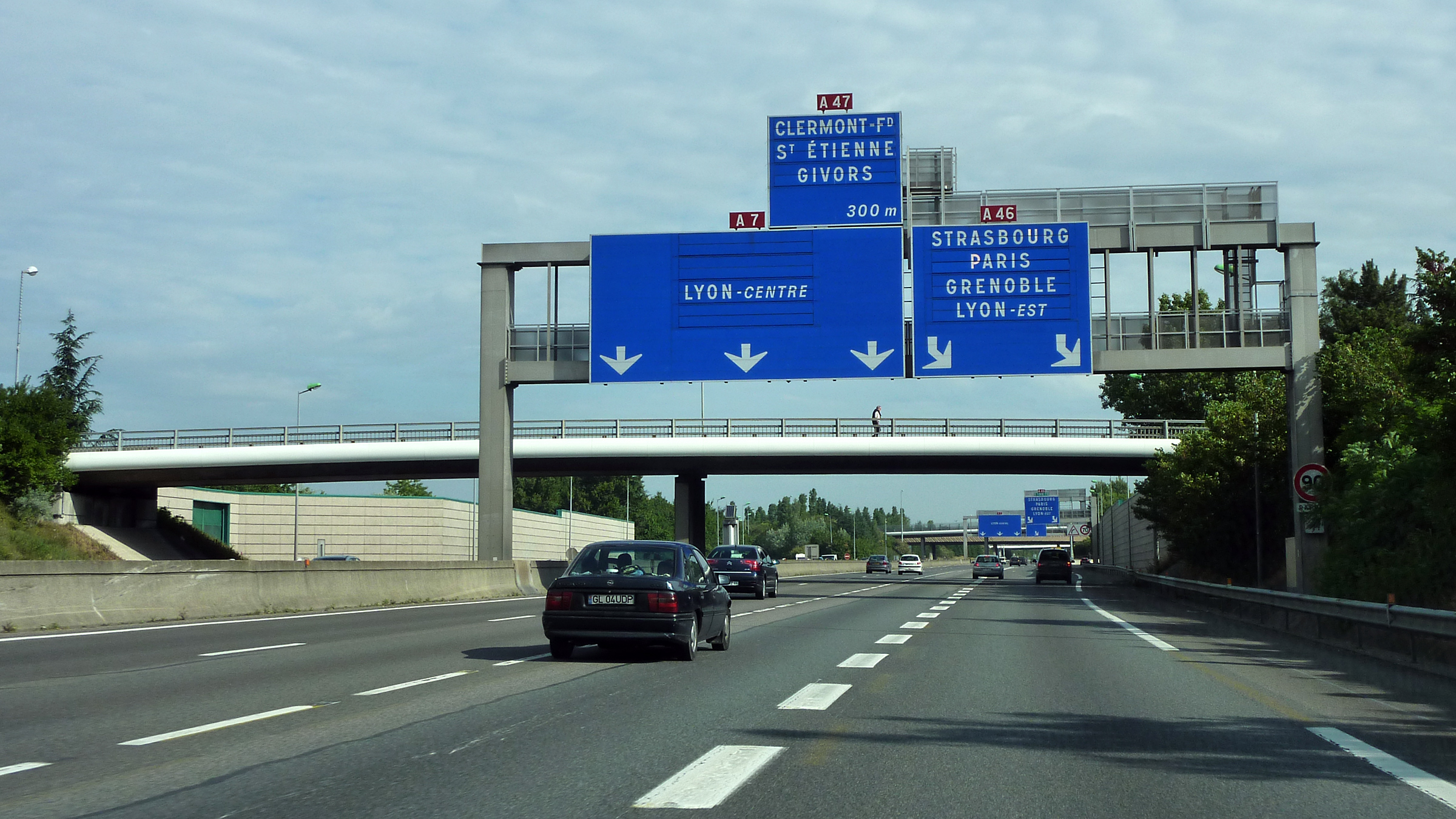
A7 Autoroute near Lyon

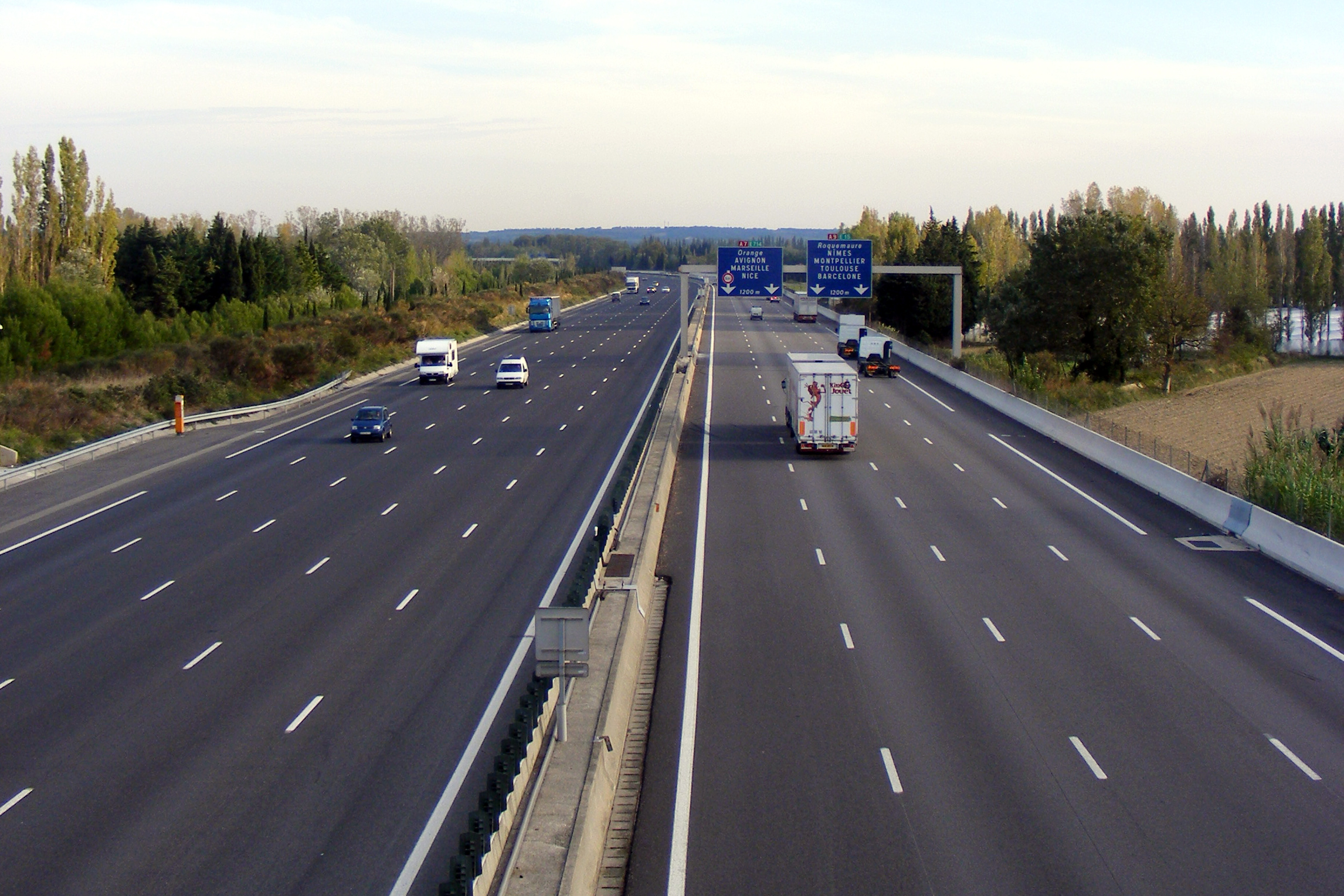
A7 Autoroute near Orange

== List of exits and junctions ==
=== M7 ===
Region	Department	Junctions	Destinations	Notes
M 7 becomes M 6 (A6)
Auvergne-Rhône-Alpes	Rhône	M6 - M7	Paris (A6), Clermont-Ferrand (A89)	
Auvergne-Rhône-Alpes	Rhône	1.1 : La Part-Dieu	Lyon, Saint-Joseph Saint-Luc	
Auvergne-Rhône-Alpes	Rhône	1.2 : Lyon- centre	Lyon - Presqu'Île	
Auvergne-Rhône-Alpes	Rhône	1.3 : Gerland	Lyon - La Confluence, Perrache, Musée des Confluences	
Auvergne-Rhône-Alpes	Rhône	2 : La Mulatière	La Mulatière, Oullins - centre	
Auvergne-Rhône-Alpes	Rhône	3 : Oullins - La Saulaie	Oullins	Exit from Lyon and entry to Marseille
Auvergne-Rhône-Alpes	Rhône	4 : Pierre-Bénite - nord	Oullins-Pierre-Bénite, Oullins - La Saulaie, Z. I. Les Lônes	
M 7 overlaps and becomes A 7
1.000 mi = 1.609 km; 1.000 km = 0.621 mi

=== A7 ===
Region	Department	Junctions	Destinations	Notes
Auvergne-Rhône-Alpes	Rhône			
Auvergne-Rhône-Alpes	Rhône	A450 - M7 & A7	Oullins-Pierre-Bénite, Brignais, Hôpitaux sud	
Auvergne-Rhône-Alpes	Rhône	5 : Saint-Fons	Saint-Fons Boulevard Périphérique	
Auvergne-Rhône-Alpes	Rhône	6 : Feyzin	Vénissieux, Saint-Priest, Feyzin, Z. I. - Lyon - Sud Est, Belle Étoile	
Auvergne-Rhône-Alpes	Rhône	Aire de Solaize (Northbound)		
Auvergne-Rhône-Alpes	Rhône	7 : Solaize	Solaize, Vernaison, Saint-Symphorien-d'Ozon, Pôle de Recherche	
Auvergne-Rhône-Alpes	Rhône	Aire de Sérézin-du-Rhône (Southbound)		
Auvergne-Rhône-Alpes	Rhône	A46 & A47- A7	Paris (A6), Strasbourg (A42), Grenoble (A43), Genève	
Auvergne-Rhône-Alpes	Rhône	A46 & A47- A7	Saint-Étienne, Givors, Chasse-sur-Rhône, Clermont-Ferrand (A72)	
Auvergne-Rhône-Alpes	Rhône	A 7 becomes E15 / A 7		
Auvergne-Rhône-Alpes	Isère	8 : Chasse - sud	Chasse-sur-Rhône	
Auvergne-Rhône-Alpes	Isère	9 : Vienne - nord	Vienne, Valence, Grenoble	
Auvergne-Rhône-Alpes	Isère	10 : Condrieu	Ampuis, Condrieu	
Auvergne-Rhône-Alpes	Isère	11 : Vienne - sud	Vienne, L'Isle-d'Abeau	
Auvergne-Rhône-Alpes	Isère	Péage de Vienne-Reventin + Aire de Vienne-Reventin		
Auvergne-Rhône-Alpes	Isère	Aire d'Auberives (Southbound); Aire de La Grande Borne (Northbound)		
Auvergne-Rhône-Alpes	Isère	Aire de Roussillon (Southbound)		
Auvergne-Rhône-Alpes	Isère	11.1 : Auberives	Auberives-sur-Varèze	
Auvergne-Rhône-Alpes	Isère	12 : Chanas	Chanas, Annonay, Péage-de-Roussillon, Salaise-sur-Sanne	
Auvergne-Rhône-Alpes	Drôme	Aire de Saint-Rambert-d'Albon		
Auvergne-Rhône-Alpes	Drôme	Aire du Bornaron (Southbound); Aire de La Galaure (Northbound)		
Auvergne-Rhône-Alpes	Drôme	Aire de La Bouterne (Northbound)		
Auvergne-Rhône-Alpes	Drôme	13 : Tain-l'Hermitage	Tain-l'Hermitage, Tournon-sur-Rhône, Romans-sur-Isère, Saint-Donat	
Auvergne-Rhône-Alpes	Drôme	Aire du Pont de l'Isère (Southbound); Aire de Latitude 45 (Northbound)		
Auvergne-Rhône-Alpes	Drôme	14 : Valence - nord	Valence - centre, Bourg-lès-Valence	
Auvergne-Rhône-Alpes	Drôme	15 : Valence - sud	Valence, Grenoble (A49 by RN 532), Romans-sur-Isère, Gap, Crest, Portes-lès-Valence	
Auvergne-Rhône-Alpes	Drôme	Aire de Portes Les Valence		
Auvergne-Rhône-Alpes	Drôme	Aire de Bellevue (Southbound); Aire de Livron (Northbound)		
Auvergne-Rhône-Alpes	Drôme	16 : Loriol	Loriol-sur-Drôme, Crest, Privas, La Voulte, Livron, Mémorial des Sapeurs-Pompiers de Loriol	
Auvergne-Rhône-Alpes	Drôme	Aire de Bras de Zil (Southbound); Aire de Saulce (Northbound)		
Auvergne-Rhône-Alpes	Drôme	17 : Montélimar - nord	Montélimar, Le Teil, Dieulefit, Saulce-sur-Rhône	
Auvergne-Rhône-Alpes	Drôme	Aire de la Coucourde (Southbound); Aire du Logis Neuf (Northbound)		
Auvergne-Rhône-Alpes	Drôme	Aire de Savasse (Southbound); Aire du Roubion (Northbound)		
Auvergne-Rhône-Alpes	Drôme	Aire de Montélimar		
Auvergne-Rhône-Alpes	Drôme	18 : Montélimar - sud	Montélimar, Le Puy-en-Velay, Aubenas, Valréas, Nyons, Pierrelatte	
Auvergne-Rhône-Alpes	Drôme	Aire de Pierrelatte (Southbound); Aire de Donzère (Northbound)		
Auvergne-Rhône-Alpes	Drôme	Aire de Tricastin (Northbound)		
Provence-Alpes-Côte d'Azur	Vaucluse	19 : Bollène	Bollène, Alès, Pont-Saint-Esprit, Vaison-la-Romaine	
Provence-Alpes-Côte d'Azur	Vaucluse	Aire de Mornas-Village (Southbound); Aire de Mornas-les-Adrets (Northbound)		
Provence-Alpes-Côte d'Azur	Vaucluse	20 : Orange - nord	Piolenc, Mondragon, Pont-Saint-Esprit	
Provence-Alpes-Côte d'Azur	Vaucluse	A9 - A7	Nîmes, Montpellier, Perpignan, Barcelone, Toulouse (A61)	Entry and exit from Lyon
Provence-Alpes-Côte d'Azur	Vaucluse	E15 / A 7 becomes E714 / A 7		
Provence-Alpes-Côte d'Azur	Vaucluse	21 : Orange - centre	Orange, Caderousse, Valréas, Nyons, Nîmes (A9)	
Provence-Alpes-Côte d'Azur	Vaucluse	Aire de Orange-Le Grès (Southbound); Aire de Orange-Le Coudoulet (Northbound)		
Provence-Alpes-Côte d'Azur	Vaucluse	22 : Orange - sud	Orange, Carpentras, Sarrians, Courthezon, Vaison-la-Romaine	
Provence-Alpes-Côte d'Azur	Vaucluse	Aire du Fournalet (Southbound); Aire de Sorgues (Northbound)		
Provence-Alpes-Côte d'Azur	Vaucluse	23 : Avignon - nord	Avignon, Le Pontet, Sorgues, Vedène, Carpentras	
Provence-Alpes-Côte d'Azur	Vaucluse	Aire de Morières (Southbound)		
Provence-Alpes-Côte d'Azur	Vaucluse	24 : Avignon - sud	Avignon, Apt, Aéroport d'Avignon–Provence, L'Isle-sur-la-Sorgue, Châteaurenard	
Provence-Alpes-Côte d'Azur	Bouches-du-Rhône	Aire de Cabannes (Southbound); Aire de Noves (Northbound)		
Provence-Alpes-Côte d'Azur	Bouches-du-Rhône	Aire de Cavaillon		
Provence-Alpes-Côte d'Azur	Bouches-du-Rhône	25 : Cavaillon	Cavaillon, Arles, Beaucaire, Saint-Rémy-de-Provence, Tarascon, Apt, L'Isle-sur-la-Sorgue	
Provence-Alpes-Côte d'Azur	Bouches-du-Rhône	Aire de Sénas		
Provence-Alpes-Côte d'Azur	Bouches-du-Rhône	26 : Sénas	Sénas, Lambesc, Aix-en-Provence	
Provence-Alpes-Côte d'Azur	Bouches-du-Rhône	27 : Salon-de-Provence - nord	Salon-de-Provence	
Provence-Alpes-Côte d'Azur	Bouches-du-Rhône	Aire de Lamanon (Northbound)		
Provence-Alpes-Côte d'Azur	Bouches-du-Rhône	A54 - A7	Salon-de-Provence - centre, Arles, Nîmes, Barcelone (A9), Fos - Martigues	
Provence-Alpes-Côte d'Azur	Bouches-du-Rhône	E714 / A 7 becomes E80 / E714 / A 7		
Provence-Alpes-Côte d'Azur	Bouches-du-Rhône	Péage de Lançon de Provence		
Provence-Alpes-Côte d'Azur	Bouches-du-Rhône	Aire de Lançon de Provence		
Provence-Alpes-Côte d'Azur	Bouches-du-Rhône	A8 - A7	Aix-en-Provence, Toulon (A52), Nice	
Provence-Alpes-Côte d'Azur	Bouches-du-Rhône	E80 / E714 / A 7 becomes again E714 / A 7		
Provence-Alpes-Côte d'Azur	Bouches-du-Rhône	28 : Rognac - Berre	Rognac, La Fare-les-Oliviers, Berre-l'Étang, Salon-de-Provence	
Provence-Alpes-Côte d'Azur	Bouches-du-Rhône	29 : Vitrolles - Roucas	Vitrolles - centre	
Provence-Alpes-Côte d'Azur	Bouches-du-Rhône	Aire de Vitrolles (Northbound)		
Provence-Alpes-Côte d'Azur	Bouches-du-Rhône	30/30a/30b : Marignane	Marignane - Ville, Aix-en-Provence, Marseille-Provence (Marignane), Saint-Victoret, Vitrolles - sud, Les Pennes-Mirabeau	
Provence-Alpes-Côte d'Azur	Bouches-du-Rhône	A55 - A7	Arles, Fos - Martigues, Nîmes, Marseille - Vieux-Port, L'Estaque, Port de Marseille	
Provence-Alpes-Côte d'Azur	Bouches-du-Rhône	31 : Les Pennes-Mirabeau	Les Pennes-Mirabeau, Plan de Campagne	
Provence-Alpes-Côte d'Azur	Bouches-du-Rhône	A51 - A7	Aix-en-Provence, Nice (A8), Gap, Gardanne, Septèmes-les-Vallons, Plan de Campagne	
Provence-Alpes-Côte d'Azur	Bouches-du-Rhône	E714 / A 7 becomes E712 / E714 / A 7		
Provence-Alpes-Côte d'Azur	Bouches-du-Rhône	32 : Saint-Antoine	Marseille, Septèmes-les-Vallons, Hôpital Nord	
Provence-Alpes-Côte d'Azur	Bouches-du-Rhône	33 : Les Aygalades	Marseille	Entry and exit from Lyon
Provence-Alpes-Côte d'Azur	Bouches-du-Rhône	34 : Arnavaux	Marseille - Sainte-Marthe, La Rose (A507)	
Provence-Alpes-Côte d'Azur	Bouches-du-Rhône	A507 - A7	Marseille - La Rose, Saint-Loup, Aubagne, Toulon (A50)	Entry and exit from Lyon
Provence-Alpes-Côte d'Azur	Bouches-du-Rhône	35 : Le Canet	Marseille - Saint-Barthélemy, Port de Marseille	Entry and exit from Lyon
Provence-Alpes-Côte d'Azur	Bouches-du-Rhône	A557 - A7	Marseille - La Joliette, Vieux-Port (A55)	
Provence-Alpes-Côte d'Azur	Bouches-du-Rhône	36 : Plombières	Marseille - Menpenti, Cinq Avenues, Belle de Mai, Saint-Mauront	Entry and exit from Lyon
E712 / E714 / A 7 ends at Marseille - Saint-Charles
1.000 mi = 1.609 km; 1.000 km = 0.621 mi

== Traffic ==
This autoroute is fairly heavy throughout the year. Much of the transit of heavy goods between northern France and the Benelux countries and Germany and the Mediterranean passes through the Rhône valley, and thus along the A7. Traffic is also generated by local transit around the larger cities of the region (Lyon, Vienne, Valence, Orange, Avignon). During holiday periods, traffic is particularly congested, southbound at the beginning of holidays, northbound at the end. The last week-end of July and the first week-end of August are particularly crowded in both directions; jams can occasionally stretch for hundreds of kilometers.

== Future ==
The section of the motorway going through Lyon between La Mulatière and Perrache train station are in the process of being declassified, with the intent of turning this section into an urban boulevard. To compensate, a new motorway, the A44 will be built bypassing Lyon and connecting to the A7.
