= A54 autoroute =

Road in France

Coordinates: 43.639325°N 4.980667°E

A54 autoroute

Route information
- Part of E80
- Maintained by ASF
- Length: 48.4 km (30.1 mi)
- Existed: 1970–present

Major junctions
- West end: E15 / E80 / A 9 in Nîmes

- E80 / N 572 in Arles; E80 / N 113 in Saint-Martin-de-Crau

- East end: E80 / E714 / A 7 in Salon-de-Provence

Location
- Country: France

Highway system
- Roads in France; Autoroutes; Routes nationales

The A54 autoroute is a toll motorway in France managed by ASF and is close to 80 km long. It is part of European route E80.

== Route ==
The motorway connects Salon-de-Provence with Nîmes and merges with the N113 between Saint-Martin-de-Crau and Arles.

== History ==
Its first section was opened south of Salon-de-Provence in 1970, at the same time as the section of the A7 between Sénas and Rognac.

In 1990, the portion between Nîmes and Arles was opened. It was connected to Saint-Martin-de-Crau and Salon-de-Provence in 1996.

== List of exits and junctions ==
Region	Department	Junction	Destinations	Notes
Provence-Alpes-Côte-d'Azur	Gard			
Provence-Alpes-Côte-d'Azur	Gard	A9 - A54 + 25 : Nîmes - ouest (exit of the A9)	Toulouse, Barcelone, Montpellier, Lyon, Avignon, Nîmes - Courbessac	
Provence-Alpes-Côte-d'Azur	Gard	A9 - A54 + 25 : Nîmes - ouest (exit of the A9)	Alès, Nîmes - Saint-Cézaire	
Provence-Alpes-Côte-d'Azur	Gard	1 : Nîmes - centre	Nîmes	
Provence-Alpes-Côte-d'Azur	Gard	Aire de Caissargues (Eastbound); Aire de Nîmes-Costières (Westbound)		
Provence-Alpes-Côte-d'Azur	Gard	2 : Nîmes - Garons	Garons, Saint-Gilles	
Provence-Alpes-Côte-d'Azur	Bouches-du-Rhône	Péage d'Arles		
Provence-Alpes-Côte-d'Azur	Bouches-du-Rhône	E80 / A 54 becomes E80 / N 572		
Provence-Alpes-Côte-d'Azur	Bouches-du-Rhône	3 : Saint-Gilles ( RD 572^{N} - RN 572)	Montpellier, Vauvert, Saint-Gilles	
Provence-Alpes-Côte-d'Azur	Bouches-du-Rhône	4 : Arles - Trinquetailles	Nîmes, Bellegarde, Arles, Salin-de-Giraud, Saintes-Maries-de-la-Mer	
Provence-Alpes-Côte-d'Azur	Bouches-du-Rhône	E80 / N 572 becomes E80 / N 113		
Provence-Alpes-Côte-d'Azur	Bouches-du-Rhône	5 : Arles - centre	Arles - Barriol, Port-Saint-Louis-du-Rhône	
Provence-Alpes-Côte-d'Azur	Bouches-du-Rhône	6 : Arles - Fourchon	Arles - Alyscamps, Centre hospitalier J. Imbert, Pont-de-Crau	
Provence-Alpes-Côte-d'Azur	Bouches-du-Rhône	7 : Pont-de-Crau	Avignon, Tarascon, Beaucaire, Arles, Z. I. Port	
Provence-Alpes-Côte-d'Azur	Bouches-du-Rhône	Aire des Cantarelles (Eastbound)		
Provence-Alpes-Côte-d'Azur	Bouches-du-Rhône	8 : Raphèle-lès-Arles	Moulès, Raphèle-lès-Arles	
Provence-Alpes-Côte-d'Azur	Bouches-du-Rhône	9 : Fos-sur-Mer ( RN 568 - RN 113)	Marseille (A55), Fos - Martigues	
Provence-Alpes-Côte-d'Azur	Bouches-du-Rhône	10 : Saint-Martin-de-Crau - ouest	Saint-Martin-de-Crau	
Provence-Alpes-Côte-d'Azur	Bouches-du-Rhône	11 : Saint-Martin-de-Crau - Z. I.	La Cadière-d'Azur, Le Beausset, Circuit du Castellet, Z. I. Signes	
Provence-Alpes-Côte-d'Azur	Bouches-du-Rhône	12 : Saint-Martin-de-Crau - est	Salon-de-Provence par RD, Istres, Miramas, Saint-Martin-de-Crau	
Provence-Alpes-Côte-d'Azur	Bouches-du-Rhône	E80 / N 113 becomes again E80 / A 54		
Provence-Alpes-Côte-d'Azur	Bouches-du-Rhône	Péage de Saint-Martin-de-Crau		
Provence-Alpes-Côte-d'Azur	Bouches-du-Rhône	Aire du Merle		
Provence-Alpes-Côte-d'Azur	Bouches-du-Rhône	13 : Salon - ouest	Salon-de-Provence, Fos-sur-Mer, Martigues, Istres, Les Baux-de-Provence, Eyguières, Miramas, Grans	
Provence-Alpes-Côte-d'Azur	Bouches-du-Rhône	14 : Grans	Salon-de-Provence - sud, Grans, La Fare-les-Oliviers, Lançon-Provence	
Provence-Alpes-Côte-d'Azur	Bouches-du-Rhône	15 : Salon - centre	Salon-de-Provence, Pélissanne	
Provence-Alpes-Côte-d'Azur	Bouches-du-Rhône	A7 - A54	Nice, Aix-en-Provence (A8), Toulon (A52), Marseille, Marignane	
Provence-Alpes-Côte-d'Azur	Bouches-du-Rhône	A7 - A54	Lyon, Avignon, Cavaillon	
1.000 mi = 1.609 km; 1.000 km = 0.621 mi

== Future ==
A new motorway is proposed skirting Arles, ensuring the continuity of A54. This would be an upgrade of the existing N113 and N572 south of Arles to autoroute standard and is known as the Contournement d'Arles or Arles bypass. This 24 km section is the final non-motorway section in an important transcontinental road link between Italy and Spain and is currently scheduled for 2021.
