= Autoroute du Soleil =

Autoroute du Soleil may refer to:

- A6 autoroute (France)
- A7 autoroute (France)
