= European route E35 in Italy =

Major junctions
- North end: E35 at Switzerland border
- South end: Rome

Location
- Country: Italy

Highway system
- Roads in Italy; Autostrade; State; Regional; Provincial; Municipal

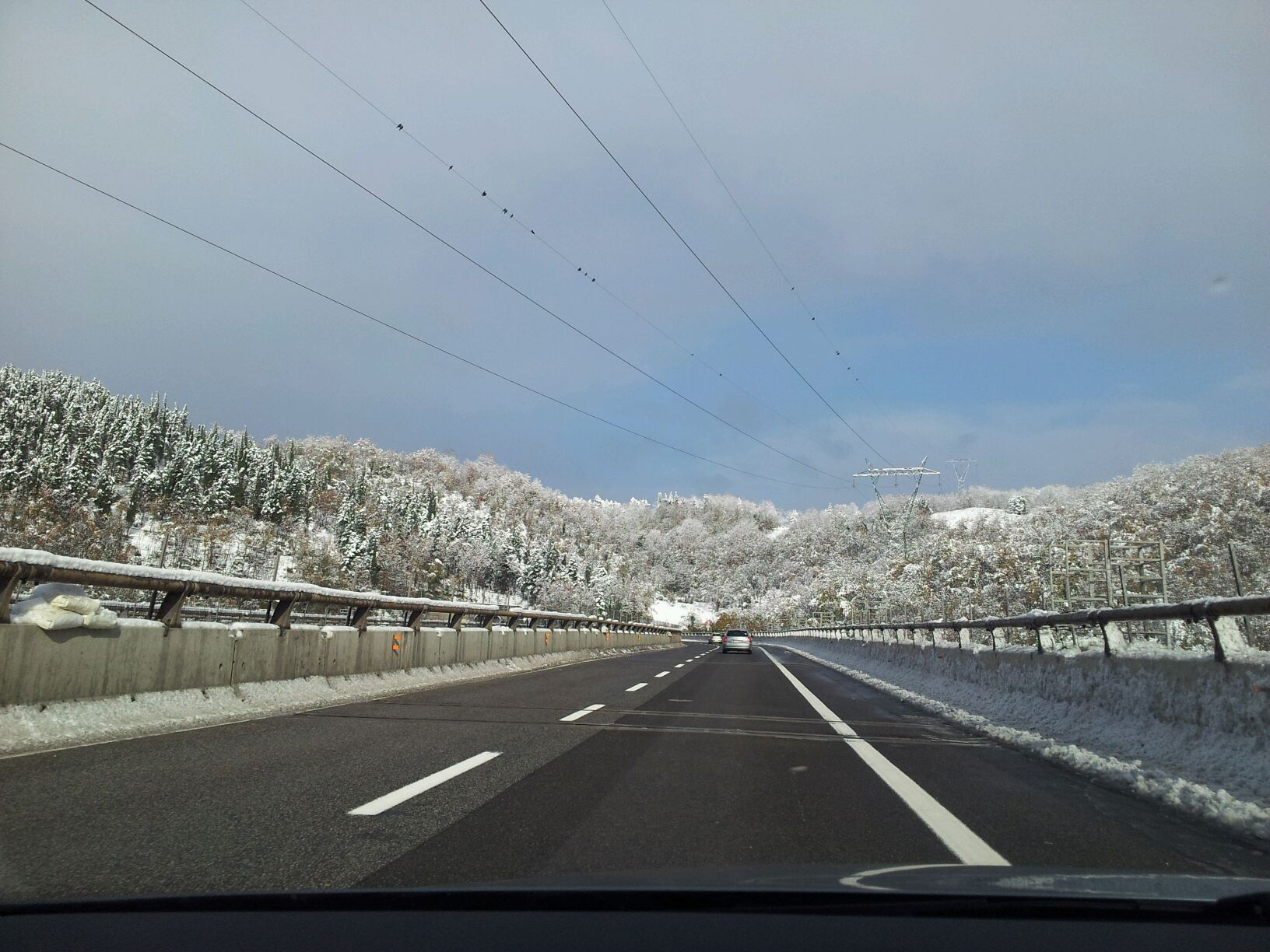
European route 35 near Barberino di Mugello.

European route E 35 (E 35) is a north–south European route, running from Amsterdam in the Netherlands to Rome in Italy. In Italy, the highway runs from the Swiss border near Como, to its southern terminus in Rome.

== See also ==
European route E35
Previous country: Switzerland	Italy	Next country: Terminus
