= A9 autoroute =

Road in France

A9 autoroute
- La Languedocienne; La Catalane

Route information
- Part of E15 E80
- Maintained by ASF
- Length: 280.5 km (174.3 mi)
- Existed: 1967–present

Major junctions
- East end: E15 / E714 / A 7 in Orange

- E80 / A 54 in Nîmes; A 709 in Montpellier; E11 / A 75 in Béziers; E80 / A 61 in Narbonne

- West end: E15 / AP-7 at Spanish border at Le Perthus

Location
- Country: France

Highway system
- Roads in France; Autoroutes; Routes nationales

The A9 autoroute (La Languedocienne/La Catalane) is a motorway in Southern France.

The road forms part of the European route E15, as does the A9 road (Scotland). The road runs between Orange and Perthus, in the Pyrénées-Orientales at the frontier with Spain where it becomes the Autopista AP-7.

The route passes the following major towns and cities Perpignan (Pyrénées-Orientales), Narbonne (Aude), Béziers and Montpellier (Hérault), Nîmes (Gard) and Orange (Vaucluse) before joining the A7 autoroute (Marseille to Lyon). The route is 2x3 as far south as exit 41 (Perpignan-Nord). The widening between exit 41 and the Spanish frontier was done in 2019.

The A9 autoroute was operated by the Autoroutes du Sud de la France (ASF), taken over in 2006 by Vinci Autoroutes. The cost of travelling the whole road through the Occitanie region in a car is 31.70 euros (from 1 February 2025).

== Montpellier ==
Around Montpellier the road splits into the A9 and the A709, the latter of which is toll-free. Exits 28 to 32 (inclusive) of the A9 can be reached only from the A709. If one accidentally stays on the A9, the distance can be up to 35 km to the next exit.

== Lists of junctions and exits ==
=== A9 ===
Name	Region	Department	km	mi	Junctions	Destinations	Notes
La Languedocienne	Provence-Alpes-Côte d'Azur	Vaucluse	0,0	0.0	A7 - A9 + 21 : Orange - centre	Lyon, Valence, Montélimar	
La Languedocienne	Provence-Alpes-Côte d'Azur	Vaucluse	0,0	0.0	A7 - A9 + 21 : Orange - centre	Marseille (A7), Carpentras, Orange, Vaison-la-Romaine	
La Languedocienne	Occitanie	Gard					
La Languedocienne	Occitanie	Gard	Aire de Roquemaure				
La Languedocienne	Occitanie	Gard	14,1	8.76	22 : Roquemore	Avignon, Villeneuve-lès-Avignon, Roquemaure, Laudun-l'Ardoise, Bagnols-sur-Cèze, Marcoule	
La Languedocienne	Occitanie	Gard	Aire de Tavel				
La Languedocienne	Occitanie	Gard	Aire d'Estézargues				
La Languedocienne	Occitanie	Gard	29	18.0	23 : Remoulins	Uzès, Remoulins, Beaucaire - Tarascon, Avignon, Pont du Gard	
La Languedocienne	Occitanie	Gard	Aire de Lédenon				
La Languedocienne	Occitanie	Gard	Aire de Nîmes-Marguerittes				
La Languedocienne	Occitanie	Gard	46,3	28.76	24 : Nîmes - est	Nîmes - centre, Courbessac, Marguerittes, Beaucaire - Tarascon	Entry and exit only from Paris
La Languedocienne	Occitanie	Gard	54,6	33.9	25 : Nîmes - ouest A54 - A9	Nîmes - Saint-Cézaire, Alès	
La Languedocienne	Occitanie	Gard	54,6	33.9	25 : Nîmes - ouest A54 - A9	Marseille, Arles, Aix-en-Provence (A8), Garons	
La Languedocienne	Occitanie	Gard	E15 / A 9 becomes E15 / E80 / A 9				
La Languedocienne	Occitanie	Gard	Aire de Milhaud				
La Languedocienne	Occitanie	Gard	Aire de Vergèze				
La Languedocienne	Occitanie	Gard	71	44.1	26 : Gallargues	Vauvert, Aigues-Mortes, Le Grau-du-Roi, Gallargues-le-Montueux	
La Languedocienne	Occitanie	Hérault	Aire d’Ambrussum				
La Languedocienne	Occitanie	Hérault	78,4	48.4	27 : Lunel	La Grande-Motte, Lunel, Sommières	
La Languedocienne	Occitanie	Hérault	Aire de Nabrigas (Westbound)				
La Languedocienne	Occitanie	Hérault	86	53.43	A709 - A9	Montpellier, Clermont-Ferrand (A75 - A750), Méditerranée	Exit and entry from Orange
La Languedocienne	Occitanie	Hérault	109	67.72	A709 - A9	Montpellier, Méditerranée	Exit and entry from Spain
La Languedocienne	Occitanie	Hérault	Aire de Montpellier-Fabrègues				
La Languedocienne	Occitanie	Hérault	Aire de Gigean				
La Languedocienne	Occitanie	Hérault	132	82.0	33 : Sète	Sète, Mèze, Balaruc-le-Vieux, Frontignan	
La Languedocienne	Occitanie	Hérault	Aire de Loupian-Georges Brassens (Eastbound)				
La Languedocienne	Occitanie	Hérault	Aire de Mèze (Westbound)				
La Languedocienne	Occitanie	Hérault	Aire de Florensac				
La Languedocienne	Occitanie	Hérault	155	96.3	34 : Agde - Pézenas	Agde, Pézenas, Bessan, Vias	
La Languedocienne	Occitanie	Hérault	Aire de Béziers- Montblanc				
La Languedocienne	Occitanie	Hérault	166	103.1	A75 - A9	Clermont-Ferrand, Millau, Béziers - centre, Valras-Plage	
La Languedocienne	Occitanie	Hérault	173	107.4	36 : Béziers - ouest	Béziers, Vendres, Castres, Mazamet	
La Languedocienne	Occitanie	Hérault	Aire de Lespignan				
La Languedocienne	Occitanie	Aude					
La Languedocienne	Occitanie	Aude	Aire de Narbonne-Vinassan				
La Languedocienne	Occitanie	Aude	194	120.5	37 : Narbonne - est	Narbonne, Narbonne-Plage, Gruissan	
La Languedocienne	Occitanie	Aude	198	123.0	38 : Narbonne - sud	Narbonne, Carcassonne, Béziers, Perpignan par RD	
La Languedocienne	Occitanie	Aude	200	124.2	A61 - A9	Bordeaux, Toulouse, Carcassonne	
La Languedocienne	Occitanie	Aude	E15 / E80 / A 9 becomes E15 / A 9				
La Catalane	Occitanie	Aude	Aire de Prat-de-Cest (Westbound); Aire de Bages (Eastbound)				
La Catalane	Occitanie	Aude	215	133.5	39 : Sigean	Sigean, Port-la-Nouvelle	
La Catalane	Occitanie	Aude	Aire de Gasparets (Westbound); Aire de Sigean (Eastbound)				
La Catalane	Occitanie	Aude	Aire de La Palme				
La Catalane	Occitanie	Aude	226	140.4	40 : Leucate	Caves, Leucate, Port Leucate, La Palme, Salses-le-Château	
La Catalane	Occitanie	Aude	Aire de Fitou				
La Catalane	Occitanie	Pyrénées-Orientales					
La Catalane	Occitanie	Pyrénées-Orientales	Aire du Château de Salses				
La Catalane	Occitanie	Pyrénées-Orientales	248	154.1	41 : Perpignan - nord	Perpignan - centre, Rivesaltes, Canet-en-Roussillon, Le Barcarès, Perpignan–Rivesaltes Airport, Sales-le-Château	
La Catalane	Occitanie	Pyrénées-Orientales	Aire de Rivesaltes (Westbound); Aire de Pia (Eastbound)				
La Catalane	Occitanie	Pyrénées-Orientales	256	159.0	42 : Perpignan - sud	Perpignan - centre, Saint-Charles International, Prades, Thuir, Canet-en-Roussillon, Bourg-Madame, Andorra la Vella (Andorra)	
La Catalane	Occitanie	Pyrénées-Orientales	Aire des Pavillons				
La Catalane	Occitanie	Pyrénées-Orientales	Aire du Village Catalan				
La Catalane	Occitanie	Pyrénées-Orientales	275	108.7	43 : Le Boulou	Le Boulou, Argelès-sur-Mer, Céret, Le Perthus, Port-Vendres	
French - Spain Border ; E15 / A 9 becomes E15 / AP-7 (A7)
1.000 mi = 1.609 km; 1.000 km = 0.621 mi

=== A709 ===
Region	Department	km	mi	Junctions	Destinations	Notes
Occitanie	Hérault					
Occitanie	Hérault	0,0	0.0	A9 - A709	Nîmes, Lyon, Marseille, Alès, Arles	Exit and entry from A9 nord
Occitanie	Hérault	Péage de Baillargues (Montpellier 1)				
Occitanie	Hérault	3,3	2.05	28 : Vendargues	Montpellier - Hôpitaux Facultés, Vendargues, Le Crès, Castelnau-le-Lez, Mauguio, Baillargues, Alès, Nîmes	
Occitanie	Hérault	10,5	6.52	29 : Montpellier - est	Montpellier - centre, Millénaire, Aéroport Montpellier–Méditerranée, La Grande-Motte, Carnon-Plage	
Occitanie	Hérault	14,5	9.00	30 : Montpellier - sud	Palavas-les-Flots, Lattes Prés d'Arènes,	
Occitanie	Hérault	16,6	10,3	31 : Montpellier - ouest	Montpellier - Croix d'Argent	
Occitanie	Hérault	20	12.42	32 : Saint-Jean-de-Védas	Saint-Jean-de-Védas, Montpellier - Mosson, Clermont-Ferrand, Millau (A75 - A750)	
Occitanie	Hérault	Péage de Saint-Jean-de-Védas (Montpellier 2)				
Occitanie	Hérault	23	14.29	A9 - A709	Barcelone, Perpignan, Toulouse, Sète, Béziers	Exit and entry from A9 sud
1.000 mi = 1.609 km; 1.000 km = 0.621 mi

== Gallery ==
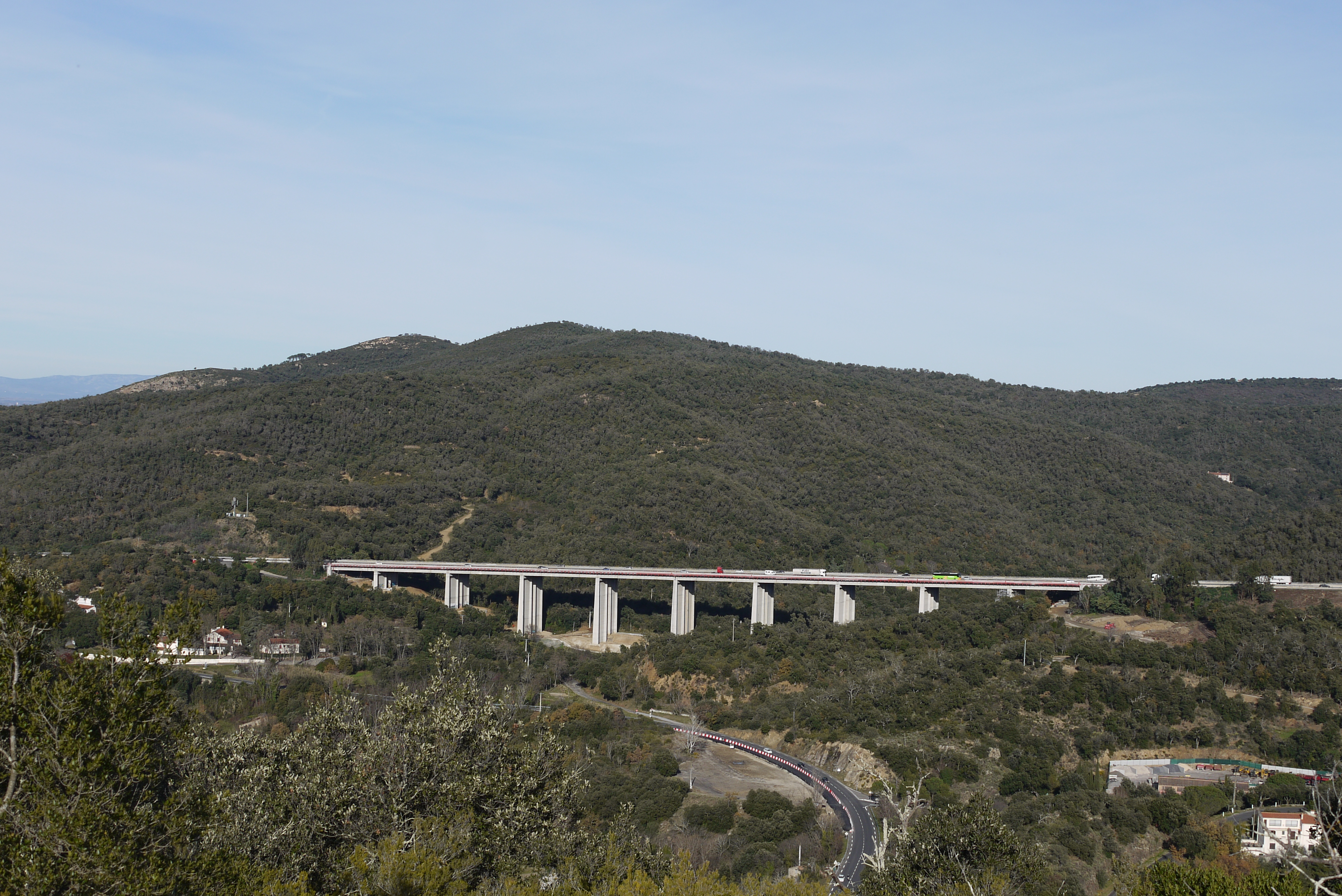
The A9 in Pyrénées-Orientales

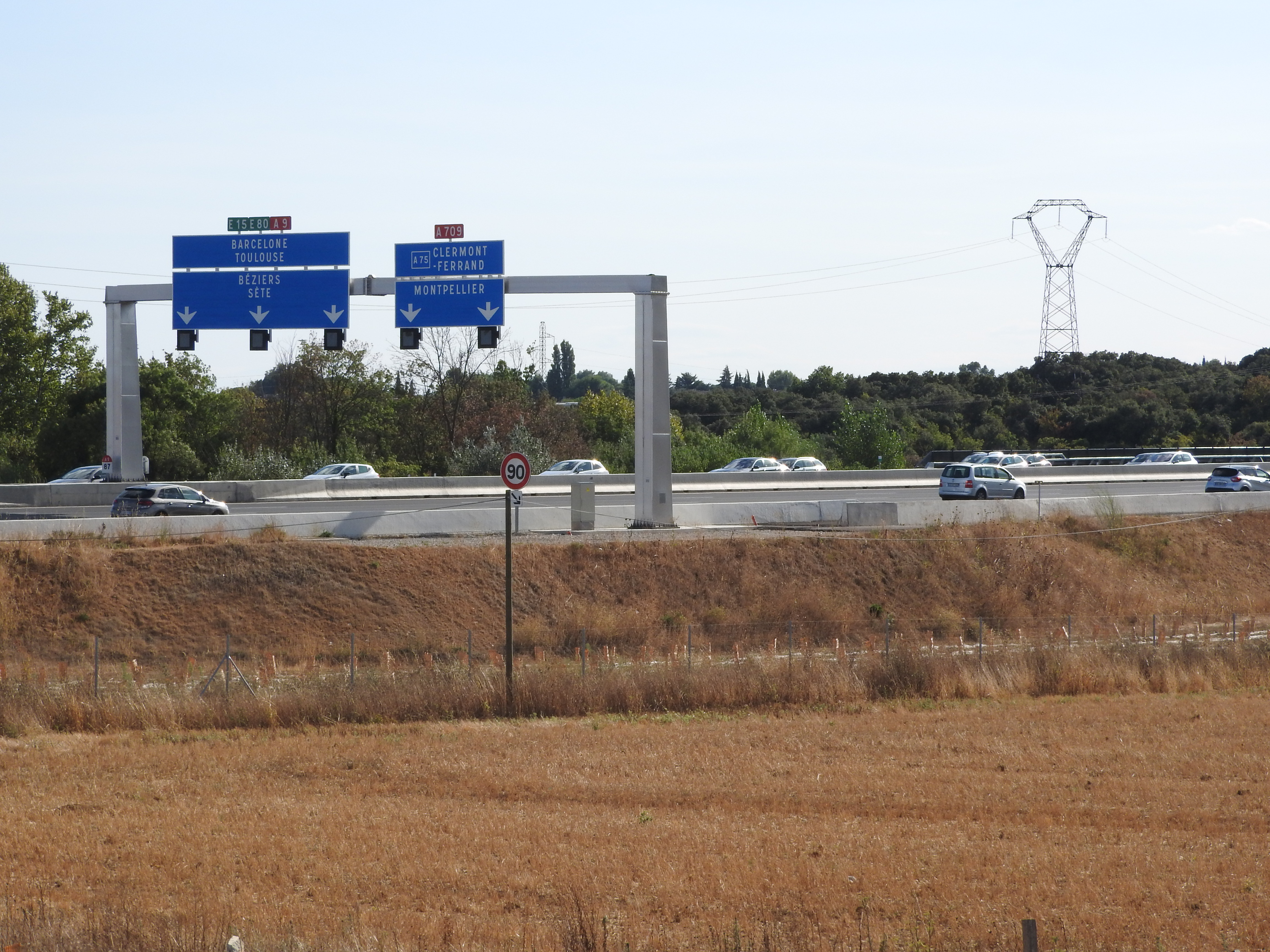
The A9 in Hérault

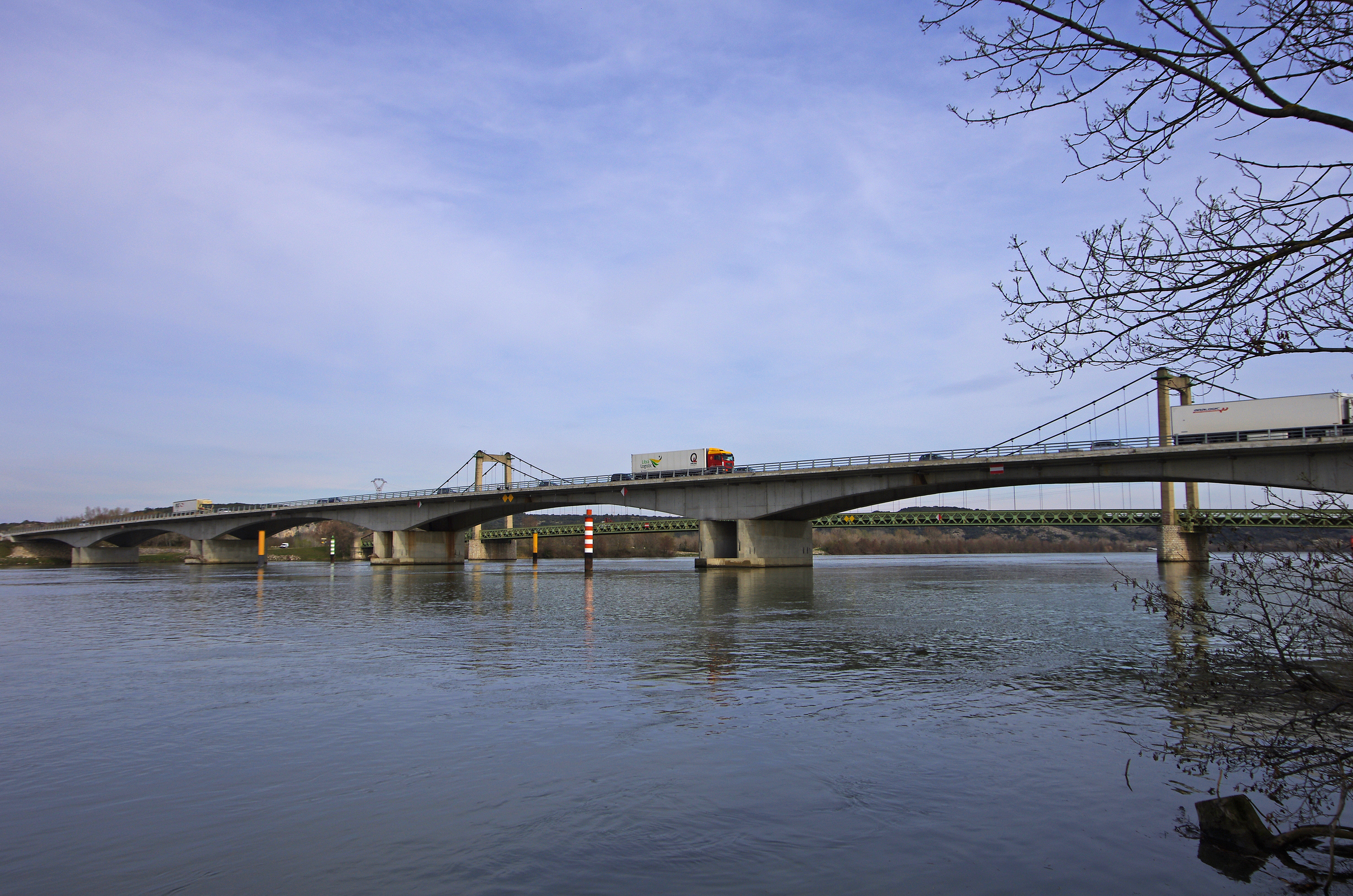
The A9 in Gard
