= European route E531 =

Road in trans-European E-road network

E531

Route information
- Length: 89 km (55 mi)

Major junctions
- From: Offenburg
- To: Donaueschingen

Location
- Countries: Germany

Highway system
- International E-road network; A Class; B Class

The E531 is a B-class road of the trans-European International E-road network in Germany, connecting the cities of Offenburg and Donaueschingen.

== Route and E-road junctions ==
- Germany (via shared signage B33a then B33)
  - Offenburg: E35
  - Villingen-Schwenningen
  - Bad Dürrheim
  - Donaueschingen
