= European route E773 =

Road in trans-European E-road network

E773

Route information
- Length: 273 km (170 mi)

Major junctions
- From: Plovdiv
- Stara Zagora
- To: Burgas

Location
- Countries: Bulgaria

Highway system
- International E-road network; A Class; B Class

European route E 773 is a European B class road in Bulgaria, connecting the village of Popovica and the cities of Stara Zagora and Burgas.

== Route ==
- Bulgaria
  - A 1: Chirpan ( E80) - Stara Zagora ( E85) - Burgas
  - I-6: Burgas ( E87)

== See also ==
- Roads in Bulgaria
- Highways in Bulgaria
