= European route E821 =

Road in trans-European E-road network

E821

Route information
- Length: 36 km (22 mi)

Major junctions
- From: Rome
- To: San Cesareo

Location
- Countries: Italy

Highway system
- International E-road network; A Class; B Class

European route E 821 is a European B class road in Italy, connecting the cities Rome – San Cesareo.

== Route ==
- Italy
  - E35, E80 Rome
  - E45 San Cesareo
