= European route E840 =

Road in trans-European E-road network

E840

Route information
- Length: 337 km (209 mi)

Major junctions
- From: Sassari
- Olbia
- To: Civitavecchia

Location
- Countries: Italy

Highway system
- International E-road network; A Class; B Class

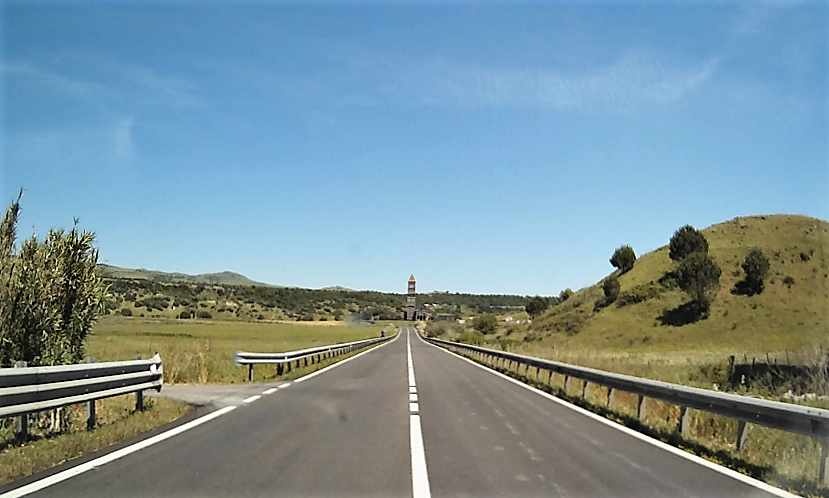
European route 840 near Codrongianos.

European route E 840 is a European B-class road in Italy, connecting the cities Sassari in Sardinia to Tarquinia in mainland Italy where it connects to E80.

== Route ==
- Italy
  - E25 Sassari
  - Olbia
  - gap across the Tyrrhenian Sea
  - Civitavecchia
  - E80 Tarquinia
