= European route E806 =

Road in trans-European E-road network

E806

Route information
- Length: 209 km (130 mi)

Major junctions
- From: Torres Novas
- Castelo Branco
- To: Guarda

Location
- Countries: Portugal

Highway system
- International E-road network; A Class; B Class

European route E 806 is a European B class road in Portugal, connecting the cities Torres Novas – Guarda.

== Route ==
- Portugal
  - Torres Novas
  - Castelo Branco
  - E801 Guarda
