= European route E15 =

Road in trans-European E-road network

Coordinates: 42°25′28″N 2°51′57″E

E15

Major junctions
- North end: Inverness, United Kingdom
- South end: Algeciras, Spain

Location
- Countries: United Kingdom, France, Spain

Highway system
- International E-road network; A Class; B Class

The European route E15 is part of the United Nations international E-road network. It is a north–south "reference road", running from Inverness, Scotland south through England and France to Algeciras, Spain. Along most of its route between Paris and London, the road parallels the LGV Nord (as the French A1 autoroute) and High Speed 1 (as the English M20 motorway). Its length is 2,300 miles (3,700 km).

== Features ==
The E15 has a gap at the English Channel between Dover and Calais, France. There is a ferry link between Dover and Calais. The Eurotunnel Shuttle (using the Channel Tunnel) provides an alternative link via Folkestone.

The roads in the UK are signed solely by the local number (e.g. M20).

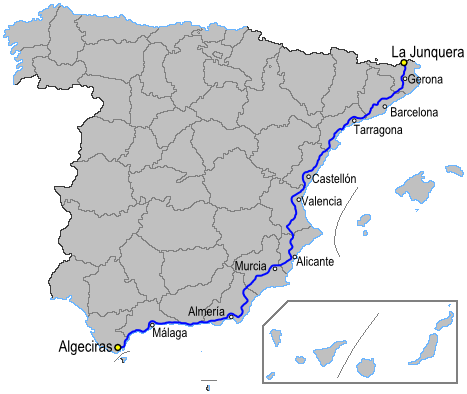
The Autovía A-7 part of the E15 in Spain

== Route ==
- United Kingdom
  - A9: Inverness - Perth
  - M90: Perth - M9
  - M9: M90 - M8 (Interchange with E16)
  - M8: Edinburgh
  - A720: Edinburgh City Bypass
  - A1: Edinburgh - Gateshead (Interchange with E18 at A69 Newcastle upon Tyne)
  - A1(M): Gateshead - Pontefract (Interchange with E20 and E22 at M62)
  - A1: Pontefract - Doncaster
  - A1(M): Doncaster Bypass (Interchange with E13 at M18)
  - A1: Doncaster - Peterborough
  - A1(M): Peterborough - Huntingdon (Interchange with E24 at A14)
  - A1: Huntingdon - Stevenage
  - A1(M): Stevenage - M25
  - M25: London Orbital (Multiplex with E30 between A1(M) and A12)
  - A282: Dartford Crossing (Charge)
  - M25: London Orbital
  - M20: Channel Tunnel
- Gap (English Channel)
  - : (United Kingdom) Folkestone - (France) Calais
- France
  - A 16: Calais (E 40 E 402)
  - A 26: Calais (E 40) - Arras (E 17)
  - A 1: Arras (E 17) - Combles (Start of concurrency with E 19) - Chaulnes (E 44) - Compiègne (E 46) - Roissy-en-France (End of concurrency with E 19)
  - A 3: Roissy-en-France (E 19) - Paris
  - Boulevard Périphérique: Paris (E 50 E 54)
  - A 6b: Paris (E 50) - Massy (E 5 E 50)
  - A 6: Massy (E 5 E 50) - Courtenay (E 511, Start of concurrency with E 60) - Auxerre - Beaune (End of concurrency with E 60, Start of concurrency with E 21) - Chalon-sur-Saône (E 607) - Mâcon (E 62, End of concurrency with E 21) - Anse
  - A 46: Anse - Vaulx-en-Velin (E 611)
  - N 346: Vaulx-en-Velin (E 611) - Saint-Priest (E 70 E 711)
  - A 46: Saint-Priest (E 70 E 711) - Givors (E 70)
  - A 7: Givors (E 70) - Valence (E 713) - Orange (E 714)
  - A 9: Orange (E 714) - Nîmes (Start of concurrency with E 80) - Montpellier - Béziers (E 11) - Narbonne (End of concurrency with E 80) - Perpignan - Le Boulou
- Spain
  - AP-7: La Jonquera - Girona - Rubí (E-9) - Rubí (Start of concurrency with E-90) - El Vendrell (End of concurrency with E-90) - Tarragona - Castelló de la Plana - València (E-901) - Alacant(E-903) - Crevillent
  - A-7: Crevillent - Murcia - Motril (E-902) - Málaga
  - AP-7: Málaga - Guadiaro
  - A-7: Guadiaro - Algeciras (E-5)
