= Les Granettes =

Coordinates: 5°23′36″N 43°32′15″E

Les Granettes (French pronunciation: [le ɡʁanɛt]) is a hamlet close to Aix-en-Provence in France.

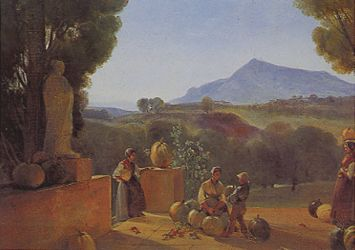
François-Marius Granet, La récolte des citrouilles à la Bastide de Malvallat, 1796

== Overview ==
There is a primary school. The hamlet is also home to a vineyard, Château La Bougerelle.

In 2011, residents complained about new constructions, including a roundabout, a carpark and block of flats, to the detriment of an old farm and century-old Mediterranean Cypress trees.

== Notable residents ==
- François Marius Granet.
- Alexander Calder in 1953.
- In 1954, Sam Francis rented the Mas des Roches with philosopher Rachel Jacobs and invited David Gascoyne.
