= Port of Pescara =

Port of Pescara Porto di Pescara
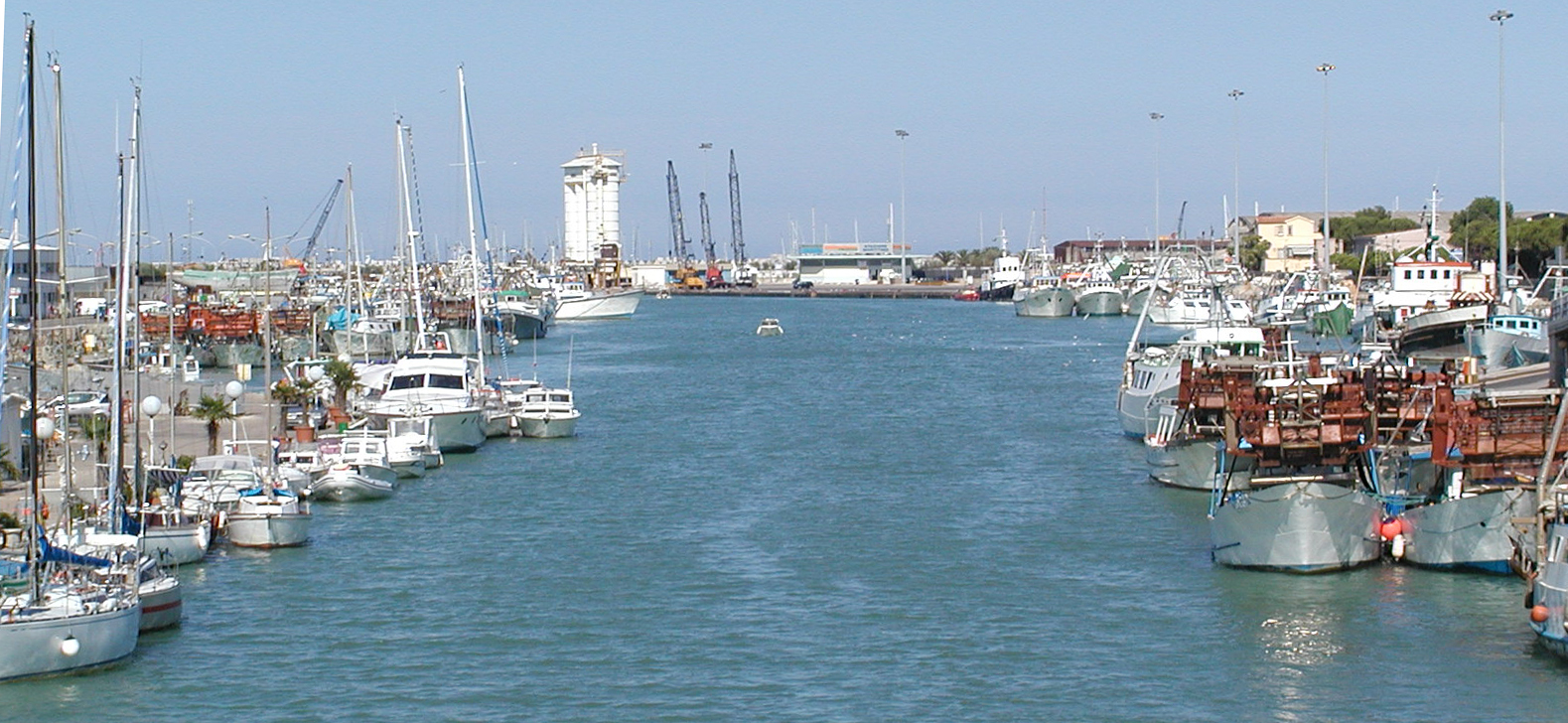

- Location in Abruzzo
- Native name: Port of Pescara

Location
- Country: Italy
- Location: Pescara, Abruzzo
- Coordinates: 42°28′05″N 14°13′38″E
- UN/LOCODE: IT PSR

Details
- Type of harbour: Commercial and turistic port
- No. of berths: 950

The port of Pescara is an Italian port on the Adriatic Sea at the mouth of the River Pescara in the city of Pescara.

== History ==
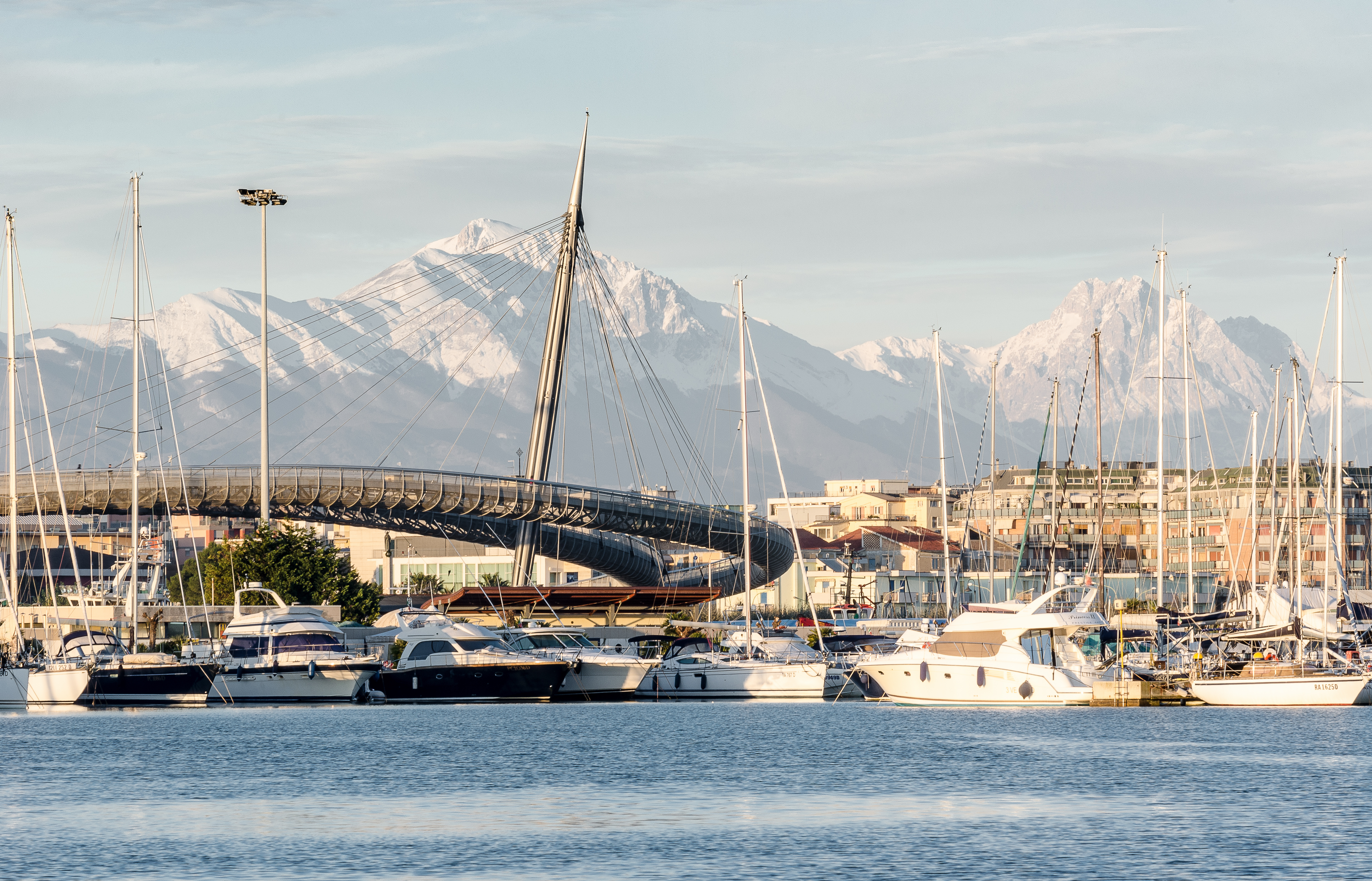
Marina di Pescara

The port of Pescara was conceived mainly as a staging area for use by numerous local fishing fleets, which had laid the foundations in the river in the second half of the 19th century. This project was created at the request of the navy to remedy the low water depths at the mouth of the river and the need to create an entry into deeper water and that was safer. Thus was born the port-channel, with two moles guardians 500 meters north-east, on stilts. Initially the port in Pescara was equipped for small and medium tonnage ships, in addition to providing support to the fishing activities that were already active in the central Adriatic. The port immediately showed signs of development beginning with the economic growth of the city.

During the First World War, the port recorded a setback due to the almost total lack of commercial traffic caused by the presence of the Austrian Navy in the Adriatic. In the period between the two World Wars, the port of Pescara developed considerably in line with the growth of the city, making it the busiest port of Ancona and Bari. During the Second World War, in the spring of 1944, the port was almost completely destroyed by the Germans retreating from the city. In the post-war reconstruction projects, platforms were designed to provide a better commercial port, and backdrops were designed around 5 meters. With the increase of trade, due to the economic boom of those years, the problem became eminent of overly shallow water for vessels of larger tonnage due to siltation and mud carried by the river Pescara. The problem was solved using periodic dredging of the seabed of the port-channel.

In the 1980s, a group of citizen entrepreneurs suggested a municipal plan for a marina with relevant facilities to support recreation and navigation. A modern marina with moorings and advanced shipbuilding facilities was thus born. The port of Pescara has the third greatest number of berths in Italy after Savona and Naples. Since 1990 it has continuously obtained the Blue Flag recognition for the quality of the services offered:

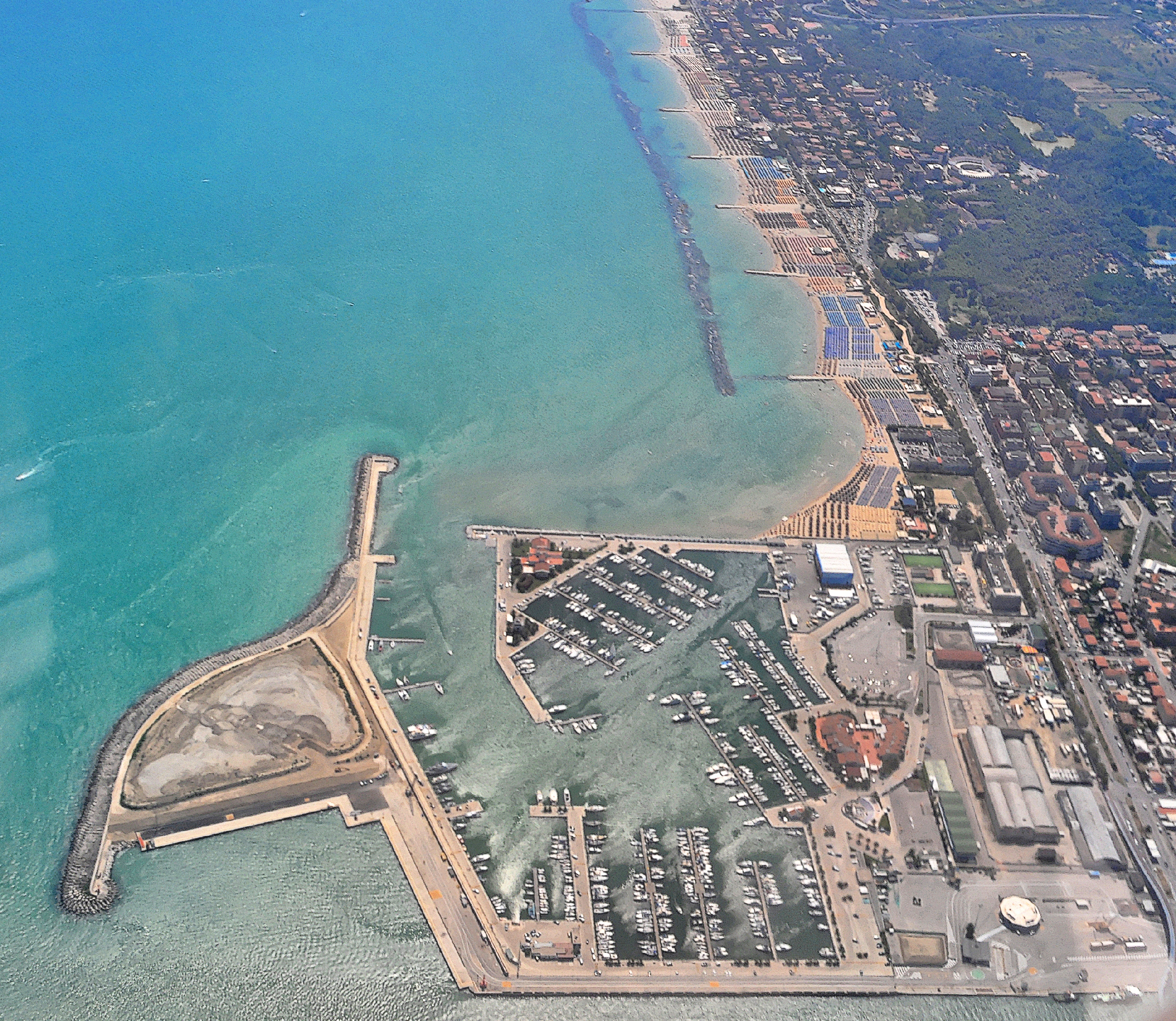
Il porto turistico

- Snack bars, restaurants
- Nautical practical agencies
- Nautical equipment and accessories shops
- Boutique
- Nautical and sailing schools and recreational associations
- Nautical charter and brokerage
- Club House in which the nautical club and the Italian Sailing Federation are located

Every year, the marina organizes entertainment evenings with music and various kinds of shows, such as musical concerts, theatrical performances and film screenings and also other water sports events.

== Activities of the port ==
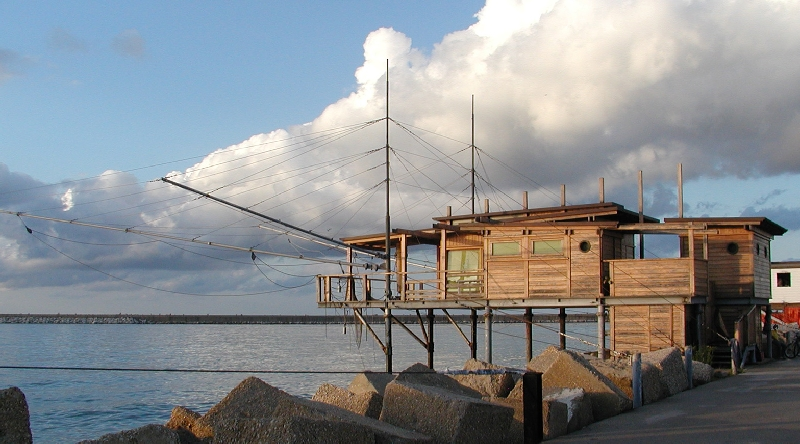
Trabocco

In the harbor one can do the following:

- Fishing: restricted to some parts of north and south shore of the channel
- Boating: reserved to the north quay, in the sections under concession to the "Yacht Club", the "Rowing Club" the Pescarina and the tourist port "Marina di Pescara", placed at the head of the southern mouth of the river.
- Commercial facilities on the south bank of the channel upstream of docking vessels (liquid and solid bulk cargo)
- Passengers: reserved, set periods, to the south bank of the channel and berth destined for motorboats (currently suspended)

== Problems relating to the seabed and destinations ==
Compared to other ports in the Adriatic Sea, the port of Pescara has not been very productive in both tourism and freight due to the problem of the port being too shallow for ships (including tourist) of large tonnage. Another problem is the silting of the river Pescara. The port has had to be dredged repeatedly, an expensive undertaking, and these problems have had repercussions on tourism. The Italian maritime company Snav, which connected the city of Abruzzo with Split in Croatia using small modern hydrofoils, has decided to move to the Port of Ortona, thus depriving the city an important link for maritime tourism.

== Future development and modernization ==
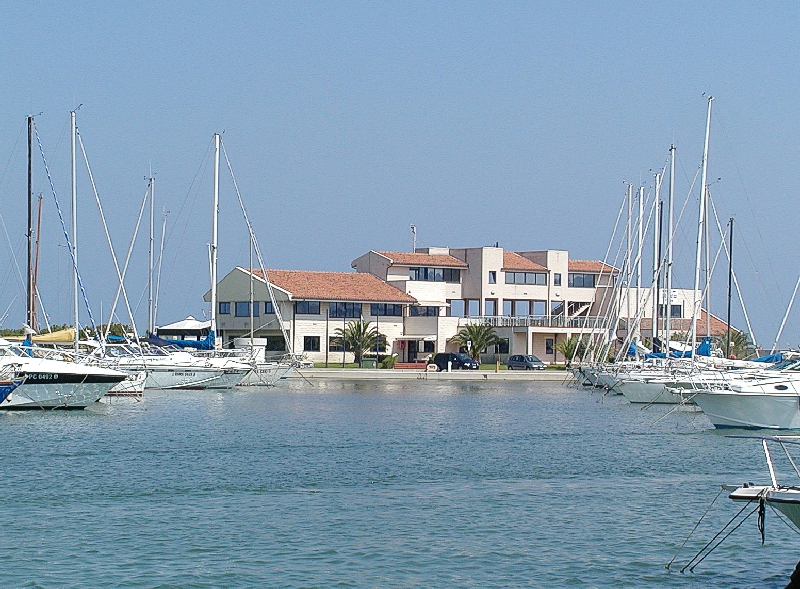
Marina di Pescara

The new Port Regulatory Plan was approved by the Municipality on 25 July 2014, and subsequently approved by the Region in November 2016; according to the project, the following modernization and expansion works of the port will be carried out for a total cost of 60 million euros:

- Breakwater cutting
- The construction of a dock for fishing boats in order to eliminate the current fleet of about 70 fishing boats from the north and south docks of the canal port. The dock will rise within the long arm that will be built on the north side of the canal port, at the same time as the breakdown of the breakwater.
- Construction of new piers (north and south)
- Construction of a brush to protect the new river mouth
- Construction of a submerged cliff that will be the basis for the new northern pier
- The redefinition of the entire surrounding port area (including part of the former Cofa area), by extending the SS 16 dir / C to the maritime station and the widening of the quays, with a greater excavation of the seabed.
- Redevelopment of the light towers, with relative modernization of the lights

The interventions for cutting the breakwater began on November 20, 2017, while the works for the construction of the mouth brush and the elevation of the rooting cliff aimed at the diversion of the Pescara canal port have started in December 2021.

A very important area for the future development of the port is that of the former Cofa fruit and vegetable market, between the tourist port and the south quay of the port-canal, now in disuse; the Pescara Chamber of Commerce has purchased the former Cofa and the adjacent areas, which will have to be recovered and redeveloped.

== Features and technical data ==
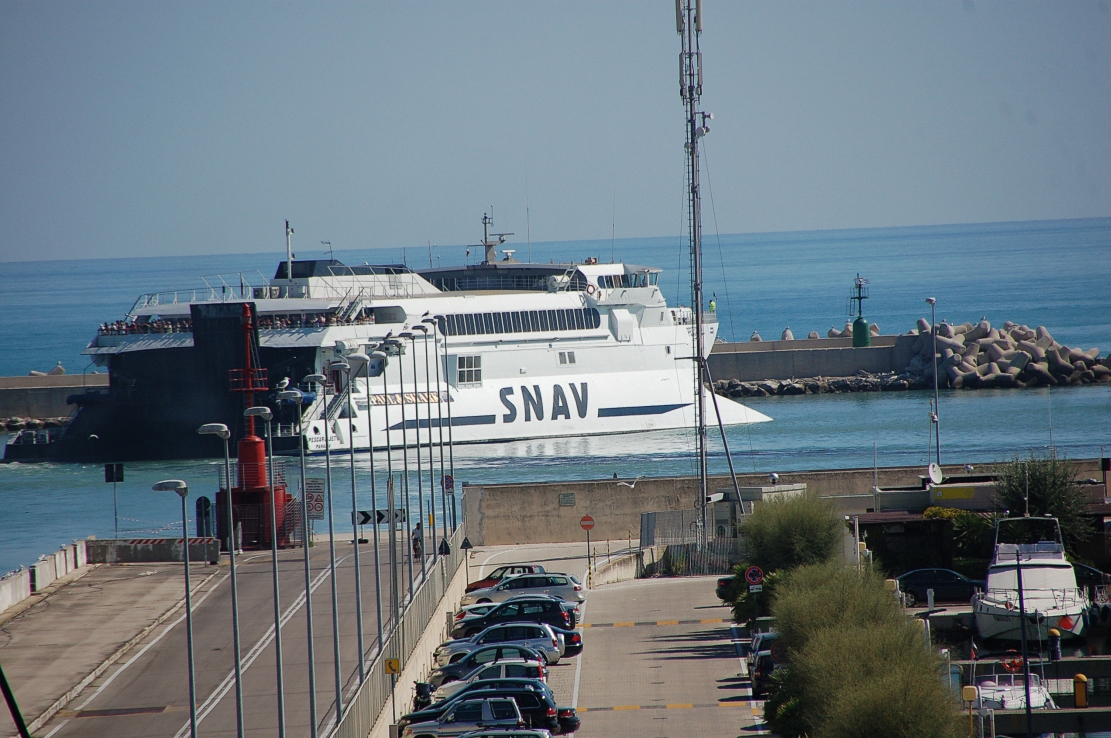
Hydrofoil SNAV at port

- Total area of Marina di Pescara: over 200,000 square meters
- Seabed: mud and sand
- Depth: shore fishing: 0.50 to 3 m
- Commercial harbor pier: 5 m
- East dock: 7 m
- Surface area of commercial docks: sqm. 15,000, east dock port: sqm. 47,000
- Moorings and docks features: two dedicated to fishing piers with 92 mooring points
- South quay length (including commercial dock): 885 meters
- North quay length: 590 meters
- Length of the east dock: 420 total yards (220 m wharf, quay 200 m east)
- Water surface: square meters 105,000
- Berths Ro: no two docks at the new quay
- Vehicle parking: area adjacent to the Maritime Station
- Access time: daylight hours for units of more than 150 tonnes, continuing for the other

=== Services and facilities ===
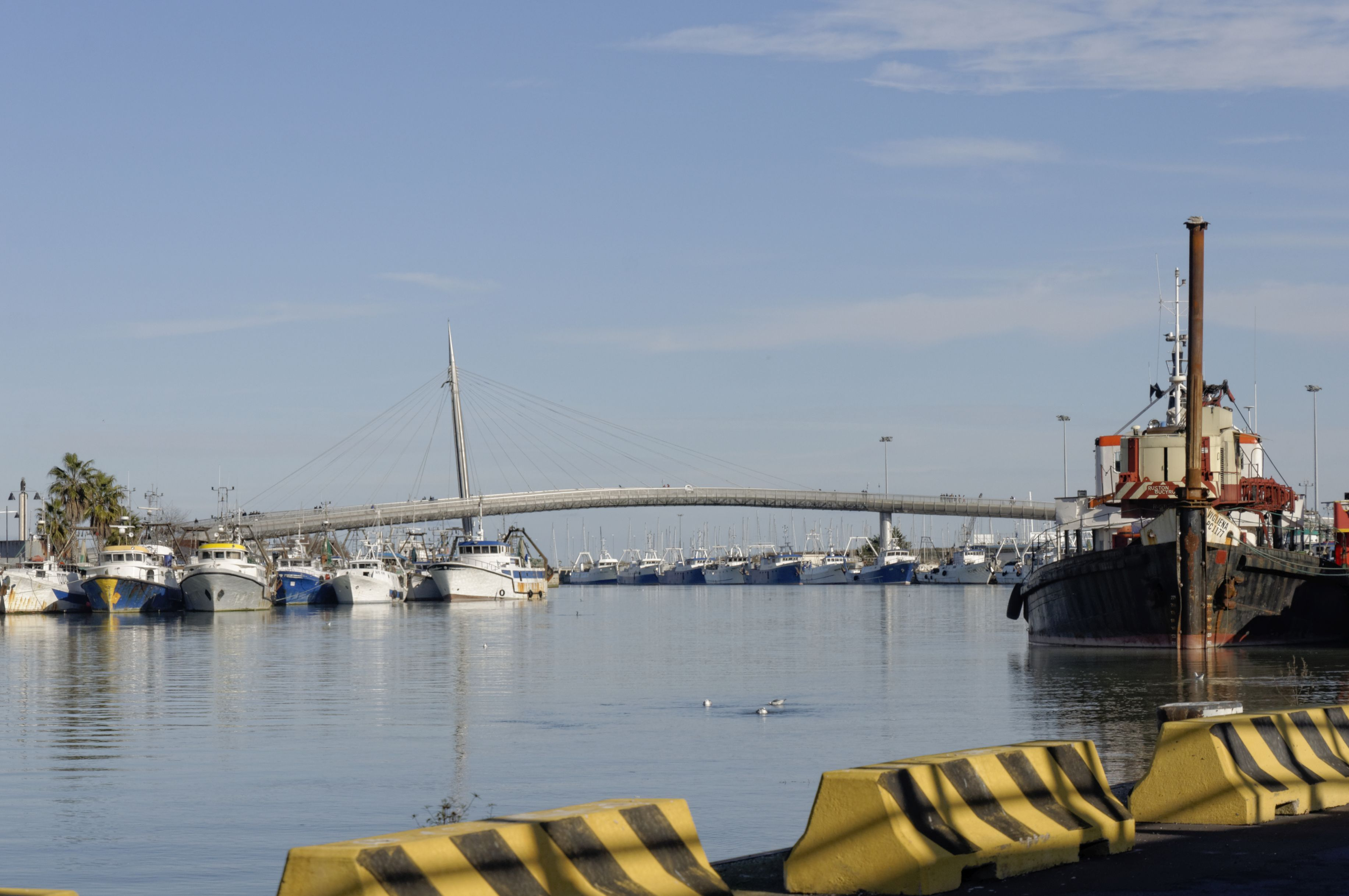
Fishing boats

Port of Pescara is equipped

- Police
- Financial Police
- Coast Guard
- No. 4 fuel oil distributors
- Mobile crane 37, 70 and 120 tonnes
- Slipway
- Repairs (wooden boats)
- Nautical workshops
- Pilotage
- Mooring
- Divers
- Weather support and radar
- 24 hours of radio listening 24 VHF channels 6, 16
- Fire fighting
- Pollution control
- Mooring of dead body
- Mooring and monitoring service 24 hours

Dock amenities:

- Drinking water
- Lighting
- Showers and toilets
- Garage
- Lubricants and S.I.F.
- Board services (bunkering, galley, laundry, a sailor on board, recovered at sea)
- Freight and passenger traffic data

=== Data on the goods and passengers ===
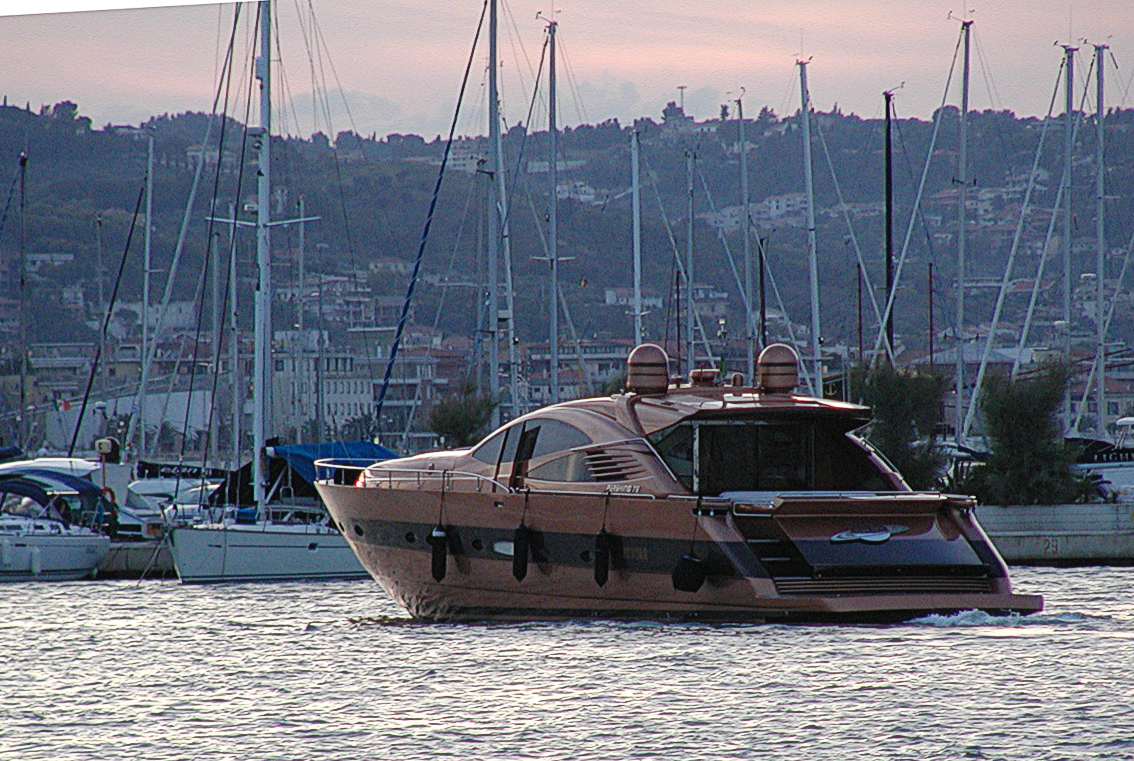
Yacht at port

The following is in reference to 2010.

Summary:

- Petrol ecological 2264.026 tons
- 20533.665 tons diesel
- Sansa exhausted 2630.00 tons
- 12485.37 ton coils
- 2800 ton tanks
- 1988.160 tons metal pipes
- Passengers disembarked 11525
- Passengers boarded 11935
- Car landed 1871
- Cars loaded 2086
- Camper Caravan landed 58
- Campers caravans loaded 78
- Motorcycles landed 147
- Moto shipped 198

== See also ==
- Pescara
