= European route E35 =

Road in trans-European E-road network

E35

Major junctions
- North end: E22 in Amsterdam, Netherlands
- E25 / E30 / E311 in Utrecht, Netherlands; E40 in Cologne, Germany; E50 in Walldorf, Germany; E25 in Basel, Switzerland; E60 in Olten, Switzerland; E75 in Piacenza, Italy; E45 at various locations in ITA
- South end: E80 / E821 in Rome, Italy

Location
- Countries: Netherlands, Germany, Switzerland, Italy

Highway system
- International E-road network; A Class; B Class

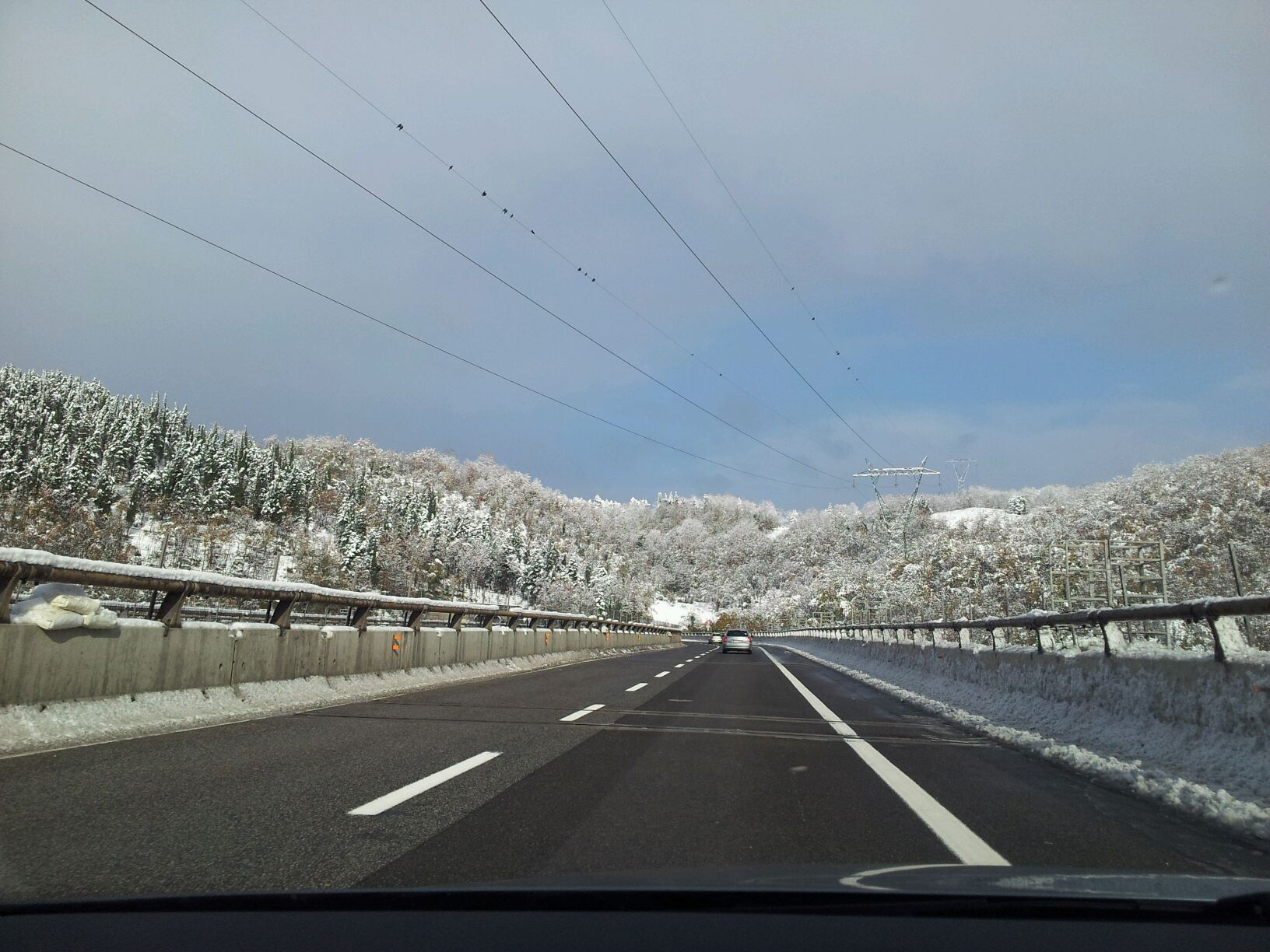
European route 35 near Barberino di Mugello, Italy.

European route E35 is a European route that runs between Amsterdam, Netherlands, in northwestern Europe, and Rome, Italy in the south of the continent. The road heads through Germany and Switzerland before reaching Italy.

== Route description ==
=== Netherlands ===
- A 10: Amsterdam ( E19 E22 E19 E231)
- A 2: Amsterdam ( E19) - Utrecht ( E25 E30)
- A 12: Utrecht ( E25 E30 E311) - Arnhem - Zevenaar

=== Germany ===
- A 3: Emmerich am Rhein - Duisburg E34 - Köln ( E31 E37 E40) - Limburg a. d. Lahn ( E44) - Frankfurt am Main ( E42)
- A 5: Frankfurt am Main ( E42) - Darmstadt ( E451) - Mannheim ( E50, Towards E30) - Karlsruhe (Start of Concurrency with E52) - Offenburg ( E531), End of Concurrency with E52) - Weil am Rhein ( E54)

=== Switzerland ===
- A 2: Basel ( E60, Start of Concurrency with E25) - Olten (End of Concurrency with E25) - Lucerne - Altdorf ( E41) - Bellinzona ( E43) - Lugano - Chiasso

=== Italy ===
- A 9: Como - Lainate ( E62)
- A 8: Lainate ( E62) - Milan ( E62)
- A 50: Milan ( E62 E64)
- A 1: Milan - Piacenza ( E70) - Parma ( E33) - Modena (Start of Concurrency with E45) - Bologna (End of Concurrency with E45) - Sasso Marconi
- A 1var: Sasso Marconi - Barberino di Mugello
- A 1: Barberino di Mugello - Florence ( E76) - Arezzo ( E78) - Orte (Start of Concurrency with E45) - Fiano Romano (End of Concurrency with E45)
- A 1dir: Fiano Romano ( E45) - Rome (Towards E80 / E821)

== Major intersections ==
Principal Cities, North to South:

Netherlands

- Amsterdam (A2)
- Utrecht (A2, A12)
- Ede (A12)
- Arnhem (A12)

Germany

- Duisburg (A3)
- Düsseldorf (A3)
- Cologne (A3)
- Bonn (A3)
- Wiesbaden (A3)
- Frankfurt am Main (A3)
- Darmstadt (A67, A5)
- Bensheim (A5)
- Heidelberg (A5)
- Karlsruhe (A5)
- Baden-Baden (A5)
- Freiburg im Breisgau (A5)

Switzerland

- Basel (A2)
- Lucerne (A2)
- Altdorf (A2)
- Bellinzona (A2)
- Lugano (A2)
- Chiasso (A2)

Italy

- Como (A9)
- Milan (A9, A8, A50, A1)
- Piacenza (A1)
- Parma (A1)
- Modena (A1)
- Bologna (A1)
- Florence (A1)
- Arezzo (A1)
- Orvieto (A1)
- Rome (A1dir)

=== Tunnels ===
- St. Gotthard Tunnel, Switzerland
