= European route E801 =

Road in trans-European E-road network

E801

Route information
- Length: 262 km (163 mi)

Major junctions
- From: Coimbra
- Viseu, Chaves
- To: Verín

Location
- Countries: Portugal, Spain

Highway system
- International E-road network; A Class; B Class

European route E 801 is a European B class road in Portugal and Spain, connecting the cities Coimbra, Portugal and Verín, Spain.

== Route ==
- Portugal
  - E80, E01 Coimbra
  - E80 Viseu
  - E805 Chaves
- Spain
  - Verín
