= European route E607 =

Road in trans-European E-road network

E607

Route information
- Length: 88 km (55 mi)

Major junctions
- From: Digoin
- To: Chalon-sur-Saône

Location
- Countries: France

Highway system
- International E-road network; A Class; B Class

European route E 607 is a European B class road in France, connecting the cities Digoin and Chalon-sur-Saône.

== Route ==
- France
  - Digoin
  - Chalon-sur-Saône
