= Célony =

Coordinates: 43°33′23″N 5°25′14″E

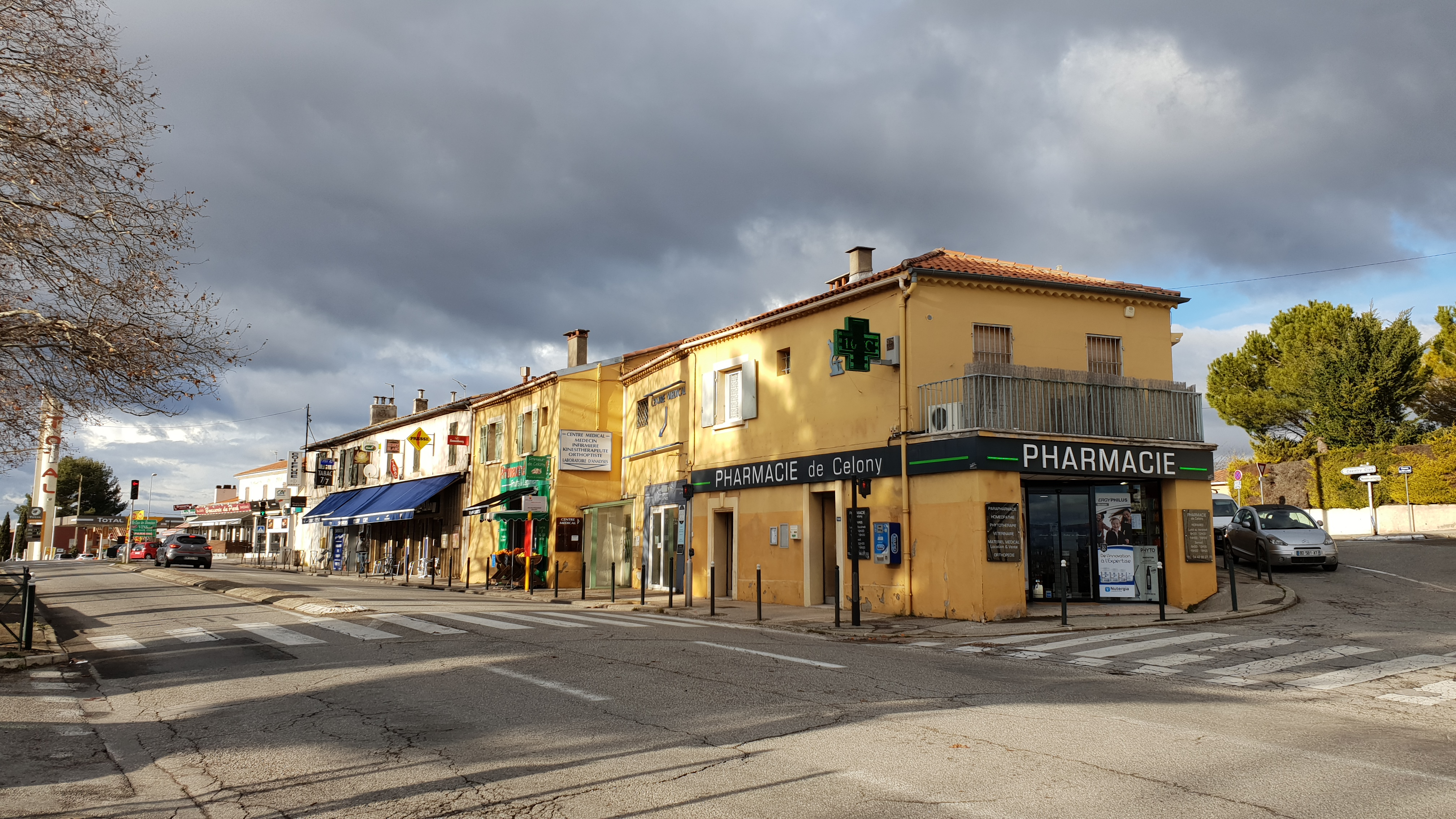

Célony (French pronunciation: [selɔni]) is a village close to Aix-en-Provence in France.

== Overview ==
It is home to former gypsum quarries, bastides and farms, and a high school.

The Rue Célony in Aix-en-Provence is named for the village.
