= Septèmes-les-Vallons =

Commune in Provence-Alpes-Côte d'Azur, France

- Commune
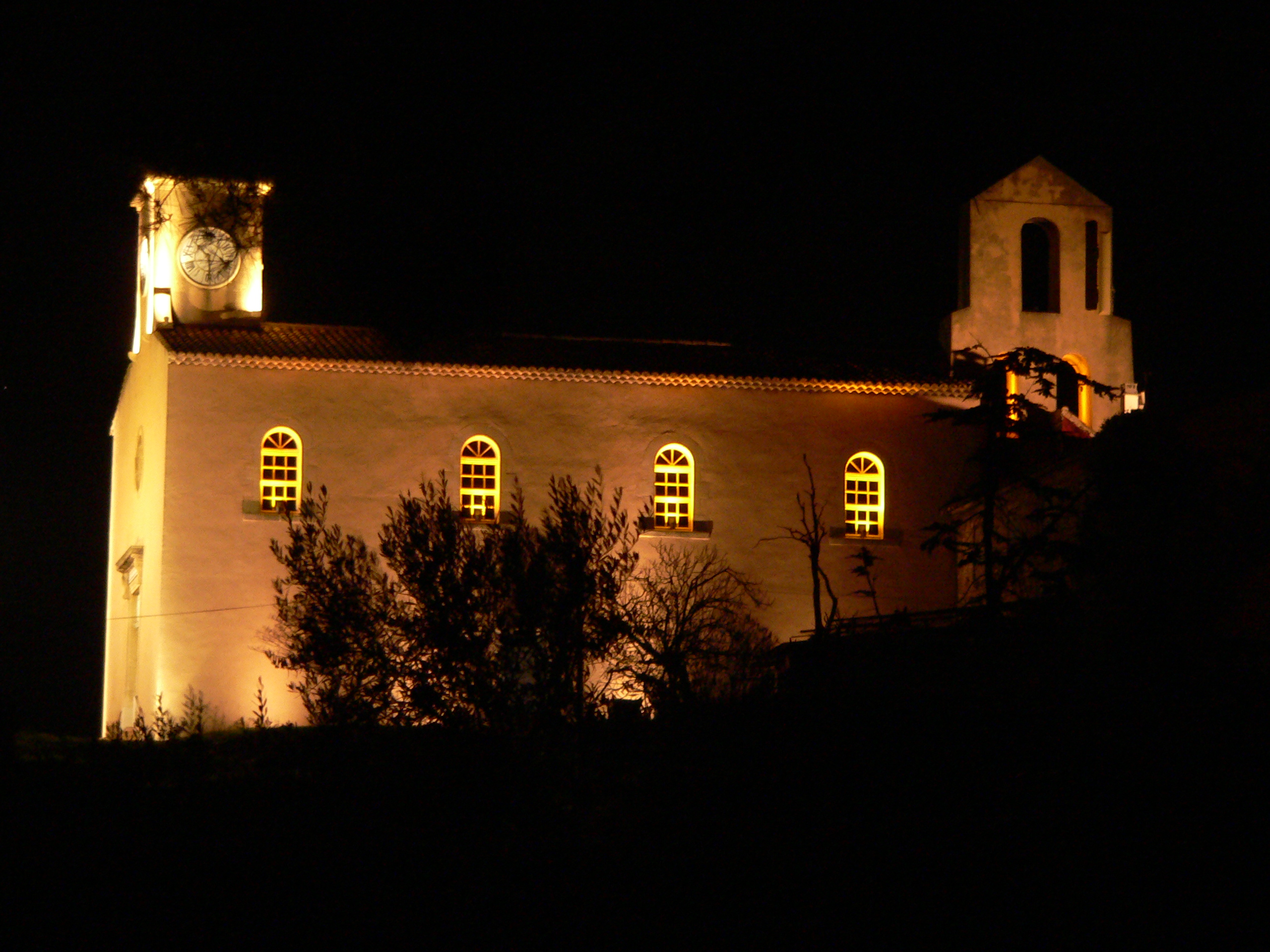
- A night view of the old church in Septèmes-les-Vallons

- Coat of arms
- Location of Septèmes-les-Vallons
- Location within France Location within Provence-Alpes-Côte d'Azur
- Coordinates: 43°23′57″N 5°22′00″E
- Country: France
- Region: Provence-Alpes-Côte d'Azur
- Department: Bouches-du-Rhône
- Arrondissement: Marseille
- Canton: Gardanne
- Intercommunality: Aix-Marseille-Provence

Government
  - Mayor (2026–32): André Molino
- Area^{1}: 17.84 km^{2} (6.89 sq mi)
- Elevation: 215 m (705 ft)
- Highest elevation: 580 m (1,900 ft)
- Lowest elevation: 140 m (460 ft)
- Population (2023): 11,995
  - Density: 672.4/km^{2} (1,741/sq mi)
- Time zone: UTC+01:00 (CET)
  - Summer (DST): UTC+02:00 (CEST)
- INSEE/Postal code: 13106 /13240
- ^{1} French Land Register data, which excludes lakes, ponds, glaciers > 1 km^{2} (0.386 sq mi or 247 acres) and river estuaries.

Septèmes-les-Vallons (French pronunciation: [sɛptɛm le valɔ̃]; Occitan: Septèmes lo Valladas) is a commune in the Bouches-du-Rhône department in southern France. It is located 10.7 km (6.5 mi) north from the centre of Marseille.

== Population ==
Historical population

Year	Pop.	±% p.a.
1793	598	—
1800	285	−10.05%
1806	406	+6.08%
1821	701	+3.71%
1831	852	+1.97%
1836	916	+1.46%
1841	992	+1.61%
1846	995	+0.06%
1851	1,259	+4.82%
1856	1,473	+3.19%
1861	1,503	+0.40%
1866	1,623	+1.55%
1872	1,616	−0.07%
1876	2,024	+5.79%
1881	1,600	−4.59%
1886	1,656	+0.69%
1891	1,615	−0.50%
1896	1,739	+1.49%
1901	1,742	+0.03%

Year	Pop.	±% p.a.
1906	1,641	−1.19%
1911	1,819	+2.08%
1921	1,827	+0.04%
1926	2,229	+4.06%
1931	2,751	+4.30%
1936	3,072	+2.23%
1946	3,144	+0.23%
1954	4,115	+3.42%
1962	4,600	+1.40%
1968	5,844	+4.07%
1975	10,827	+9.21%
1982	10,681	−0.19%
1990	10,415	−0.31%
1999	10,202	−0.23%
2007	10,396	+0.24%
2012	10,708	+0.59%
2017	11,019	+0.57%
2023	11,995	+1.42%

Source: EHESS and INSEE (1968-2023)

== See also ==
- Communes of the Bouches-du-Rhône department
- Spartan Space
