= European route E712 =

Road in trans-European E-road network

E712

Route information
- Length: 453 km (281 mi)

Major junctions
- From: Geneva
- Chambéry, Grenoble, Aix-en-Provence
- To: Marseille

Location
- Countries: Switzerland, France

Highway system
- International E-road network; A Class; B Class

European route E 712 is a European B class road in Switzerland and France, connecting the cities Geneva — Marseille.

== Route ==
- Switzerland
  - E25, E21, E62 Geneva
- France
  - E70 Chambéry
  - Grenoble
  - Aix-en-Provence
  - E714 Chambéry
