= European route E714 =

Road in trans-European E-road network

E714

Route information
- Length: 117 km (73 mi)

Major junctions
- From: Orange
- To: Marseille

Location
- Countries: France

Highway system
- International E-road network; A Class; B Class

European route E 714 is a European B class road in France, connecting the cities Orange — Marseille.

== Route ==
- France
  - E15 Orange
  - E712 Marseille
