= A89 autoroute =

Road in France

A89 autoroute
- La Transeuropéenne; Autoroute des présidents

Route information
- Part of E70
- Maintained by ASF and APRR
- Length: 545 km (339 mi)
- Existed: 1991–present

Major junctions
- West end: E70 / N 89 at Arveyres near Libourne

- E9 / A 20 in Ussac and Saint-Pardoux-l'Ortigier; E11 / A 71 in Combronde and Clermont-Ferrand; A 710 in Clermont-Ferrand; A 711 in Martres-d'Artière; A 72 in Nervieux

- East end: E70 / A 6 / M 6 in Limonest

Location
- Country: France
- Major cities: Libourne, Périgueux, Brive-la-Gaillarde, Tulle, Clermont-Ferrand, Thiers, Tarare, Lyon

Highway system
- Roads in France; Autoroutes; Routes nationales

The A89 autoroute is an autoroute in central France. It is known as the La Transeuropéenne. It connects Bordeaux (from Libourne) and Lyon (at Limonest) via Clermont-Ferrand. Its total length is 544 km (338 mi).

The project started in 1991 and was completed in 2018. It is composed of a new road construction and the re-use of a large part of the A72 built in the 1980s. The autoroute has taken the number of the national road it runs along, the N89.

Of the 544 kilometers in service: 167 km is between Libourne and Brive, 175 km between Saint-Germain-les-Vergnes and Combronde and 143 km between Clermont-Ferrand and Limonest. It is a concession of the Autoroutes du Sud de la France with the exception of the last section, 5 km between La Tour-de-Salvagny and Limonest was conceded to Autoroutes Paris-Rhin-Rhône.

In order to ensure the continuity of the numbers, following the opening of the section between the Saint-Julien-Sancy interchange and the Combronde junction in early 2006, the common core of the A71 motorway now bears both names (A71-A89), while the A710 and A72 autoroutes between Clermont-Ferrand and Balbigny, have been renamed the A89.

== History ==
This transversal autoroute was intended as a powerful tool to open up the center of France, previously connected only to Paris, and a faster link between the second and sixth largest urban areas of France, that of Lyon and Bordeaux. Its commercial name is therefore La Transeuropéenne. It is also nicknamed the Autoroute des Présidents because it crosses the fiefdoms of several French Presidents, Valéry Giscard d'Estaing, Jacques Chirac and Francois Hollande, and it passes close to that of Georges Pompidou. Because of the environmental sensitivity of the Parc naturel régional des volcans d'Auvergne especially the visual impact of such work, it was chosen not to cross the Chaîne des Puys in the middle. As it approached the area, the autoroute heads north-east to get around the volcanoes, depriving Clermont-Ferrand of direct access to the autoroute from the west.

=== Open sections ===
The A89 motorway is divided into several sections:

- Libourne - Périgueux - Thenon - Terrasson-Lavilledieu - Brive;
- Saint-Germain-les-Vergnes - Tulle - Ussel - Saint-Julien-Puy-Lavèze - Combronde;
- Combronde - Clermont-Ferrand: common link (double numbered) by the A71;
- Clermont-Ferrand - Thiers - Balbigny (formerly A72, renamed A89 in 2006);
- Balbigny - The Tour-de-Salvagny.

The section of Arveyres at Saint-Julien-Puy-Lavèze, 288 km long, was declared a public utility on 10 January 1996. The section between Peyrignac and Cublac was also on 12 July 2005.

=== Section from Balbigny to La Tour-de-Salvagny ===
Work began on 28 June 2008 with the digging of the first 3.9 km tunnel between Violay (Loire) and Joux (Rhône). From a distance of 49.5 km, including 31.5 km in the Loire, this motorway section also connected Roanne to La Tour-de-Salvagny at the entry to Lyon, via Balbigny. The project cost €1.5 billion.

In September 2010, the Viaduc du Torranchin at Pontcharra-sur-Turdine was the first structure completed on this section. This 196-meter-long, 21.55-meter-wide structure, costing €11 million, was built by Eiffage Travaux Publics, Eiffel Construction Métallique and the Forézienne d'Entreprises.

In total, ten exceptional structures were built: seven viaducts, the most spectacular of which is the Viaduc de Goutte Vignole (618 meters), and three tunnels: Tunnel de Violay (3 900 m), tunnel of La Bussière ( 1,050 m) and the Chalosset tunnel (750 m). The A89 has 2 × 3 lanes of 5 km on each side of the Tunnel de Violay.

This section, however, was included in the national master plan for infrastructure in the 1970s, before being abandoned in 1975 following the oil crisis. The section, crossing the sectors of the lower valley of the Azergues and Beaujolais, were contested by the agricultural areas and by a strong urban area (near Villefranche-sur-Saône). Despite the refusal by the associations, including a coordinating committee against the highway in Beaujolais (3CAB), which preferred the development of a national road with 2 × 2 lanes, the preliminary design studies summary still took place in 1997. The public inquiry was launched in June 1997 and the commission of inquiry gave a favorable opinion for the realisation of this section of highway. The procedure, leading to a declaration for public use, was not pursued according to a press release of 5 January 1999, following environmental difficulties as contained in the CIADT of 15 December 1998. The project then cost 11 billion francs. Twenty residents associations were formed against this highway between 1987 and 1995. This section, up to La Tour-de-Salvagny, was declared a public utility on 17 April 2003. The section was inaugurated on 19 January 2013 and opened two days later.

=== Section between the A20 and Saint-Germain-les-Vergnes ===
A press release from the Corrèze Prefecture, dated 15 May 2006, confirmed the extension of the A89, north of Brive-la-Gaillarde, by 2 × 2 lanes of the D9 by 2012–2013 to A20 with a possible 2 × 3 lanes depending on the future road traffic. This meant the definitive abandonment of the stretch between Saint-Germain-les-Vergnes and Brive-Nord, which cosigned with the A20.

The 4.5 km section was inaugurated on 7 February 2015 by François Hollande, President of the Republic, and put into service on 17 April 2015.

=== Section between La Tour-de-Salvagny and Limonest ===
On 4 April 2016, the work to construct the A89 link at La Tour-de-Salvagny with the A6 at Limonest began. This section opened on 3 March 2018, ensuring continuity with not only the A6 but also the A46 via the A466 motorway.

Municipal councilors, associations, the Urban Community of Lyon chaired by Gérard Collomb, the Rhône Department and other organizations opposed this connection by proposing an alternative to Anse/Quincieux (A46N), which would have reduced the traffic from the A89 on the already saturated Tunnel de Fourvière.

=== Completed sections ===
- Antenne de Balbigny
- Combronde-Saint-Julien-Puy-Lavèze-Ussel-Tulle-Saint-Germain-les-Vergnes
- Brive-Terrasson-Lavilledieu
- Thenon-Périgueux-Libourne
- Balbigny-Thiers-Clermont-Ferrand: Parc de l'image.
- Combronde-Clermont-Ferrand the road merges with the A71 autoroute.

=== Planned sections ===
- Remodeling the interchange with the A630 Bordeaux ring road (Rocade).
- Upgrade of the highway status of the N89 between Bordeaux and Libourne.
- Offshoot of Saint-Beauzire (A71 - A89 link for the northern bypass of Clermont-Ferrand) - 7 km

== List of junctions and exits ==
=== RN 89 ===
Region	Department	Junction	Destinations	Notes
Nouvelle-Aquitaine	Gironde	RN 230 - RN 89	Rocade intérieure: Toulouse (A62), Bayonne, Bassin d'Arcachon (A63), Bordeaux - centre	
Nouvelle-Aquitaine	Gironde	RN 230 - RN 89	Rocade extérieure: Paris (A10), Mérignac, Carbon-Blanc, Lormont, Zone Portuaire	
Nouvelle-Aquitaine	Gironde	1: Artigues	Artigues-près-Bordeaux	
Nouvelle-Aquitaine	Gironde	Aire du Relais du Moulinat (Eastbound)		
Nouvelle-Aquitaine	Gironde	2: Poteau d'Yvrac	Yvrac, Tresses	
Nouvelle-Aquitaine	Gironde	3: Montussan - ouest	Montussan	
Nouvelle-Aquitaine	Gironde	4: Montussan - est	Saint-Loubès, Pompignac, Montussan	
Nouvelle-Aquitaine	Gironde	5: L'Intendant	Saint-Sulpice-et-Cameyrac, Beychac-et-Caillau	
Nouvelle-Aquitaine	Gironde	6: Beychac-et-Caillau	Beychac-et-Caillau	
Nouvelle-Aquitaine	Gironde	Aire du Relais de Canteloup (Westbound)		
Nouvelle-Aquitaine	Gironde	7: Grand-Cazau	Vayres, Izon	
Nouvelle-Aquitaine	Gironde	8: Senau	Arveyres, Saint-Germain-du-Puch, Libourne - centre	
Nouvelle-Aquitaine	Gironde	9: Libourne - est	Périgueux, Bergerac, Castillon-la-Bataille, Saint-Émilion, Libourne	Entry and exit from Bordeaux
E70 / N 89 becomes E70 / A 89
1.000 mi = 1.609 km; 1.000 km = 0.621 mi

=== A89 ===
Region	Department	Junction	Destinations	Notes
E70 / N 89 becomes E70 / A 89
Nouvelle-Aquitaine	Gironde	Péage d'Arveyres		
Nouvelle-Aquitaine	Gironde	10: Libourne - nord	Royan, Saintes (A10), Saint-André-de-Cubzac, Saint-Denis-de-Pile, Libourne	
Nouvelle-Aquitaine	Gironde	Aire des Vignes		
Nouvelle-Aquitaine	Gironde	11: Coutras	Coutras, Saint-Émilion	
Nouvelle-Aquitaine	Gironde	Aire des Palombières		
Nouvelle-Aquitaine	Dordogne	12: Montpon-Ménestérol	Ribérac, Castillon-la-Bataille, Sainte-Foy-la-Grande, Montpon-Ménestérol	
Nouvelle-Aquitaine	Dordogne	13: Mussidan - sud	Mussidan, Bergerac, Ribérac	
Nouvelle-Aquitaine	Dordogne	13.1: Mussidan - est	Neuvic, Mussidan, Villamblard	Entry and exit from Bordeaux
Nouvelle-Aquitaine	Dordogne	Péage de Musidan		
Nouvelle-Aquitaine	Dordogne	14: Périgueux - ouest	Bordeaux, Libourne, Angoulême, Coulounieix-Chamiers, Saint-Astier, Périgueux - ouest	
Nouvelle-Aquitaine	Dordogne	15: Périgueux - sud	Agen, Bergerac, Périgueux - centre, Coulounieix-Chamiers	
Nouvelle-Aquitaine	Dordogne	16: Périgueux - est	Limoges, Brive-la-Gaillarde, Périgueux, Angoulême, Les Eyzies-de-Tayac-Sireuil, Trélissac, Boulazac, Sarlat-la-Canéda	
Nouvelle-Aquitaine	Dordogne	16: Périgueux - est	Aire du Manoire	
Nouvelle-Aquitaine	Dordogne	Péage de Thenon		
Nouvelle-Aquitaine	Dordogne	17: Thenon - La Bachellerie	Thenon, Le Lardin-Saint-Lazare, La Bachellerie, Saint-Yrieix-la-Perche, Montignac-Lascaux, Terrasson-Lavilledieu	
Nouvelle-Aquitaine	Corrèze	18: Mansac - Terrasson	Terrasson-Lavilledieu, Larche, Sarlat, Montignac-Lascaux	
Nouvelle-Aquitaine	Corrèze	Aire du Pays de Brive		
Nouvelle-Aquitaine	Corrèze	19: Brive - ouest	Brive-la-Gaillarde - centre, Objat, Allassac	Entry and exit from Bordeaux
Nouvelle-Aquitaine	Corrèze	A20 South - A89	Cahors, Toulouse, Montauban	
Nouvelle-Aquitaine	Corrèze	E70 / A 89 becomes E70 / A 89 / E9 / A 20		
Nouvelle-Aquitaine	Corrèze	A20 North - A89	Paris, Limoges	
Nouvelle-Aquitaine	Corrèze	E70 / A 89 / E9 / A 20 becomes again E70 / A 89		
Nouvelle-Aquitaine	Corrèze	19.1: Saint-Germain-les-Vergnes	Saint-Germain-les-Vergnes, Malemort	
Nouvelle-Aquitaine	Corrèze	Péage de Saint-Germain-les-Vergnes		
Nouvelle-Aquitaine	Corrèze	20: Tulle - nord	Tulle - centre, Uzerche	
Nouvelle-Aquitaine	Corrèze	21: Tulle - est	Tulle - centre, Aurillac, Beaulieu-sur-Dordogne, Argentat-sur-Dordogne	
Nouvelle-Aquitaine	Corrèze	Aire de la Corrèze		
Nouvelle-Aquitaine	Corrèze	22: Égletons	Aubusson, Mauriac, Égletons	
Nouvelle-Aquitaine	Corrèze	23: Ussel - ouest	Bort-les-Orgues, Meymac, Ussel - centre, Mauriac	
Nouvelle-Aquitaine	Corrèze	Aire de la Loutre		
Nouvelle-Aquitaine	Corrèze	24: Ussel - est	Ussel - centre, Aubusson, Eygurande	
Nouvelle-Aquitaine	Corrèze	Aire du Chavanon		
Auvergne-Rhône-Alpes	Puy-de-Dôme	25: Saint-Julien - Sancy	Clermont-Ferrand - sud, Mont-Dore, La Bourboule	
Auvergne-Rhône-Alpes	Puy-de-Dôme	Aire de Prondines (Eastbound); Aire d'Heume-l'Église (Westbound)		
Auvergne-Rhône-Alpes	Puy-de-Dôme	26: Vulcania - Bromont	Puy de Dôme, Vulcania, Guéret, Pontgibaud, Volvic	
Auvergne-Rhône-Alpes	Puy-de-Dôme	27: Manzat	Riom, Châtel-Guyon, Manzat	
Auvergne-Rhône-Alpes	Puy-de-Dôme	27: Manzat	Aire de Manzat	
Auvergne-Rhône-Alpes	Puy-de-Dôme	A71 North - A89	Paris, Montluçon, Vichy	
Auvergne-Rhône-Alpes	Puy-de-Dôme	E70 / A 89 becomes E70 / A 89 / E11 / A 71		
Auvergne-Rhône-Alpes	Puy-de-Dôme	A71 South & A710 - A89	Montpellier (A75), Clermont-Ferrand - est	
Auvergne-Rhône-Alpes	Puy-de-Dôme	A71 South & A710 - A89	Clermont-Ferrand - nord, Aulnat	
Auvergne-Rhône-Alpes	Puy-de-Dôme	E70 / A 89 / E11 / A 71 becomes again E70 / A 89		
Auvergne-Rhône-Alpes	Puy-de-Dôme	A711 - A89	Clermont-Ferrand - sud, Aéroport de Clermont-Ferrand-Auvergne, Montpellier (A75)	
Auvergne-Rhône-Alpes	Puy-de-Dôme	Péage des Martres d'Artière		
Auvergne-Rhône-Alpes	Puy-de-Dôme	Aire du Branchilion (Eastbound); Aire des Pacages (Westbound)		
Auvergne-Rhône-Alpes	Puy-de-Dôme	28: Lezoux	Lezoux, Billom, Maringues	
Auvergne-Rhône-Alpes	Puy-de-Dôme	Aire de Limagne		
Auvergne-Rhône-Alpes	Puy-de-Dôme	29: Thiers - ouest	Vichy, Ambert, Courpière, Thiers - centre	
Auvergne-Rhône-Alpes	Puy-de-Dôme	Aire des Pins (Eastbound); Aire du Lac (Westbound)		
Auvergne-Rhône-Alpes	Puy-de-Dôme	30: Thiers - est	Thiers - centre, Chabreloche, Saint-Rémy-sur-Durolle, La Monnerie-le-Montel	
Auvergne-Rhône-Alpes	Puy-de-Dôme	Aire des Suchères (Westbound)		
Auvergne-Rhône-Alpes	Loire	31: Noirétable	Roanne, Saint-Just-en-Chevalet, Noirétable	
Auvergne-Rhône-Alpes	Loire	Aire du Haut-Forez		
Auvergne-Rhône-Alpes	Loire	32: Saint-Germain-Laval	Boën-sur-Lignon, Saint-Germain-Laval	
Auvergne-Rhône-Alpes	Loire	Aire des Bruyères (Eastbound); Aire des Ardilliers (Westbound)		
Auvergne-Rhône-Alpes	Loire	33: Balbigny	Roanne, Balbigny, Flers	
Auvergne-Rhône-Alpes	Loire	Aire de la Loire		
Auvergne-Rhône-Alpes	Rhône	34: Tarare - ouest	Thizy-les-Bourgs, Amplepuis, Tarare - centre, Panissières	
Auvergne-Rhône-Alpes	Rhône	35: Tarare - est	Villefranche-sur-Saône, Tarare, Pontcharra-sur-Turdine, Vallée d'Azergues	
Auvergne-Rhône-Alpes	Rhône	Péage de Saint-Romain-de-Popey		
Auvergne-Rhône-Alpes	Rhône	Aire des Pierres Dorées		
Auvergne-Rhône-Alpes	Rhône	36: L'Arbresle	Roanne, Thiers, L'Arbresle	
Auvergne-Rhône-Alpes	Rhône	37: Ponts-de-Dorieux	Chazay-d'Azergues, Vallée d'Azergues	
Auvergne-Rhône-Alpes	Rhône	38: Lentilly	Lentilly, Dommartin, Marcy-l'Étoile, Charpenay	
Auvergne-Rhône-Alpes	Rhône	39: La Tour-de-Salvagny - ouest	Lozanne, Dommartin, Charpenay, La Tour-de-Salvagny	
Auvergne-Rhône-Alpes	Rhône	40: La Tour-de-Salvagny - est	Tassin-la-Demi-Lune, Charbonnières-les-Bains, Dardilly, La Tour-de-Salvagny, Marcy-L'Étoile	
Auvergne-Rhône-Alpes	Rhône	41: Dardilly	Anse, Lissieu, Villefranche-sur-Saône	
Auvergne-Rhône-Alpes	Rhône	A6 & M6 - A89	Paris, Villefranche-sur-Saône, Genève, Grenoble, Saint-Exupéry	
Auvergne-Rhône-Alpes	Rhône	A6 & M6 - A89	Lyon	
1.000 mi = 1.609 km; 1.000 km = 0.621 mi
