= A20 autoroute =

French road

A20 autoroute
- L'Occitane
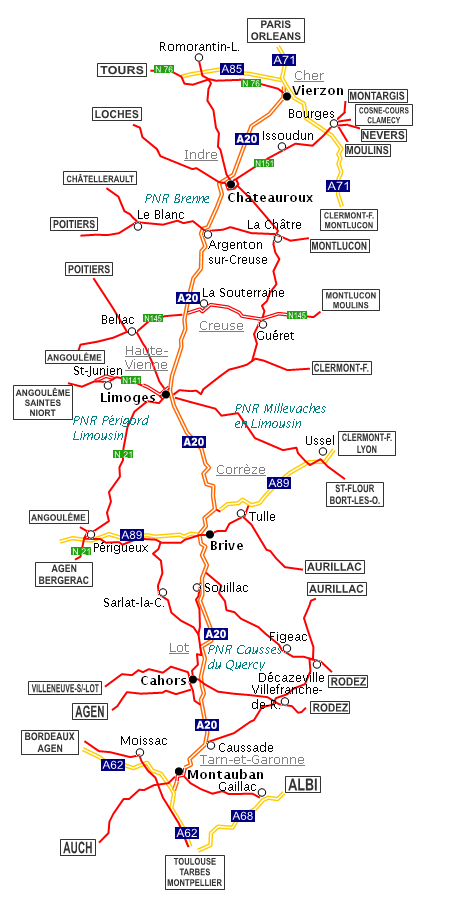

Route information
- Part of E9 / E70
- Maintained by Cofiroute, DIR Centre-Ouest and ASF
- Length: 427 km (265 mi)
- Existed: 1992–present

Major junctions
- North end: E9 / E11 / A 71 in Vierzon

- E62 / N 145 in Saint-Amand-Magnazeix; N 520 in Limoges; E70 / A 89 in Saint-Pardoux-l'Ortigier and Ussac

- South end: E9 / E72 / A 62 in Montbartier

Location
- Country: France

Highway system
- Roads in France; Autoroutes; Routes nationales

The A20 autoroute or L'Occitane is a highway through central France. A part of France's national network of autoroutes, it is 427 kilometres (265 mi) long.

== Regions Crossed ==
The road travels through the areas of Centre-Val de Loire, Occitania and Nouvelle-Aquitaine. It starts at Vierzon in Cher and finishes in the south at Montauban in Tarn-et-Garonne. However further sections between Orléans and Vierzon (A71) and Montauban-Toulouse (A62) could be renamed the A20 in the not too distant future. L'Occitane is free from Vierzon to Brive-la-Gaillarde via Limoges.

The operating companies are ASF between Cressensac and Montauban, DIR Centre-Ouest in the department between Vierzon and Nespouls. The road crosses the following departments Cher, Indre, Creuse, Haute-Vienne, Corrèze, Lot, Tarn-et-Garonne

== History ==
The motorway was proposed to reduce the travel time along the RN20 and to avoid congestion during holiday periods at Châteauroux, Argenton-sur-Creuse, Saint-Benoît-du-Sault, Limoges, Uzerche, Brive, Souillac, Cahors and Montauban.

=== From Vierzon to Martel ===
The motorway is managed by the respective DIR Centre-Ouest in Cher, Indre, Creuse, Haute-Vienne, of Corrèze and Lot. It is a free motorway with 2x2 lanes, with certain sections with 2x3 lanes, for example the by-pass of Limoges.

==== History ====
- Pre 1992: The Brive and Limoges by-pass.
- 1992 to 2000: creation of the various sections of the motorway

==== Future ====
In the long term, a new by-pass for Limoges is proposed (The A20bis project), in order to return the section of the A20 motorway which crosses the Limoges conurbation to its original planned use as a major urban road.

=== From Martel to Montauban ===
The motorway is operated by ASF. It is a toll road (closed system) with 2x2 lanes.

==== History ====
- 1996 to 2003: Construction of the section.

=== Deviation of Montauban and Montauban section - A62 ===
This section is managed also by ASF. It is in 2x2 lanes and free. The Montauban by-pass is the last missing link of A20. The link is currently signaled the RN20 which has yet to be upgraded to autoroute standard. To the south of Montauban, the RN20 was upgraded to motorway standard in the Nineties, and has been re-numbered the A62.

==== History ====
- 1992: Construction of the Montauban by-pass
- 2007: Upgrade to the motorway standard

== Lists of exits and junctions ==
Region	Department	Junctions	Destinations	Notes
Centre-Val de Loire	Cher	A71 - A20	Vierzon - est, Bourges Clermont-Ferrand (A75)	
Centre-Val de Loire	Cher	A71 - A20	Tours (A85), Blois, Orléans, Paris (A10)	
Centre-Val de Loire	Cher	Péage de Vierzon - nord		
Centre-Val de Loire	Cher	5 : Vierzon - nord	Orléans, Auxerre, Vierzon	
Centre-Val de Loire	Cher	6 : Vierzon - ouest	Blois, Tours, Vierzon - Village, Méry-sur-Cher	
Centre-Val de Loire	Cher	7 : Vierzon - centre	Vierzon - Bourgneuf, Bourges, Saint-Florent-sur-Cher, Saint-Hilaire-de-Court, Méreau	
Centre-Val de Loire	Cher	8 : Massay - nord	Massay, Reuilly	Entry and exit from Vierzon
Centre-Val de Loire	Cher	8.1 : Massay - sud	Massay, Reuilly	
Centre-Val de Loire	Cher	9 : Graçay	Graçay, Saint-Outrille, Romorantin-Lanthenay	
Centre-Val de Loire	Indre	Aire des Champs d'Amours		
Centre-Val de Loire	Indre	10 : Vatan	Vatan, Issoudun, Valençay	Double exit and entry
Centre-Val de Loire	Indre	11 : Brion	Brion, La Champenoise, Levroux	Entry and exit only from Paris
Centre-Val de Loire	Indre	Aire des Avionneurs (Southbound); Aire des Blés d'Or (Northbound)		
Centre-Val de Loire	Indre	12 : Châteauroux - nord	Bourges, Blois, Montluçon, Châteauroux - centre, Déols, Issoudun, La Châtre, Zones Industrielles, Aéroport	
Centre-Val de Loire	Indre	13 : Châteauroux - ouest	Tours, Châteauroux - Saint-Christophe, Saint-Maur - centre, Villedieu-sur-Indre, Buzançais	
Centre-Val de Loire	Indre	13.1 : Les Echarbeaux	Châtellerault, Mézières-en-Brenne, Saint-Maur - Bel Air	Entry and exit from Vierzon
Centre-Val de Loire	Indre	14 : Châteauroux - sud	Châteauroux - centre, Châtellerault, Châteauroux, Saint-Maur - Cap Sud, Le Poinçonnet, Luant	
Centre-Val de Loire	Indre	Aire des Mille Étangs (Southbound); Aire du Val d'Indre (Northbound)		
Centre-Val de Loire	Indre	15 : Lothiey	Poitiers, Velles, Saint-Gaultier, Luant, Le Blanc	
Centre-Val de Loire	Indre	16 : Tendu	Tendu	
Centre-Val de Loire	Indre	17 : Argenton - nord	Argenton-sur-Creuse - centre, Saint-Marcel, Le Pêchereau, Le Blanc, La Châtre, Le Pont-Chrétien-Chabenet	
Centre-Val de Loire	Indre	18 : Argenton - sud	Argenton-sur-Creuse - Z. I., Prissac	
Centre-Val de Loire	Indre	Aire de la Marche Occitane (Southbound); Aire du Val de Creuse (Northbound)		
Centre-Val de Loire	Indre	19 : Celon	Celon, Vigoux, Ceaulmont	
Centre-Val de Loire	Indre	20 : Les Cinq Routes	Éguzon-Chantôme, Montmorillon, Parnac, Saint-Benoît-du-Sault	
Centre-Val de Loire	Indre	21 : Rhodes	Azerables, Mouhet, Saint-Benoît-du-Sault	
Nouvelle-Aquitaine	Haute-Vienne	Aire de Boismandé		
Nouvelle-Aquitaine	Haute-Vienne	22: Ruffasson	Arnac-la-Poste, Saint-Sulpice-les-Feuilles	
Nouvelle-Aquitaine	Haute-Vienne	23/23a/23b : La Croisière	Guéret, Montluçon, Saint-Maurice-la-Souterraine, La Souterraine, Saint-Sornin-Leulac, Magnac-Laval, Bellac	
Nouvelle-Aquitaine	Haute-Vienne	Aire de la Coulerouze		
Nouvelle-Aquitaine	Haute-Vienne	23.1 : La Croix du Breuil	Z. I. Croix du Breuil, Bessines-sur-Gartempe - Gare, Châteauponsac, Saint-Pierre-de-Fursac	Entry and exit from Vierzon
Nouvelle-Aquitaine	Haute-Vienne	24 : Bessines-sur-Gartempe	Bessines-sur-Gartempe, Bersac-sur-Rivalier, Laurière, Châteauponsac, Saint-Pierre-de-Fursac	
Nouvelle-Aquitaine	Haute-Vienne	25 : Razès	Razès, Lac de Saint-Pardoux, Saint-Sylvestre, Bersac-sur-Rivalier, Laurière	
Nouvelle-Aquitaine	Haute-Vienne	26 : La Crouzille	Compreignac, Nantiat, Saint-Sylvestre, Ambazac	
Nouvelle-Aquitaine	Haute-Vienne	27 : Trazmont	Beaune-les-Mines, Chaptelat, Ambazac, Saint-Priest-Taurion, Bonnac-la-Côte	
Nouvelle-Aquitaine	Haute-Vienne	Aire de Limoges		
Nouvelle-Aquitaine	Haute-Vienne	28 : Grossereix	Angoulême, Poitiers, Rilhac-Rancon, Couzeix, Saint-Junien, Limoges-Bellegarde, Z. I. Limoges - Nord	
Nouvelle-Aquitaine	Haute-Vienne	29 : Beaubreuil	Beaubreuil	
Nouvelle-Aquitaine	Haute-Vienne	30 : Limoges - nord	Le Palais-sur-Vienne, Limoges, Ester Technopole, Z. I. Nord. - Lac Uzurat	Entry and exit from Vierzon
Nouvelle-Aquitaine	Haute-Vienne	31 : Ester	Ester Technopole, Z. I. - Nord Lac Uzurat	Entry and exit from Montauban
Nouvelle-Aquitaine	Haute-Vienne	32 : Limoges - La Bastide	Limoges - nord	Entry and exit from Montauban
Nouvelle-Aquitaine	Haute-Vienne	33 : Limoges - centre	Limoges, Le Palais-sur-Vienne, Saint-Priest-Taurion, Aixe-sur-Vienne, Rochechouart, C.H.R.U de Limoges	
Nouvelle-Aquitaine	Haute-Vienne	34 : Panazol	Clermont-Ferrand, Panazol, Saint-Léonard-de-Noblat, Limoges - Le Sablard, Lac de Vassivière	Entry and exit from Vierzon
Nouvelle-Aquitaine	Haute-Vienne	35 : Le Bas-Fargeas	Clermont-Ferrand, Limoges - sud, Feytiat, Eymoutiers, Panazol, Saint-Léonard-de-Noblat, Limoges - Saint Lazare, Z. I. Ponteix	
Nouvelle-Aquitaine	Haute-Vienne	36 : Le Ponteix	Limoges - sud, Nexon, Saint-Yrieix-la-Perche, Z. I. Ponteix & Magret-Romanet	
Nouvelle-Aquitaine	Haute-Vienne	37 : Boisseuil	Les Quatre Vents, Boisseuil, Le Vigen, Zones commerciales Boisseuil - Le Vigen	
Nouvelle-Aquitaine	Haute-Vienne	38 : Le Vigen	Le Vigen, Solignac, Boisseuil, Pôle de Lanaud	
Nouvelle-Aquitaine	Haute-Vienne	39 : Saint-Hilaire-Bonneval	Saint-Hilaire-Bonneval, Saint-Paul, Saint-Priest-Ligoure	
Nouvelle-Aquitaine	Haute-Vienne	40 : Pierre-Buffière	Vicq-sur-Breuilh, Nexon, Château-Chervix, Pierre-Buffière, Saint-Priest-Ligoure	
Nouvelle-Aquitaine	Haute-Vienne	Aire de Briance-Ligoure		
Nouvelle-Aquitaine	Haute-Vienne	41 : Magnac-Bourg	Vicq-sur-Breuilh, Magnac-Bourg, Château-Chervix	
Nouvelle-Aquitaine	Haute-Vienne	42 : Saint-Germain-les-Belles	Saint-Germain-les-Belles, Meuzac, Saint-Yrieix-la-Perche, La Porcherie, Lac de Vassivière	
Nouvelle-Aquitaine	Corrèze	Aire de la Porte de Corrèze		
Nouvelle-Aquitaine	Corrèze	43 : Masseret	Masseret, La Porcherie, Chamberet, Salon-la-Tour	
Nouvelle-Aquitaine	Corrèze	44 : Beausoleil	Salon-la-Tour, Lubersac, Arnac-Pompadour, Uzerche	
Nouvelle-Aquitaine	Corrèze	45 : Les Balladours	Tulle, Aurillac, Uzerche, Seilhac, Vigeois, Arnac-Pompadour	
Nouvelle-Aquitaine	Corrèze	Aire du Puy de Grâce		
Nouvelle-Aquitaine	Corrèze	46 : Les Palisses	Perpezac-le-Noir, Sadroc	
Nouvelle-Aquitaine	Corrèze	A89 Eastbound - A20	Lyon, Clermont-Ferrand, Tulle, Saint-Germain-les-Vergnes	
Nouvelle-Aquitaine	Corrèze	E9 / A 20 becomes E9 / A 20 / E70 / A 89		
Nouvelle-Aquitaine	Corrèze	47 : Escudier	Donzenac, Sadroc	
Nouvelle-Aquitaine	Corrèze	48 : Donzenac	Donzenac, Allassac	
Nouvelle-Aquitaine	Corrèze	49 : Vergis	Tulle, Brive-la-Gaillarde - est, Malemort-sur-Corrèze, Ussac	
Nouvelle-Aquitaine	Corrèze	A89 Westbound - A20	Périgueux, Bordeaux, Sarlat-la-Canéda	
Nouvelle-Aquitaine	Corrèze	E9 / A 20 / E70 / A 89 becomes again E9 / A 20		
Nouvelle-Aquitaine	Corrèze	50 : Lintillac	Brive-la-Gaillarde - centre, Objat	
Nouvelle-Aquitaine	Corrèze	51 : Brive-la-Gaillarde - sud	Périgueux, Brive-la-Gaillarde - centre, ouest, Terrasson-Lavilledieu, Montignac-Lascaux, Lac du Causse	
Nouvelle-Aquitaine	Corrèze	52 : Noailles	Noailles, Collonges-la-Rouge, Beaulieu-sur-Dordogne, Saint-Céré	
Nouvelle-Aquitaine	Corrèze	53 : Nespouls	Cahors, Rodez, Cressensac, Nespouls	
Occitania	Lot	Aire de Pech Montat		
Occitania	Lot	54 : Martel	Gouffre de Padirac, Gramat, Rocamadour	Entry and exit only from Vierzon
Occitania	Lot	Péage de Gignac		
Occitania	Lot	55 : Souillac	Sarlat-la-Canéda, Beaulieu-sur-Dordogne, Souillac	
Occitania	Lot	56 : Labastide-Murat	Aurillac, Sarlat-la-Canéda, Rodez, Figeac-Decazeville, Saint-Céré, Gourdon, Gramat	
Occitania	Lot	Aire du Jardin des Causses du Lot		
Occitania	Lot	57 : Cahors - nord	Villeneuve-sur-Lot, Cahors - centre, Saint-Cirq-Lapopie	
Occitania	Lot	Aires de la Combe du Tréboulou		
Occitania	Lot	58 : Cahors - sud	Villeneuve-sur-Lot, Cahors - centre, Villefranche-de-Rouergue	
Occitania	Tarn-et-Garonne	Aire du Bois de Dourre		
Occitania	Tarn-et-Garonne	59 : Caussade	Rodez, Decazeville, Villefranche-de-Rouergue, Caussade, Saint-Antonin-Noble-Val	
Occitania	Tarn-et-Garonne	Péage de Montauban - nord		
Occitania	Tarn-et-Garonne	60 : Montauban - nord	Cahors, Rodez, Montauban - centre, Moissac, Albias,	
Occitania	Tarn-et-Garonne	61 : Montauban - Z. I. Nord	Montauban - Les Blancous, Saint-Antonin-Noble-Val, Nègrepelisse, Léojac, Lafrançaise	
Occitania	Tarn-et-Garonne	62 : Montauban - Les Chaumes	Monclar-de-Quercy, Léojac, Montauban	
Occitania	Tarn-et-Garonne	63 : Montauban - Beausoleil	Albi, Gaillac, Lisle-sur-Tarn, Montauban	
Occitania	Tarn-et-Garonne	64 : Montauban - Sapiac	Villebrumier, Montauban	
Occitania	Tarn-et-Garonne	65 : Montauban - Parages	Auch, Agen, Montauban - Villebourbon, centre, sud, Lafrançaise, Castelsarrasin, Montech	
Occitania	Tarn-et-Garonne	66 : Montauban - Parages	Castres, Villemur-sur-Tarn, Fronton, Bressols - centre, Z. A. Albasud	
Occitania	Tarn-et-Garonne	Aire de Nauze-Vert (Southbound)		
Occitania	Tarn-et-Garonne	67 : Bressols - Moulis	Z. A. Bressols, Montbartier	
Occitania	Tarn-et-Garonne	68 : Le Clos du Lac	Toulouse, Grisolles, Grenade, Verdun-sur-Garonne, Fronton, Villemur-sur-Tarn	
Occitania	Tarn-et-Garonne	Péage de Montauban - sud		
Occitania	Tarn-et-Garonne	A62 - A20	Toulouse, Bordeaux, Agen	
1.000 mi = 1.609 km; 1.000 km = 0.621 mi

== Village étape ==
The Autoroute is served by the following six Village étapes, Bessines-sur-Gartempe, Donzenac, Éguzon-Chantôme, Pierre-Buffière, Uzerche and Vatan.
