= A71 autoroute =

Road in France

A71 autoroute

Route information
- Part of E9 / E11 / E62 / E70 / E604
- Maintained by Cofiroute (between A10 and 7 ) APRR (between 7 and A75)
- Existed: 1973–present

Major junctions
- North end: E5 / E60 / A 10 in Ingré

- E60 / E604 / A 85 in Theillay; E9 / A 20 in Vierzon; A 714 in Bizeneuille; E62 / A 79 in Montmarault; A 719 in Gannat; E70 / A 89 in Combronde; E70 / A 89 / A 710 in Clermont-Ferrand

- South end: E11 / A 75 / A 711 in Clermont-Ferrand

Location
- Country: France
- Major cities: Orléans, Vierzon, Bourges, Montluçon, Gannat, Riom, Clermont-Ferrand

Highway system
- Roads in France; Autoroutes; Routes nationales

The A71 autoroute is a motorway in central France. It is also called l'Arverne. It starts at Orléans and ends at Clermont-Ferrand.

== History ==
=== Orléans to Bourges ===
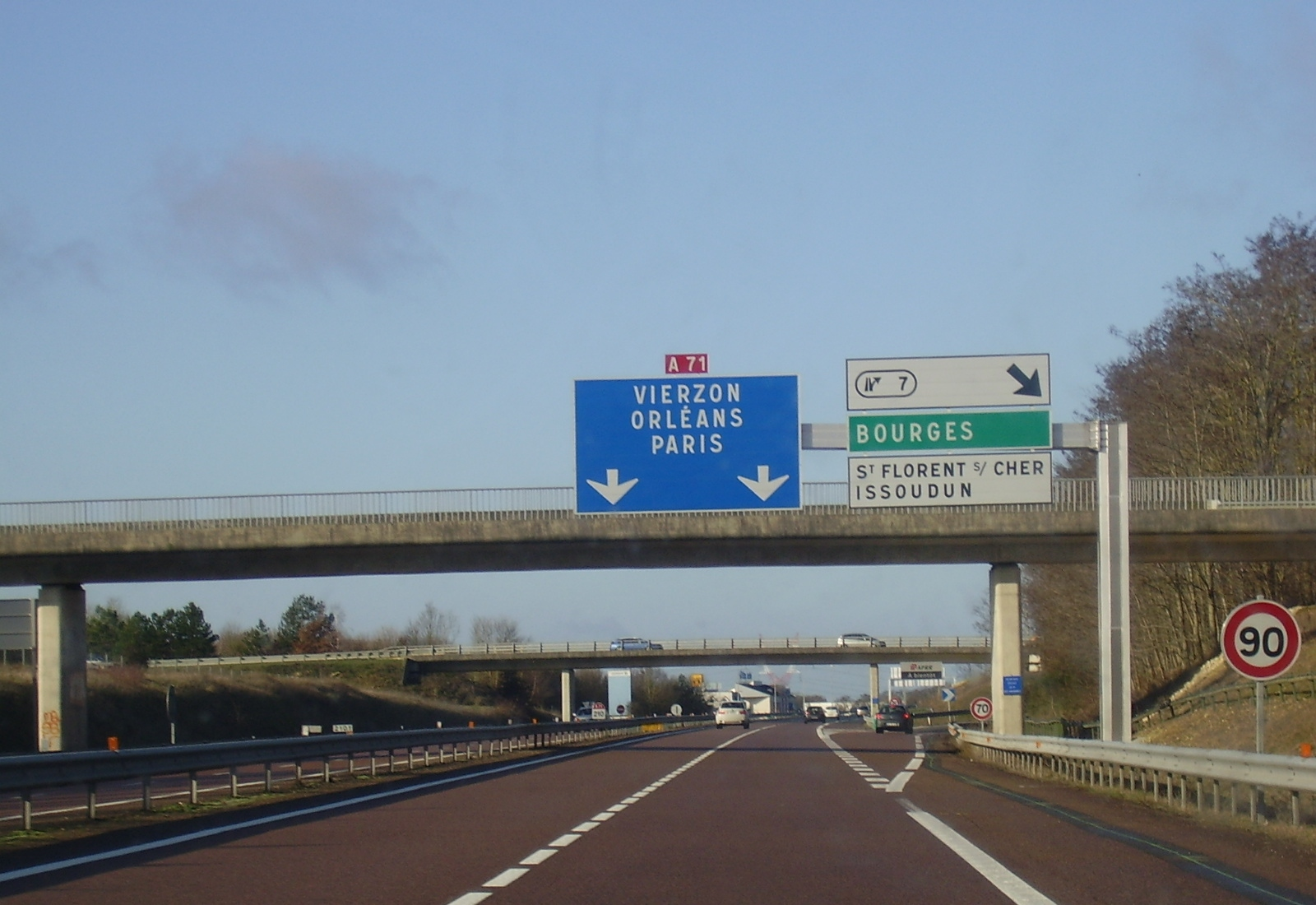
Exit 7 towards Paris in December 2009.

The autoroute is 2x2 lanes and is operated by the Société Cofiroute (Orléans-Bourges). The section between Orléans to Salbris was opened on 24 October 1986. In 1989 it was completed to Bourges.

=== Bourges to Clermont-Ferrand ===
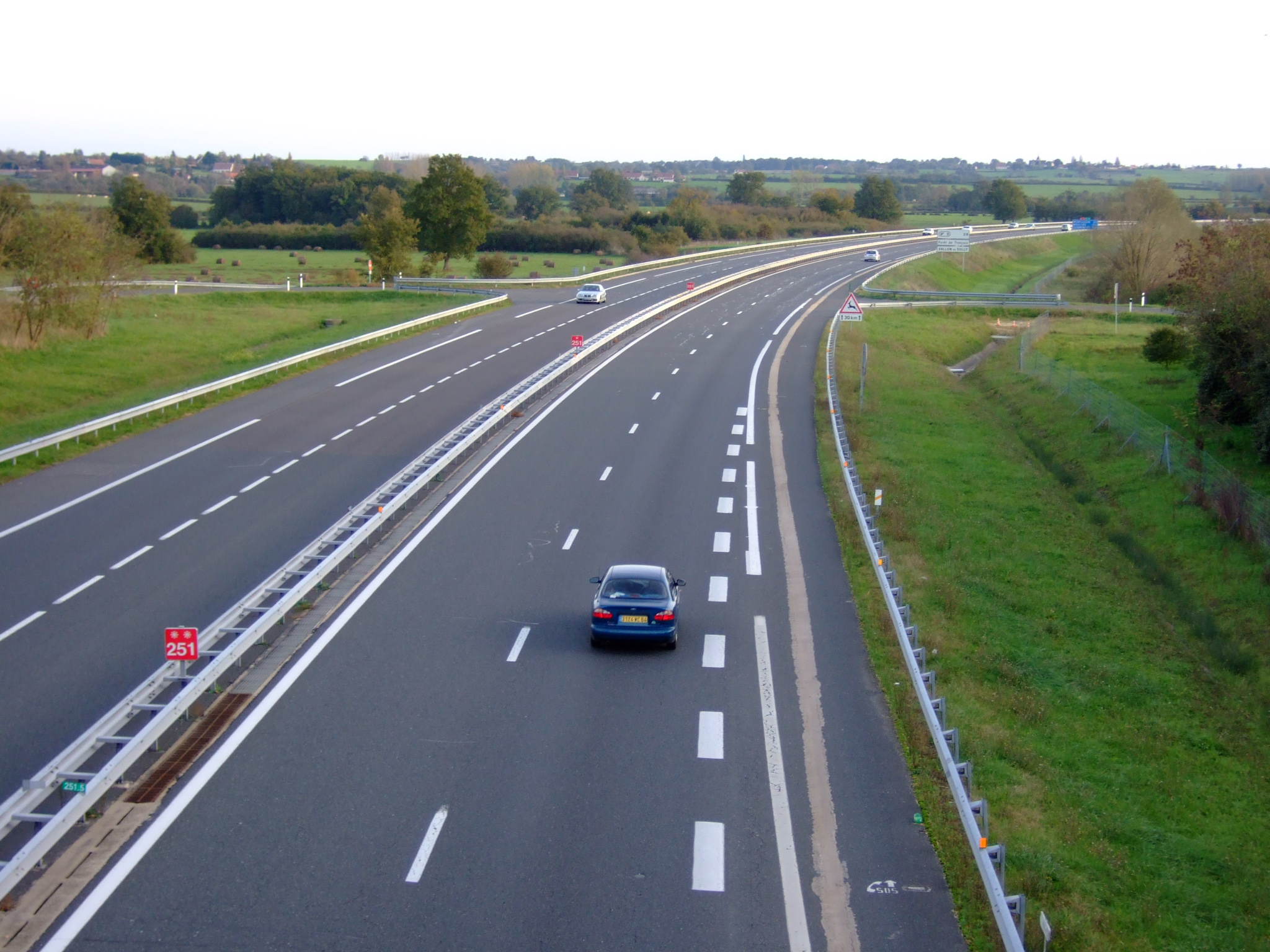
A71 autoroute near Saint-Amand-Montrond to Clermont-Ferrand

This section of the autoroute is operated by APRR. It is 2x2 lanes and a toll road. The road has the double numbering A71/A89 between Combronde and Gerzat.

- 1987 : The section between Montmarault and Clermont - Est (71 km) is opened.
- 1988 : The section between Forêt-de-Tronçais and Montmarault (38 km) is opened.
- 1989 : The opening of the section between Bourges and the Forêt-de-Tronçais (70 km)

== List of exits and junctions ==
Region	Department	Junction	Destinations	Notes
Centre-Val de Loire	Loiret	A10 - A71	Paris, Le Mans, Chartres, Fontainebleau, Orléans - nord Bordeaux, Tours, Blois	
Centre-Val de Loire	Loiret	1 : Orléans - centre	Orléans, La Chapelle-Saint-Mesmin, Saint-Jean-de-la-Ruelle	
Centre-Val de Loire	Loiret	2 : Olivet	La Ferté-Saint-Aubin, Olivet, Orléans - La Source, Orléans - Sologne (parcs d'activités)	
Centre-Val de Loire	Loiret	Aire de repos du Bois de Bailly (Southbound); Aire de repos du Bois du Télégraphe (Northbound)		
Centre-Val de Loire	Loir-et-Cher	Aire de service de Chaumont-sur-Tharonne (Southbound); Aire de service de La Ferté-Saint-Aubin (Northbound)		
Centre-Val de Loire	Loir-et-Cher	3 : Lamotte-Beuvron	Lamotte-Beuvron, La Ferté-Saint-Aubin, Nouan-le-Fuzelier, Neung-sur-Beuvron, Vouzon	
Centre-Val de Loire	Loir-et-Cher	Aire de repos de l’Étang du Maras (Southbound); Aire de repos de la Briganderie (Northbound)		
Centre-Val de Loire	Loir-et-Cher	Aire de repos des Maremberts (Southbound); Aire de repos de la Saulot (Northbound)		
Centre-Val de Loire	Loir-et-Cher	4 : Salbris	Salbris, Neung-sur-Beuvron, Romorantin-Lanthenay	
Centre-Val de Loire	Loir-et-Cher	Aire de service de Salbris-Theillay (Southbound); Aire de service de Salbris-la-Loge (Northbound)		
Centre-Val de Loire	Loir-et-Cher	A85 - A71	Nantes, Tours, Blois, Romorantin-Lanthenay	
Centre-Val de Loire	Cher	A20 - A71 ( 5 : Vierzon - nord )	Toulouse, Limoges, Châteauroux, Vierzon - centre	
Centre-Val de Loire	Cher	E9 / A 71 becomes E11 / A 71		
Centre-Val de Loire	Cher	6 : Vierzon - est	Vierzon, Mehun-sur-Yèvre	
Centre-Val de Loire	Cher	Aire de repos de Quincy (Southbound); Aire de repos de la Chaussée de César (Northbound)		
Centre-Val de Loire	Cher	Aire de service de Bourges - Sainte-Thorette (Southbound); Aire de service de Bourges - Marmagne (Northbound)		
Centre-Val de Loire	Cher	7 : Bourges	Bourges, Issoudun, Saint-Florent-sur-Cher, Saint-Doulchard, Nevers	
Centre-Val de Loire	Cher	Aire de repos du Gîte aux Loups (Southbound); Aire de repos du Bois des Dames (Northbound)		
Centre-Val de Loire	Cher	Aire de service du Centre de la France (Farges-Allichamps) (Southbound); Aire de service du Centre de la France (Bruère-Allichamps) (Northbound)		
Centre-Val de Loire	Cher	8 : Saint-Amand-Montrond	Saint-Amand-Montrond, Châteauroux	
Auvergne-Rhône-Alpes	Allier	Aire de repos du Grand Meaulnes (Southbound); Aire de repos de Vallon (Northbound)		
Auvergne-Rhône-Alpes	Allier	9 : Forêt de Troncais	Vallon-en-Sully, Montluçon	
Auvergne-Rhône-Alpes	Allier	A714 - A71 ( 10 : Montluçon )	Guéret (RN 145), Montluçon	
Auvergne-Rhône-Alpes	Allier	E11 / A 71 becomes E11 / E62 / A 71		
Auvergne-Rhône-Alpes	Allier	Aire de service de l'Allier (Doyet) (Southbound); Aire de service de l'Allier (Saulzet) (Northbound)		
Auvergne-Rhône-Alpes	Allier	A79 - A71 + 11 : Montmarault	Mâcon, Moulins, Bourbon-l'Archambault	
Auvergne-Rhône-Alpes	Allier	A79 - A71 + 11 : Montmarault	Montmarault, Commentry, Saint-Pourçain-sur-Sioule, Saint-Éloy-les-Mines	
Auvergne-Rhône-Alpes	Allier	E11 / E62 / A 71 becomes again E11 / A 71		
Auvergne-Rhône-Alpes	Allier	Aire de repos de la Bouble (Southbound); Aire de repos de Chantelle-en-Bourbonnais (Northbound)		
Auvergne-Rhône-Alpes	Allier	A719 - A71 ( 12 : Gannat )	Ébreuil, Vichy, Gannat, Saint-Pourçain-sur-Sioule	
Auvergne-Rhône-Alpes	Puy-de-Dôme			
Auvergne-Rhône-Alpes	Puy-de-Dôme	Aire de service des Volcans d'Auvergne		
Auvergne-Rhône-Alpes	Puy-de-Dôme	12.1 : Combronde	Combronde, Saint-Éloy-les-Mines	
Auvergne-Rhône-Alpes	Puy-de-Dôme	A89 Westbound - A71	Bordeaux, Limoges	
Auvergne-Rhône-Alpes	Puy-de-Dôme	E11 / A 71 overlaps and becomes E11 / A 71 / E70 / A 89		
Auvergne-Rhône-Alpes	Puy-de-Dôme	Aire de repos de Montpertuis (Southbound); Aire de repos de Pessat-Villeneuve (Northbound)		
Auvergne-Rhône-Alpes	Puy-de-Dôme	13 : Riom	Riom, Volvic, Châtel-Guyon	
Auvergne-Rhône-Alpes	Puy-de-Dôme	Péage de Gerzat (Clermont Barrière)		
Auvergne-Rhône-Alpes	Puy-de-Dôme	14 : Gerzat	Gerzat, Z. I. Ladoux	
Auvergne-Rhône-Alpes	Puy-de-Dôme	A89 Eastbound - A71 + 15 : Clermont-Ferrand - nord (A710)	Lyon, Thiers, Saint-Étienne (A72)	
Auvergne-Rhône-Alpes	Puy-de-Dôme	A89 Eastbound - A71 + 15 : Clermont-Ferrand - nord (A710)	Clermont-Ferrand - Quartiers Nord	
Auvergne-Rhône-Alpes	Puy-de-Dôme	E11 / A 71 / E70 / A 89 becomes again E11 / A 71		
Auvergne-Rhône-Alpes	Puy-de-Dôme	16 : Clermont-Ferrand - Le Brézet	Clermont-Ferrand - Quartiers Est, Aulnat, C.H.R.U	
Auvergne-Rhône-Alpes	Puy-de-Dôme	A711 - A75 & A71	Lyon (A89), Saint-Étienne, Thiers	
E11 / A 71 becomes E11 / A 75
1.000 mi = 1.609 km; 1.000 km = 0.621 mi

== The Spur Autoroutes ==
=== A719 ===
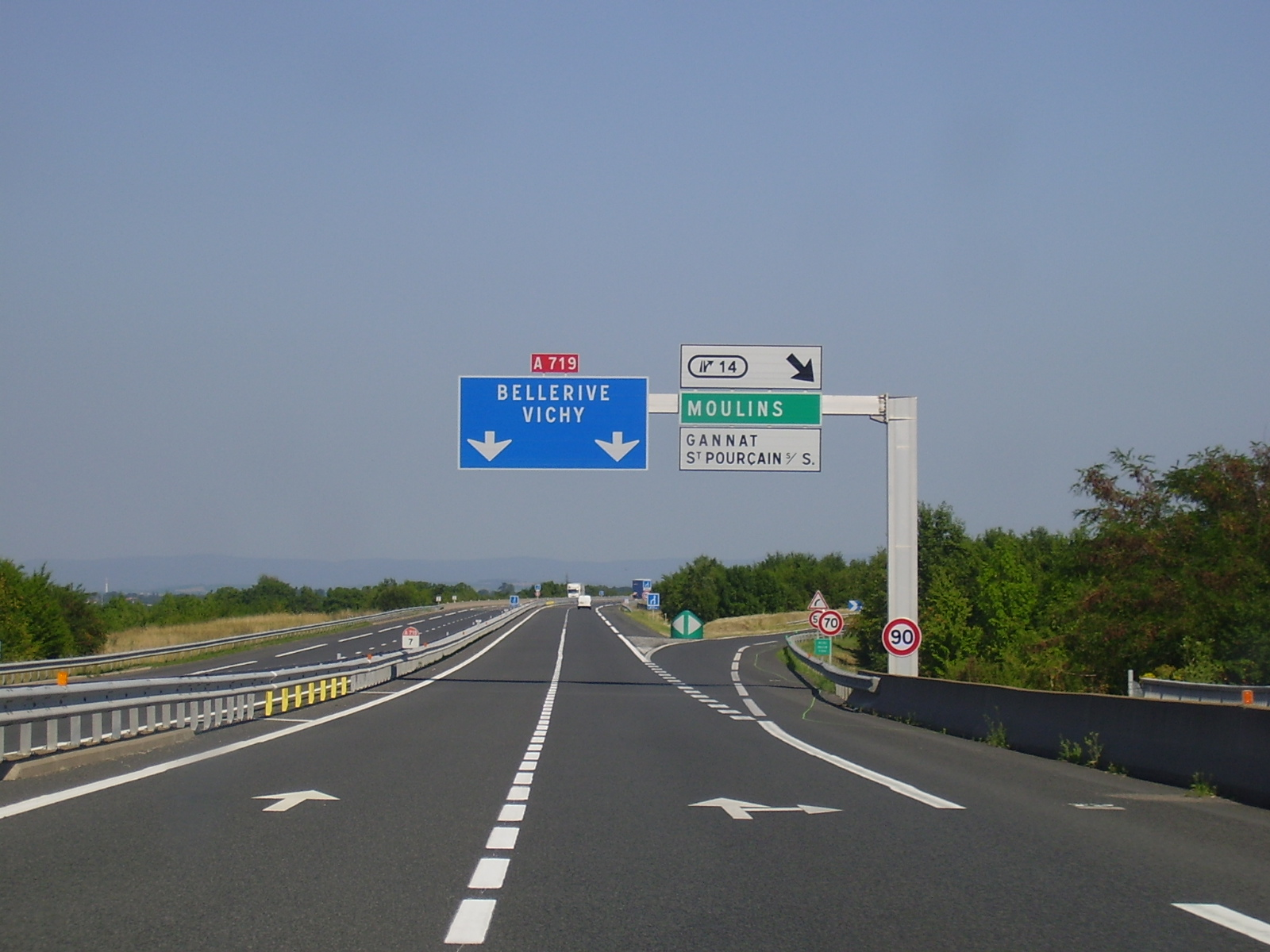
A719 towards Vichy in July 2009.

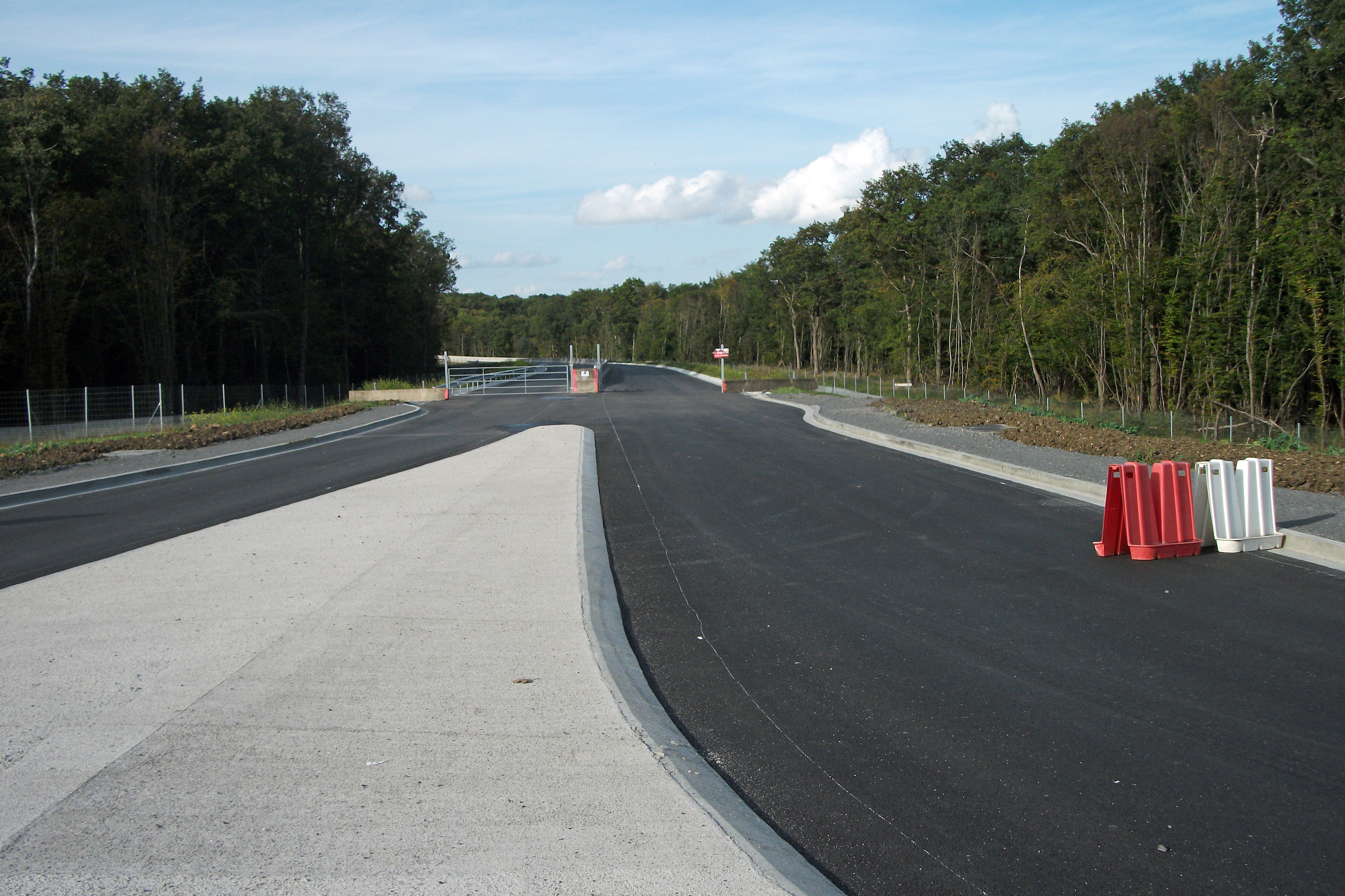
Three months before opening, the new terminus of A719 autoroute.

Opened in 1997, first section of this motorway bypasses Gannat by north (9 km). The highway was extended to the gates of Vichy, precisely on a roundabout at Espinasse-Vozelle; this 14 km section, inaugurated 9 January, was opened on 12 January 2015.

- Exchange A71-A719
- 13, km 1 Towns served: Ébreuil and Gannat
- 14, km 6 Towns served: Gannat and Saint-Pourçain-sur-Sioule 24 km
- 15, km 9 Towns served: Gannat and Vichy

There are proposals to extend the autoroute beyond Vichy to form part of the A77 to (Moulins-Roanne).

=== A710 ===
Former autoroute opened in 1998 (7 km long). Junctions are:

- Exchange A71-A710 Junction with the A710
- Exchange A89-A710 Junction with the A89 (7 km)

=== A711 ===
- Exchange A75-A711 Junction with the A75
- 1.3 km 4 Towns served: Lempdes
- 1.4 km 5 Towns served: Pont-du-Château
- Exchange A89-A711 Junction with the A89 (11 km)

=== A712 ===
This motorway, 1 km long and with reduced features, connects the exit 1.4 of A711 at the roundabout of Champ-Lamet between Lempdes and Pont-du-Château, at the crossroads with three other departmental roads.

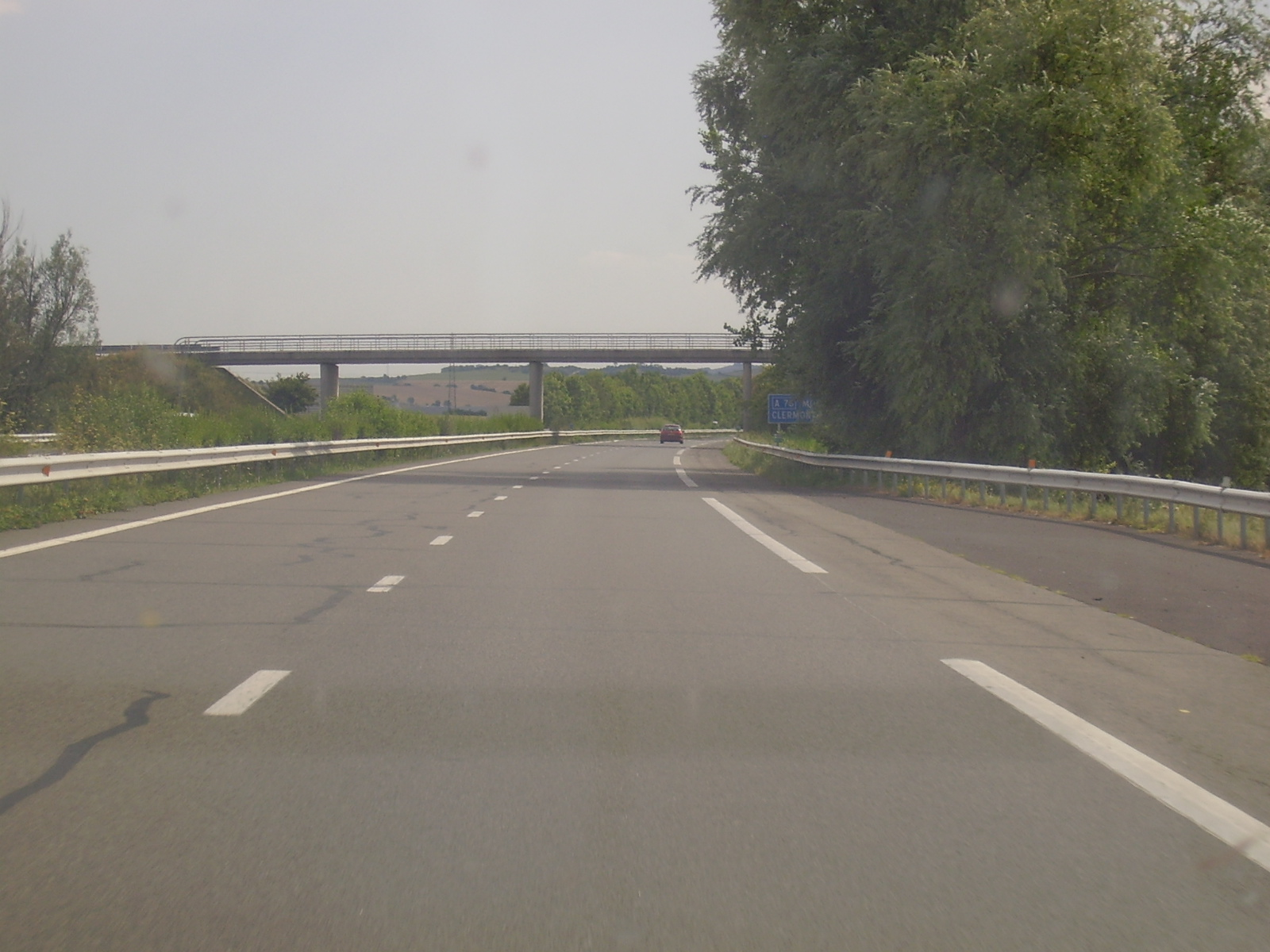
A711 towards Clermont-Ferrand (August 2009)

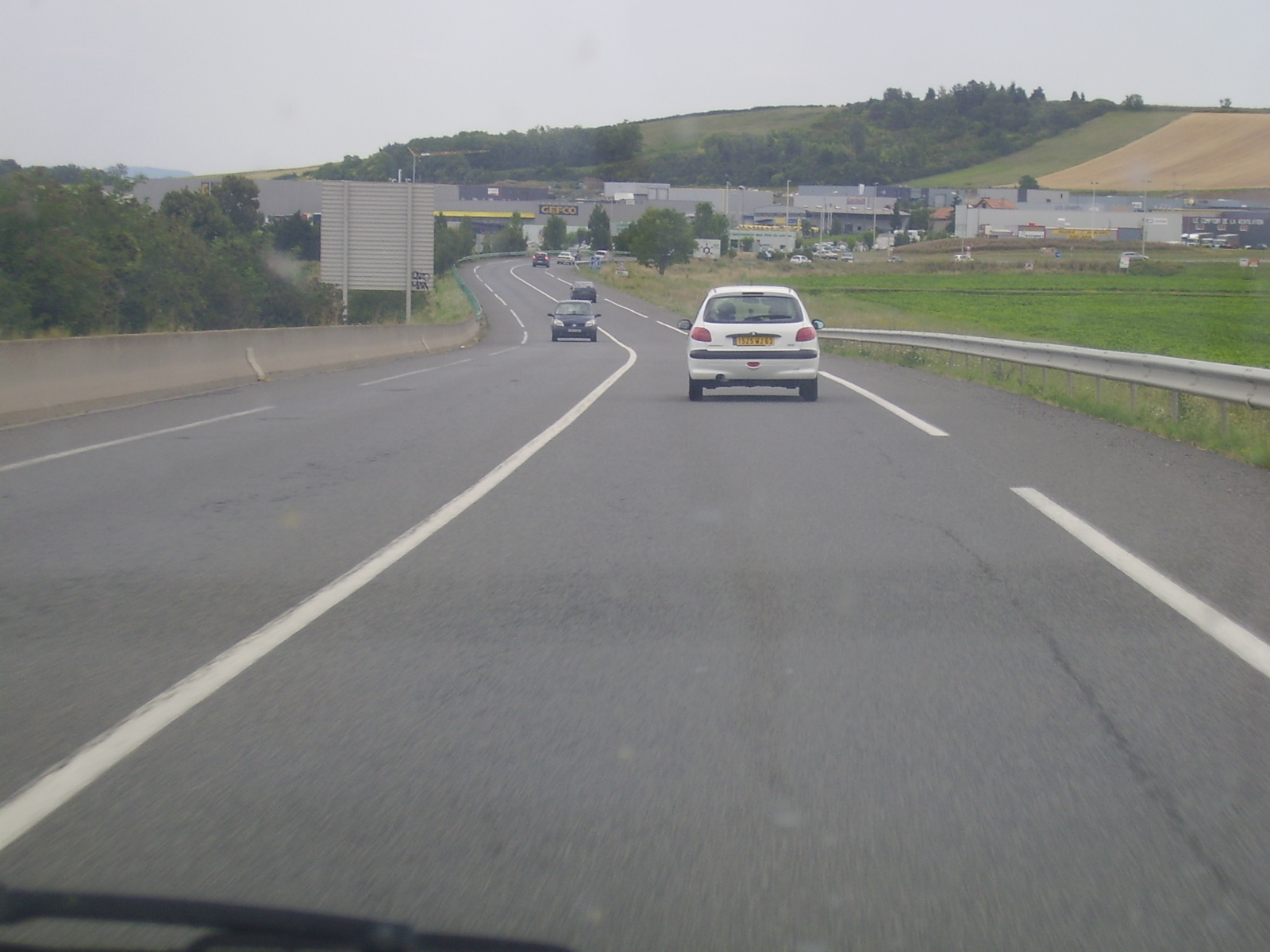
A712 autoroute

=== A714 ===
Motorway connecting the A71 with the traffic ring of Montluçon.
