= European route E70 =

Road in trans-European E-road network

E70

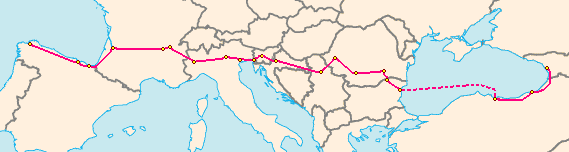

Major junctions
- West end: A Coruña, Spain
- East end: Poti, Georgia

Location
- Countries: Spain; France; Italy; Slovenia; Croatia; Serbia; Romania; Bulgaria; Turkey; Georgia

Highway system
- International E-road network; A Class; B Class

European route E70 is an A-Class West-East European route, extending from A Coruña in Spain in the west to the Georgian city of Poti in the east.

== Itinerary ==
The E 70 routes through ten European countries, and includes one (not currently operational) sea-crossing, from Varna in Bulgaria to Samsun in Turkey.

Spain

- A-6: A Coruña ( E1) - Baamonde
- A-8: Baamonde - Gijón - Torrelavega - Bilbao
- AP-8: Bilbao ( E804) - Eibar ( E5 E80)
- AP-1 / AP-8: Eibar (Start of Concurrency with E5 E80) - Donostia/San Sebastián - Irún

France

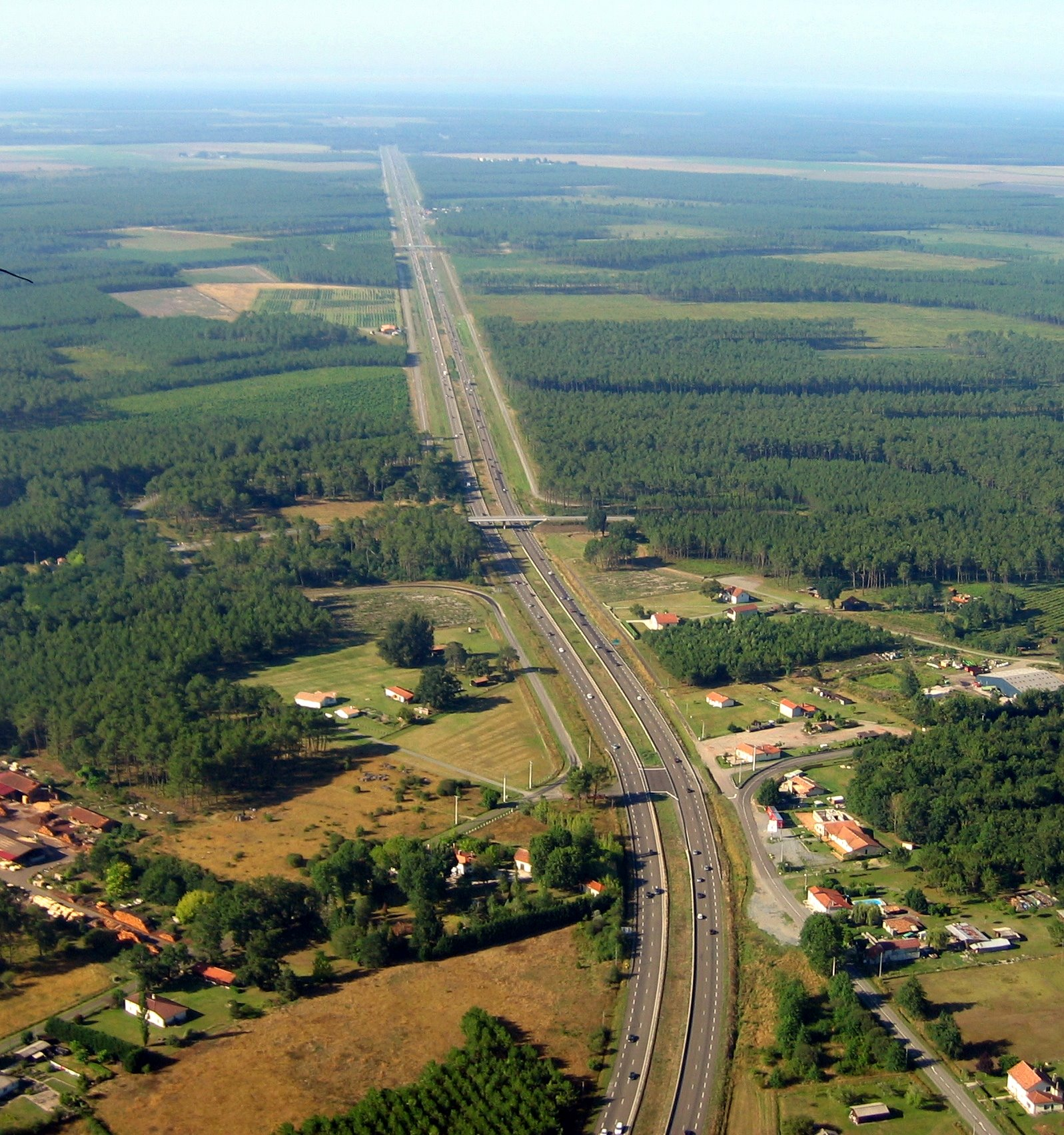
E 70 (national motorway A 63) in the North of the Landes in France.

- A 63: Hendaye - Bayonne (End of Concurrency with E80) - Bordeaux
- A 630: Bordeaux ( E72)
- N 230: Bordeaux (End of Concurrency with E5)
- N 89: Bordeaux ( E5) - Libourne
- A 89: Libourne - Brive-la-Gaillarde ( E9)
- A 20: Brive-la-Gaillarde ( E9) - Saint-Germain-les-Vergnes ( E9)
- A 89: Saint-Germain-les-Vergnes ( E9 - Combronde ( E11)
- A 71: Combronde ( E11) - Clermont-Ferrand ( E11)
- A 89: Clermont-Ferrand ( E11) - Balbigny - Limonest
- A 6: Limonest - Les Chères
- A 466: Les Chères - Ambérieux
- A 46: Ambérieux - Miribel ( E15)
- A 432: Miribel - Saint-Laurent-de-Mure
- A 43: Lyon (Start of Concurrency with E711) - Bourgoin-Jallieu (End of Concurrency with E711) - Chambéry ( E712)
- N 201: Chambéry ( E712)
- A 43: Chambéry ( E712) - Modane
- N 543: Modane

Italy

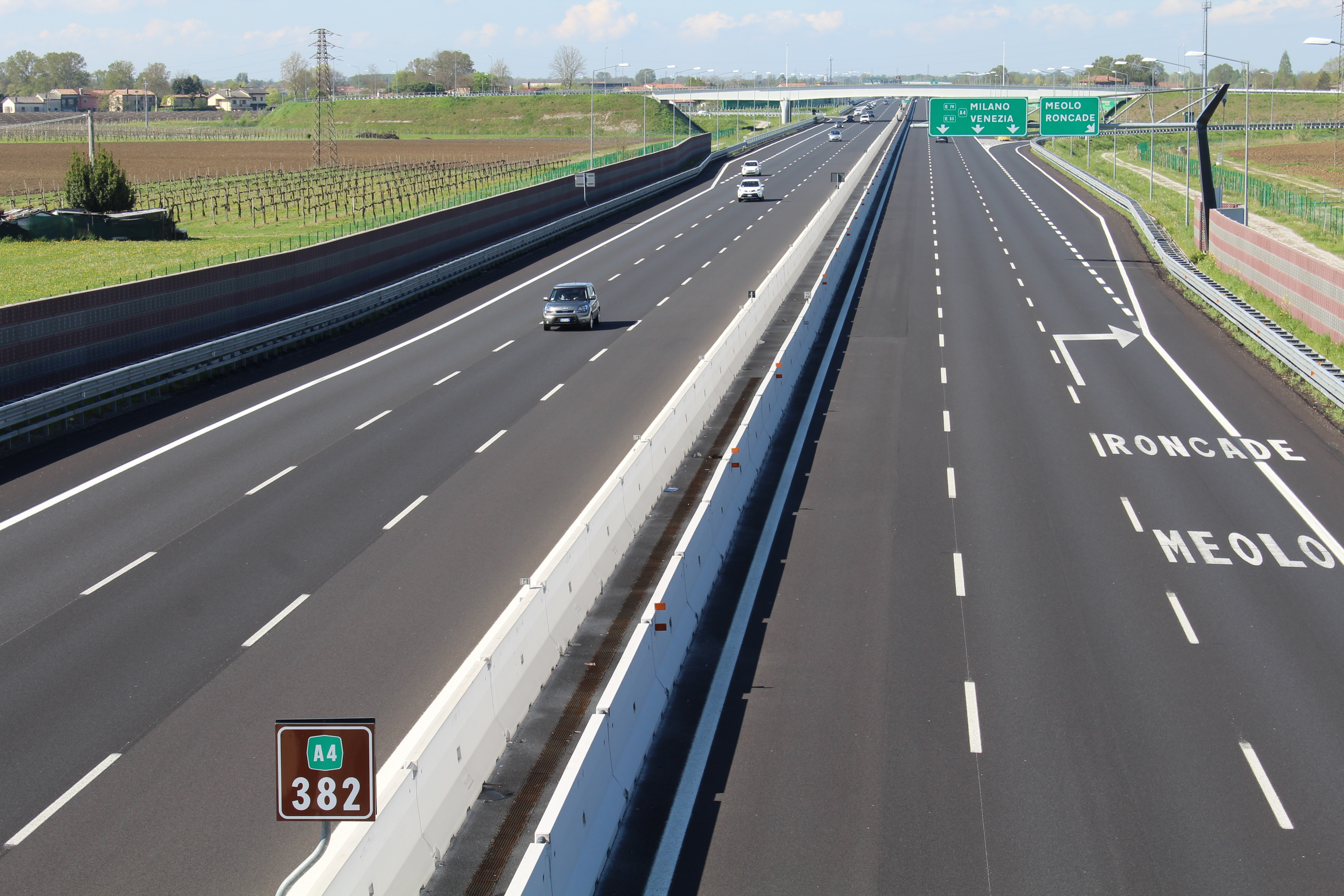
E 70 (national motorway A4) near Meolo in Italy.

- T 4: Bardonecchia
- A 32: Bardonecchia - Turin
- A 55: Turin ( E64 E612 E717)
- A 21: Turin ( E717) - Asti (Start of concurrency with E74) - Alessandria ( E25, End of concurrency with E74) - Tortona ( E62) - Piacenza ( E35) - Brescia ( E64)
- A 4: Brescia ( E64) - Verona ( E45) - Venice (Start of concurrency with E55) - Palmanova (End of concurrency with E55) - Sistiana
- RA 13: Sistiana - Trieste
- RA 14: Trieste (Start of concurrency with E61)

Slovenia

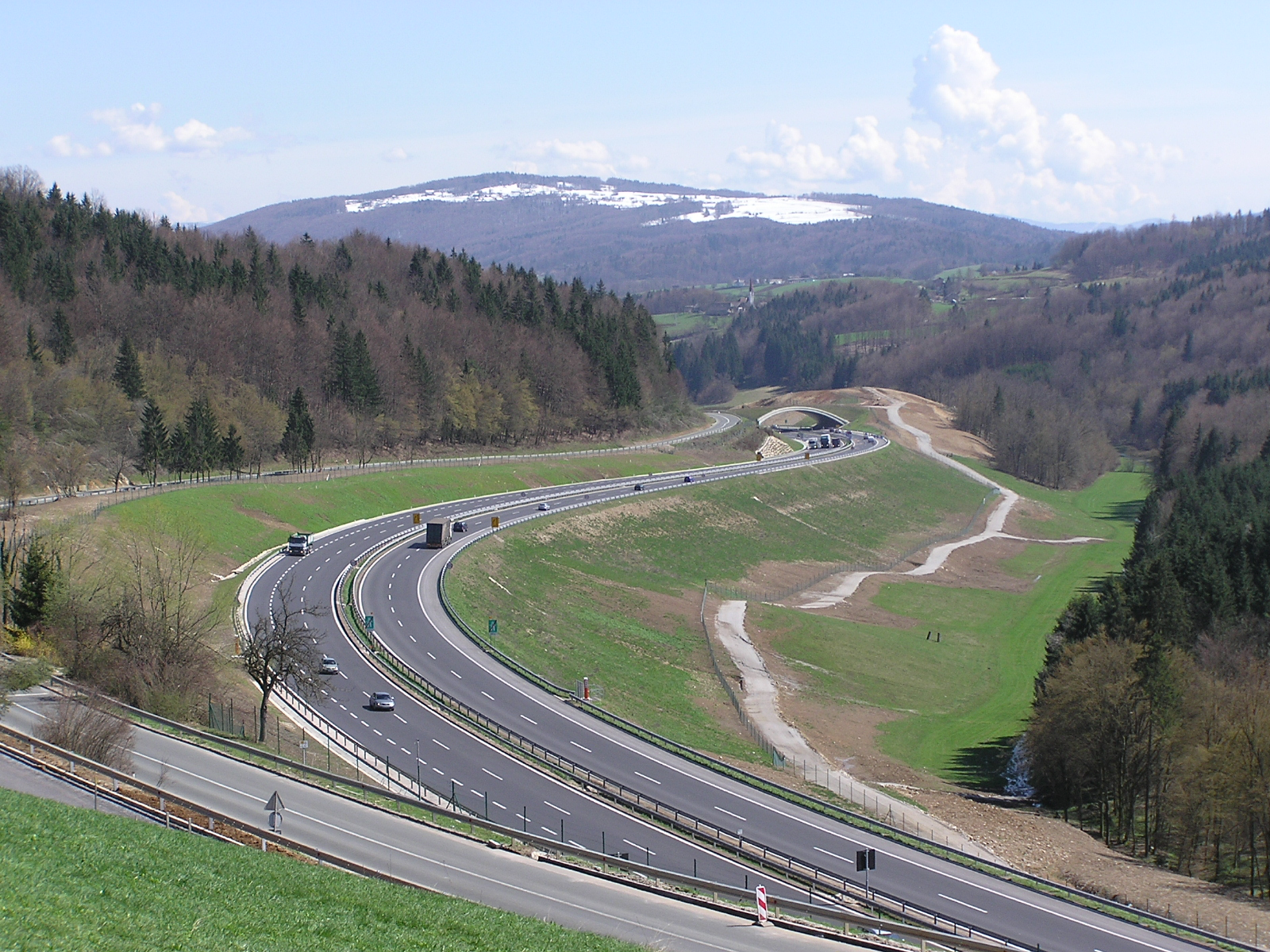
E 70 (national motorway A1) near Medvedjek slope in Slovenia.

- A3: Sežana - Divača
- A1: Divača - Ljubljana (End of concurrency with E61)
- A1 / A2: (Ljubljana Ring Road ( E57 E61)
- A2: Ljubljana ( E57) - Čatež ob Savi

Croatia

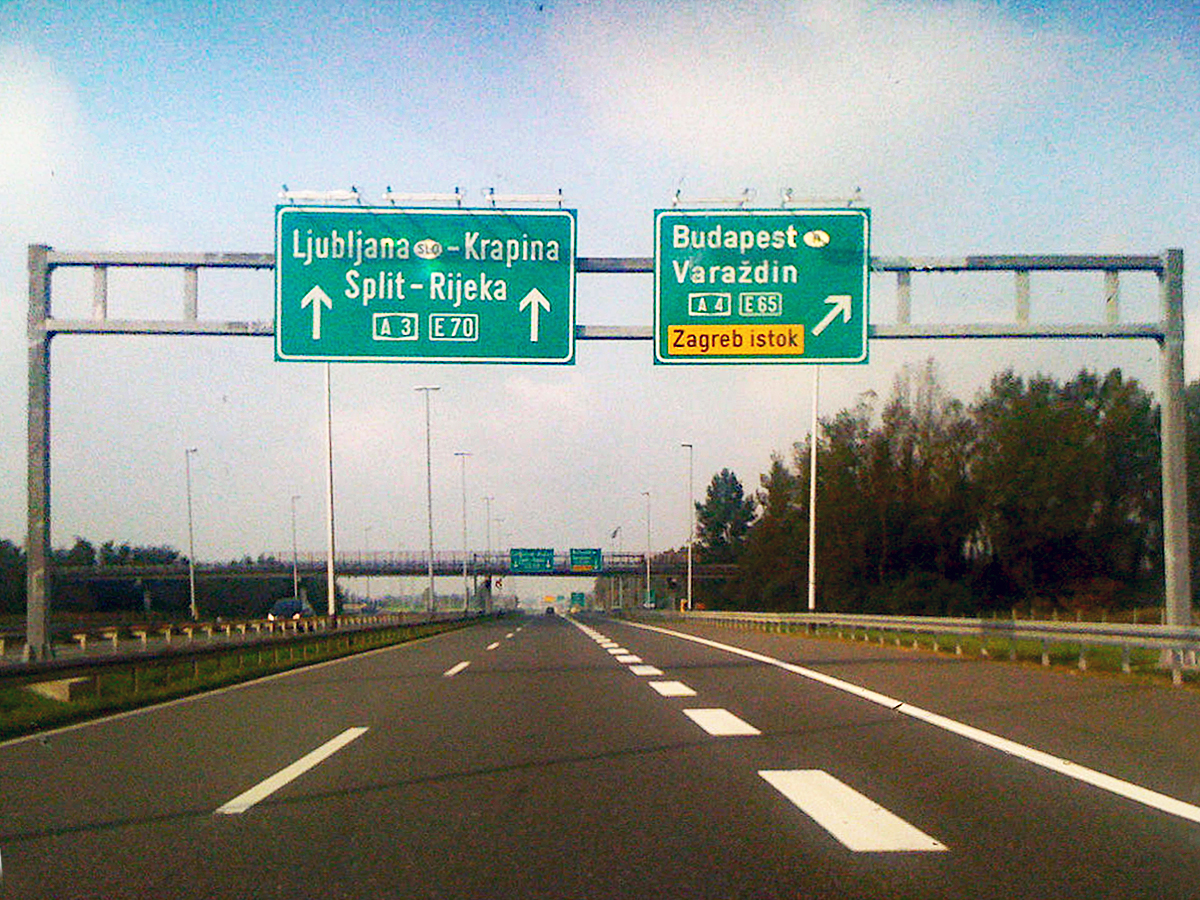
E 70 (national motorway A3) near Ivanja Reka interchange in Croatia.

- A3: Bregana - Zagreb (Zagreb bypass E59 E65 E71) - Okučani ( E661) - Slavonski Brod - Donji Andrijevci ( E73) - Lipovac

Serbia

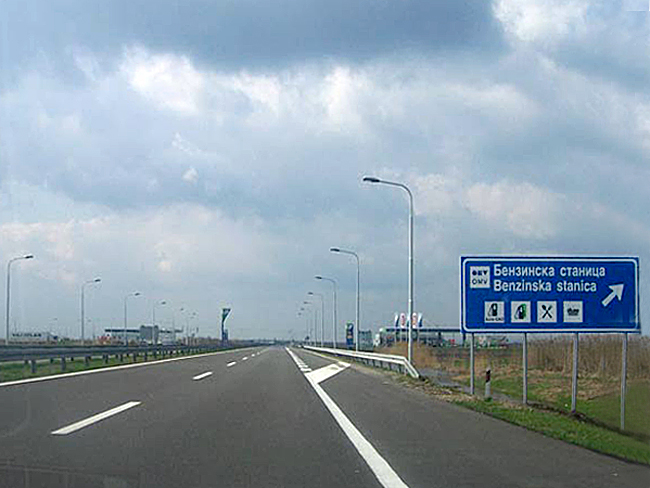
E 70 (national motorway A3) in Serbia.

- A3: Batrovci - Belgrade ( E75 E763)
- 10: Belgrade - Vatin

Romania

- DN59: Moravița - Timișoara ( E671)
- DN6: Timișoara ( E671) - Lugoj ( E673) - Drobeta-Turnu Severin ( E771) - Filiași ( E79) - Craiova ( E79 E574) - Alexandria - București
- DNCB: București ( E85, Towards E60 E81 E85)
- DN5: București (Start of concurrency with E85) - Giurgiu

Bulgaria

- I-2: Ruse (End of concurrency with E85) - Shumen ( E772)
- A 2: Shumen ( E772) - Varna
- I-2: Varna ( E87)

Gap (Black Sea)

- (Bulgaria) Varna - (Turkey) Samsun; no direct ferry link; ferry to Poti at east end of E70

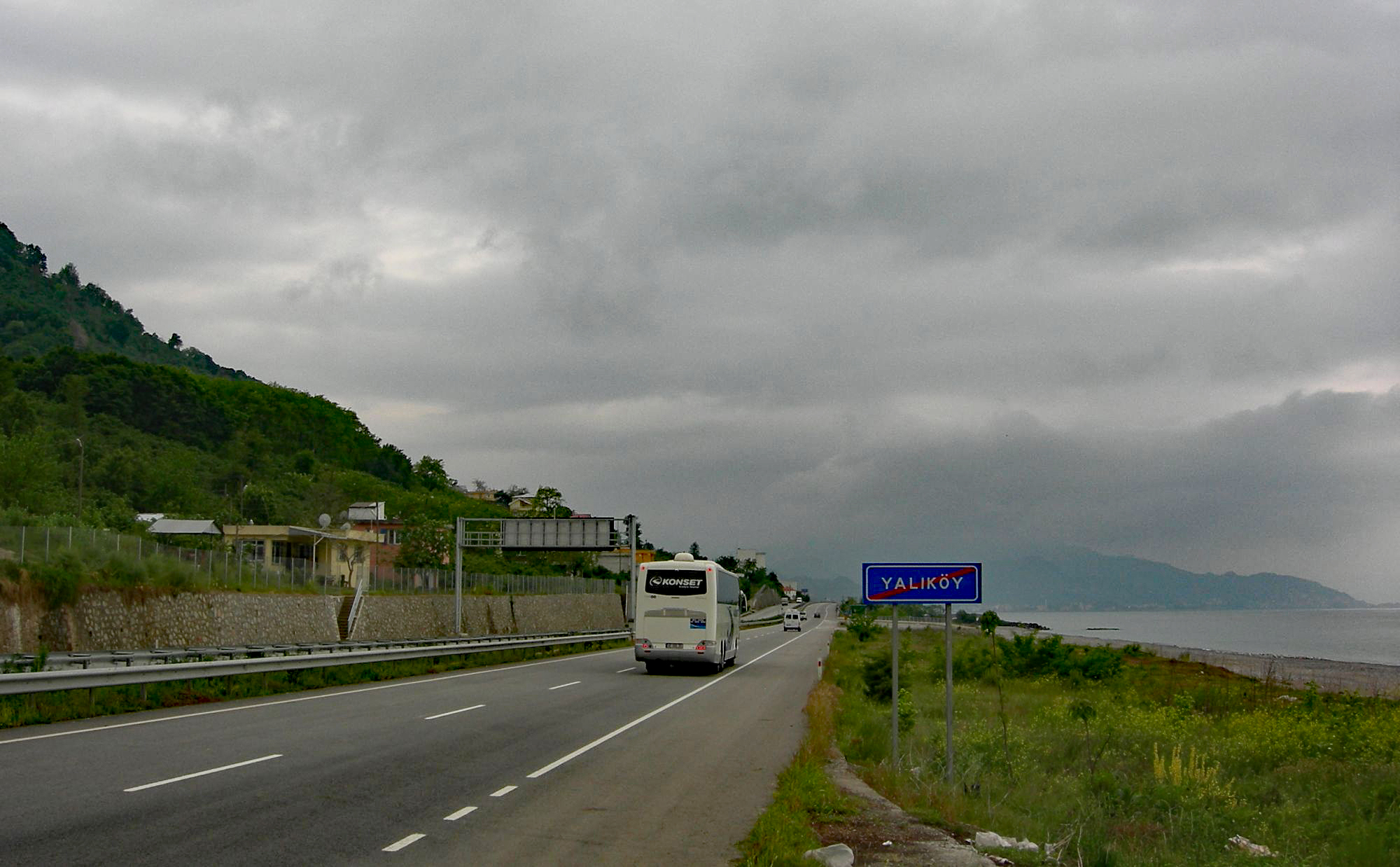
Near the Black Sea at Yalıköy, Fatsa, Turkey

Turkey

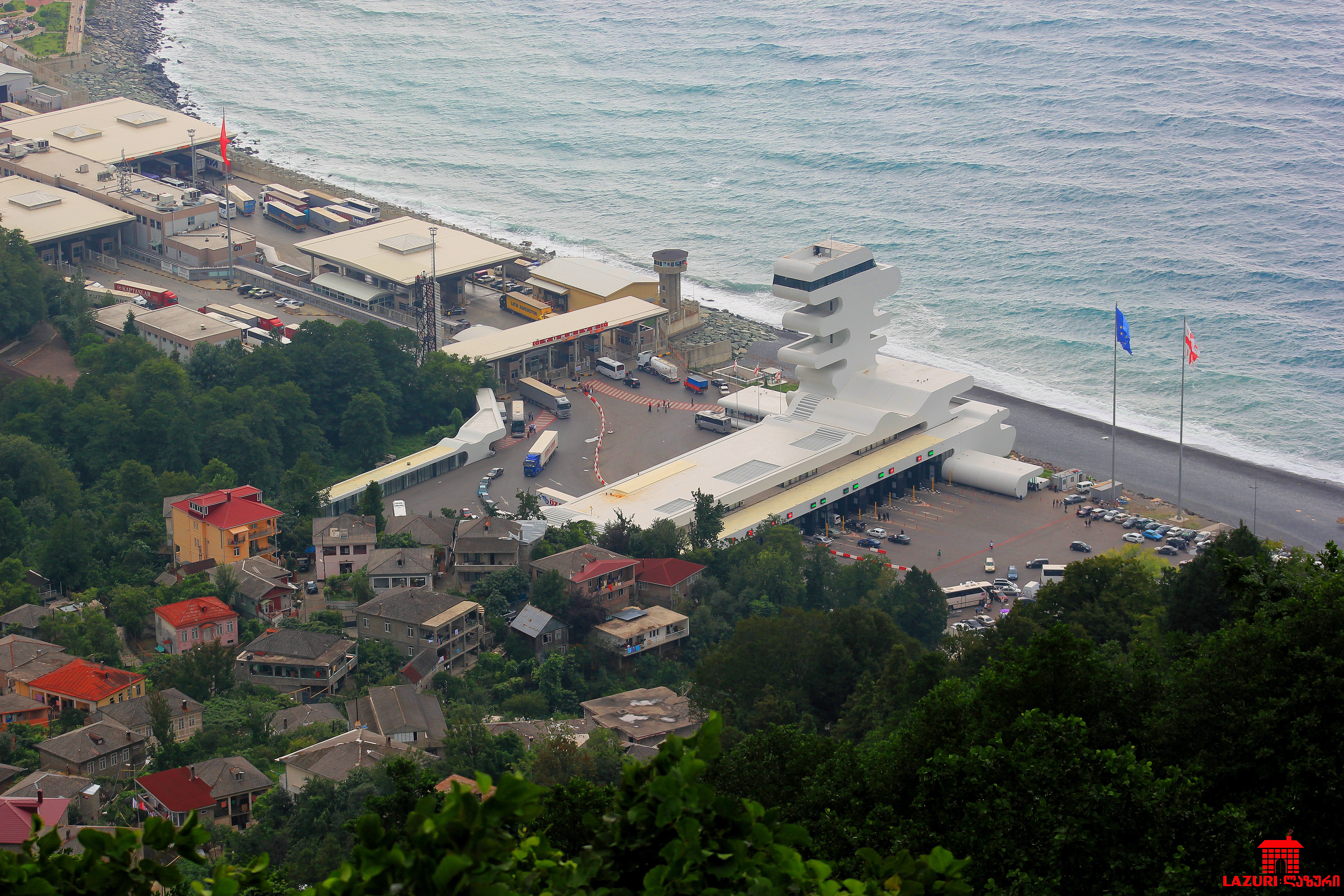
Turkish-Georgian Border in Sarpi

- D.010: Samsun ( E95) - Ordu - Giresun - Trabzon (Start of Concurrency with E97) - Hopa

Georgia

- ს 2: Sarpi - Batumi - Kobuleti ( E692) - Poti ( E60, End of Concurrency with E97)
