= A72 autoroute =

Road in France

A72 autoroute

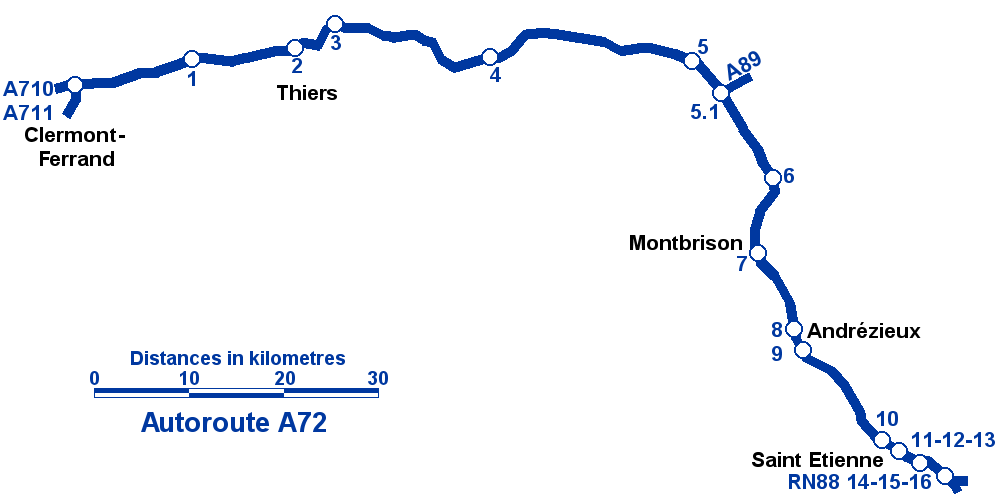

Route information
- Length: 55 km (34 mi)

Major junctions
- From: E70 / A 89 in Nervieux

- To: N 88 in Saint-Étienne

Location
- Country: France

Highway system
- Roads in France; Autoroutes; Routes nationales

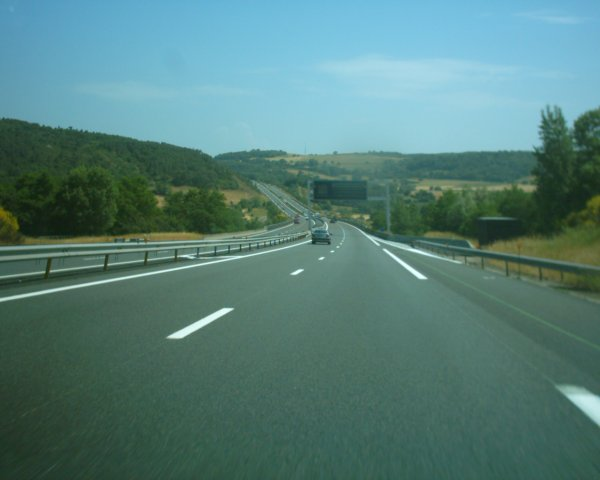
The A72 Eastbound in the steep section of the motorway.

The A72 is an autoroute (motorway) in France. It is 55 kilometres (34 mi) long.

The motorway is operated by Autoroutes du Sud de la France (ASF) and links Balbigny to Saint-Étienne on one of the steepest and meandrous motorways in France. Over 35 km (22 mi) of the motorway is limited to 110 km/h (70 mph) as sections are considered too dangerous for the standard 130 km/h (80 mph) speed limit.

The motorway has 2 lanes both directions with 3 lane sections near Saint-Étienne.

The road is also numbered the European route E70. In 2006, the section between Clermont-Ferrand and the A89 spur became part of the A89.

== List of exits and junctions ==
Region	Department	Junction	Destinations	Notes
Auvergne-Rhône-Alpes	Loire	A89 - A72	Clermont-Ferrand, Thiers, Roanne, Lyon (A6)	
Auvergne-Rhône-Alpes	Loire	6 : Feurs	Feurs, Boën	
Auvergne-Rhône-Alpes	Loire	Aire de la Plaine du Forez		
Auvergne-Rhône-Alpes	Loire	7 : Montrond	Montrond-les-Bains, Montbrison	
Auvergne-Rhône-Alpes	Loire	Aire de Chante-Perdrix (Southbound); Aire des Chaninats (Northbound)		
Auvergne-Rhône-Alpes	Loire	Péage de la Veauchette		
Auvergne-Rhône-Alpes	Loire	8 : Andrézieux-Bouthéon	Thiers, Roanne par RD, Montrond-les-Bains, Veauche, Saint-Étienne-Loire Airport Andrézieux-Bouthéon	Entry and exit from Saint-Étienne
Auvergne-Rhône-Alpes	Loire	9 : La Fouillouse	Saint-Just-Saint-Rambert, La Fouillouse, Aéroport de Saint-Étienne-Loire, Opéra Parcs, Autres Zones	
Auvergne-Rhône-Alpes	Loire	10 : Saint-Etienne - ouest	Saint-Étienne, La Fouillouse, Firminy, Annonay, Le Puy-en-Velay, Villars, Bellevue, Hôpital Nord	
Auvergne-Rhône-Alpes	Loire	11 : Saint-Priest-en-Jarez	Saint-Étienne, Saint-Priest-en-Jarez	
Auvergne-Rhône-Alpes	Loire	12: Saint-Étienne - La Terrasse	Saint-Étienne - centre, Saint-Priest-en-Jarez, Villars, L’Étrat	
Auvergne-Rhône-Alpes	Loire	13 : Saint-Étienne - Montreynaud	Saint-Étienne, Technopole	
Auvergne-Rhône-Alpes	Loire	14 : La Talaudière	Saint-Étienne, La Talaudière, Stade Geoffroy-Guichard, Zénith-Cité du Design, Z. I. Molina	
Auvergne-Rhône-Alpes	Loire	15 : Saint-Etienne - Méons	Saint-Étienne, Sorbiers	
Auvergne-Rhône-Alpes	Loire	16 : Saint-Jean-Bonnefonds	Saint-Jean-Bonnefonds, Monthieu, Terrenoire	
Auvergne-Rhône-Alpes	Loire	RN 488 - A72	Saint-Chamond, Valence, Lyon (A7)	
Auvergne-Rhône-Alpes	Loire	17 : Saint-Étienne - Monthieu	Saint-Jean-Bonnefonds, Saint-Étienne, Centres Commerciaux	
Auvergne-Rhône-Alpes	Loire	RN 88 - A72	Le Puy-en-Velay, Annonay, Firminy, Saint-Étienne - Autres-Quartiers	
1.000 mi = 1.609 km; 1.000 km = 0.621 mi
