= Arveyres =

- Commune
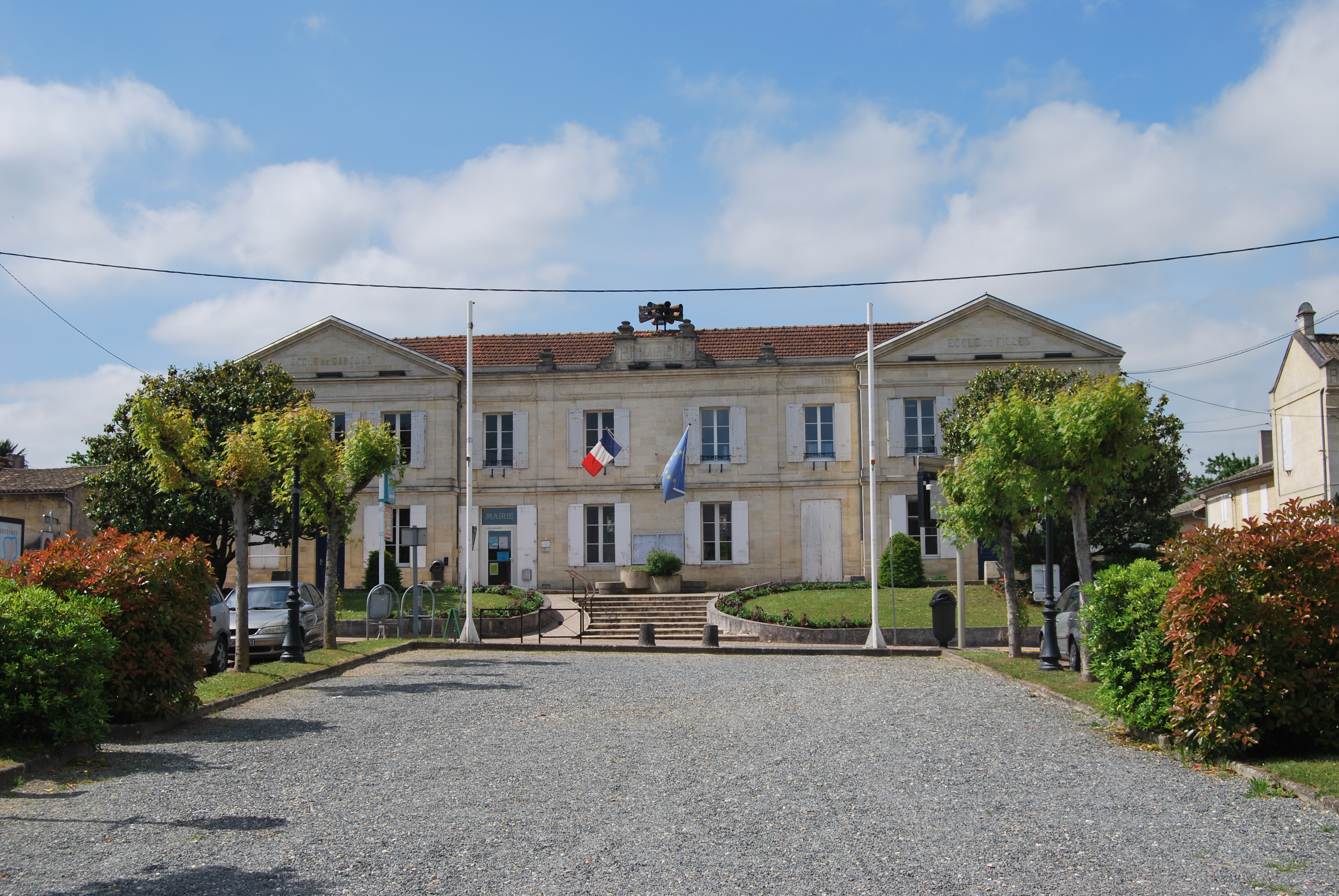
- The town hall in Arveyres

- Coat of arms
- Location of Arveyres
- Location within France Location within Nouvelle-Aquitaine
- Coordinates: 44°53′06″N 0°16′56″W
- Country: France
- Region: Nouvelle-Aquitaine
- Department: Gironde
- Arrondissement: Libourne
- Canton: Le Libournais-Fronsadais
- Intercommunality: CA Libournais

Government
  - Mayor (2020–2026): Bernard Guilhem
- Area^{1}: 17.27 km^{2} (6.67 sq mi)
- Elevation: 9 m (30 ft)
- Highest elevation: 41 m (135 ft)
- Lowest elevation: 1 m (3.3 ft)
- Population (2023): 2,056
  - Density: 119.1/km^{2} (308.3/sq mi)
- Time zone: UTC+01:00 (CET)
  - Summer (DST): UTC+02:00 (CEST)
- INSEE/Postal code: 33015 /33500
- ^{1} French Land Register data, which excludes lakes, ponds, glaciers > 1 km^{2} (0.386 sq mi or 247 acres) and river estuaries.

Arveyres (French pronunciation: [aʁvˈɛjʁ]; Occitan: Arvèiras) is a commune in the Gironde department in southwestern France.

== Population ==
Historical population
Year	Pop.	±% p.a.
1968	1,726	—
1975	1,757	+0.25%
1982	1,849	+0.73%
1990	1,819	−0.20%
1999	1,624	−1.25%
2007	1,848	+1.63%
2012	1,889	+0.44%
2017	1,960	+0.74%
2023	2,056	+0.80%
Source: INSEE

== See also ==
- Communes of the Gironde department
