= Villemur-sur-Tarn =

- Commune
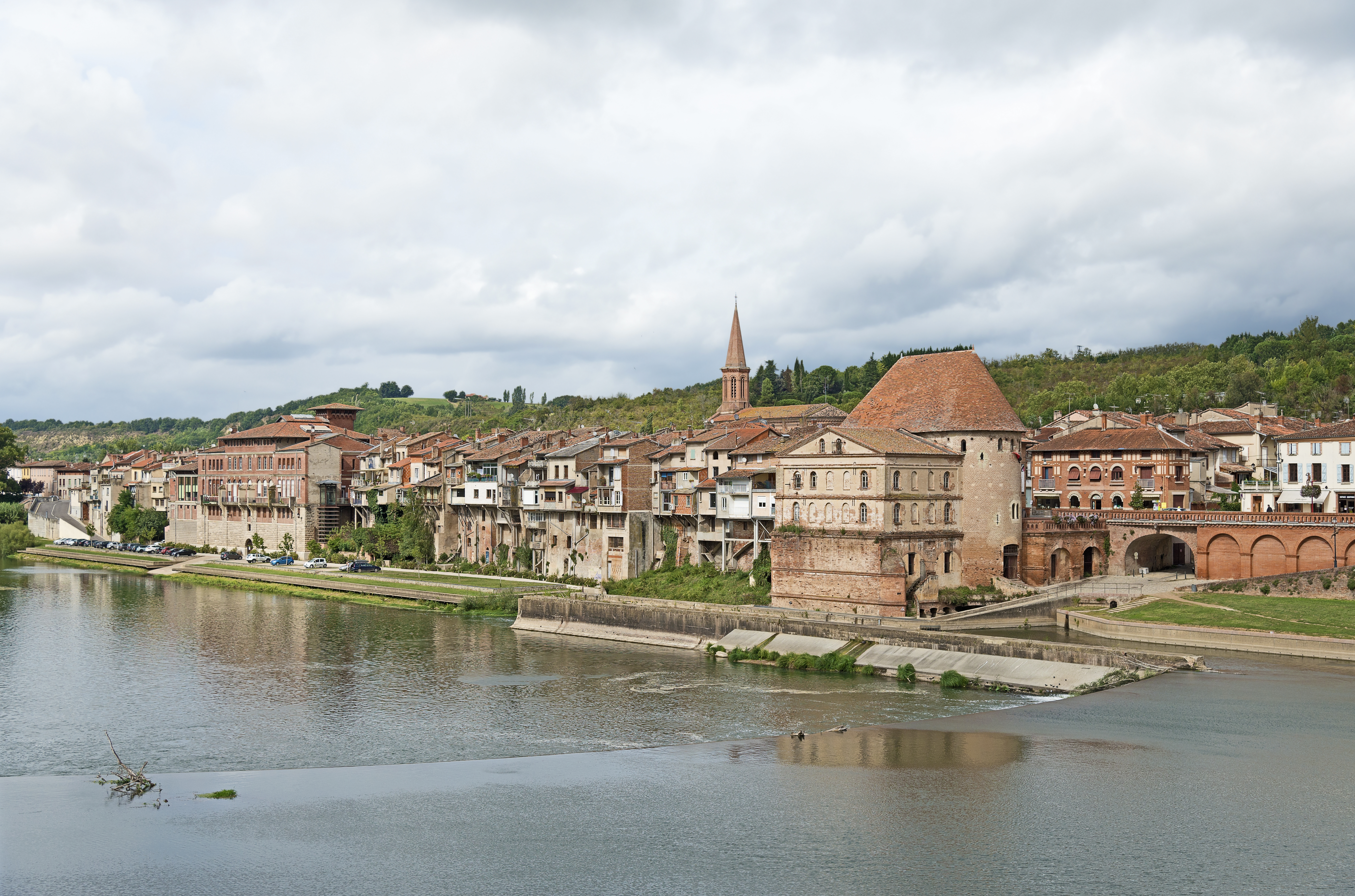
- A general view of Villemur-sur-Tarn

- Coat of arms
- Location of Villemur-sur-Tarn
- Location within France Location within Occitanie
- Coordinates: 43°51′59″N 1°30′21″E
- Country: France
- Region: Occitania
- Department: Haute-Garonne
- Arrondissement: Toulouse
- Canton: Villemur-sur-Tarn
- Intercommunality: Val'Aïgo

Government
  - Mayor (2020–2026): Jean-Marc Dumoulin
- Area^{1}: 46.57 km^{2} (17.98 sq mi)
- Elevation: 98 m (322 ft)
- Highest elevation: 218 m (715 ft)
- Lowest elevation: 85 m (279 ft)
- Population (2023): 6,345
  - Density: 136.2/km^{2} (352.9/sq mi)
- Time zone: UTC+01:00 (CET)
  - Summer (DST): UTC+02:00 (CEST)
- INSEE/Postal code: 31584 /31340
- ^{1} French Land Register data, which excludes lakes, ponds, glaciers > 1 km^{2} (0.386 sq mi or 247 acres) and river estuaries.

Villemur-sur-Tarn (French pronunciation: [vilmyʁ syʁ taʁn], literally Villemur on Tarn; Languedocien: Vilamur de Tarn) is a commune in the Haute-Garonne department in southwestern France.

== Population ==
Historical population

Year	Pop.	±% p.a.
1793	4,320	—
1800	5,488	+3.48%
1806	5,587	+0.30%
1821	5,627	+0.05%
1831	6,063	+0.75%
1836	5,565	−1.70%
1841	5,472	−0.34%
1846	5,472	+0.00%
1851	5,314	−0.58%
1856	5,323	+0.03%
1861	5,304	−0.07%
1866	4,768	−2.11%
1872	4,489	−1.00%
1876	4,530	+0.23%
1881	4,055	−2.19%
1886	4,080	+0.12%
1891	3,929	−0.75%
1896	3,944	+0.08%
1901	3,951	+0.04%

Year	Pop.	±% p.a.
1906	3,909	−0.21%
1911	3,255	−3.60%
1921	2,891	−1.18%
1926	3,008	+0.80%
1931	2,907	−0.68%
1936	3,038	+0.89%
1946	3,595	+1.70%
1954	3,691	+0.33%
1962	4,169	+1.53%
1968	4,738	+2.16%
1975	4,692	−0.14%
1982	4,415	−0.87%
1990	4,840	+1.16%
1999	4,929	+0.20%
2007	5,116	+0.47%
2012	5,712	+2.23%
2017	5,888	+0.61%
2023	6,345	+1.25%

Source: EHESS and INSEE (1968-2023)

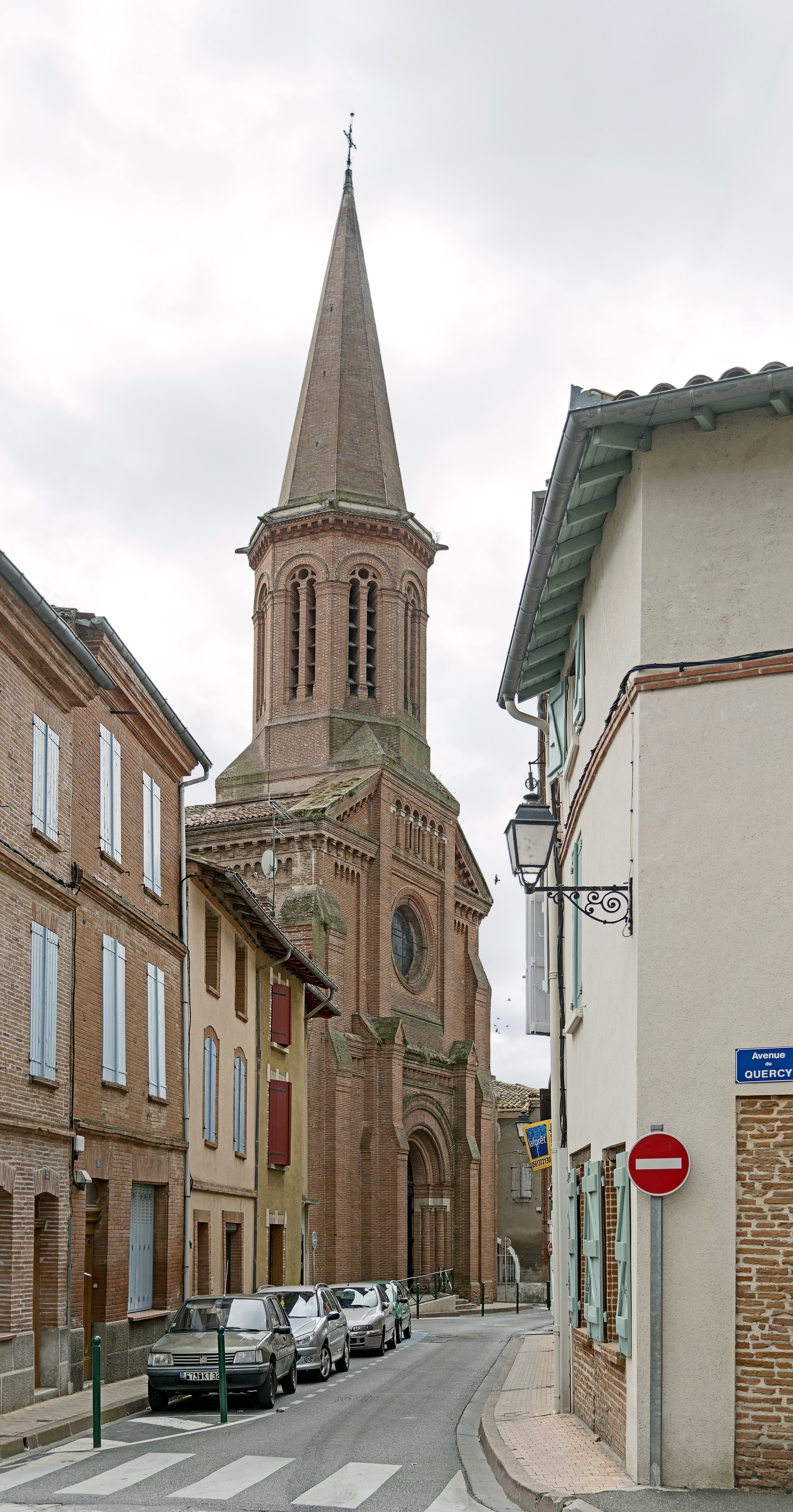
St. Michael's Church. Facade and bell tower

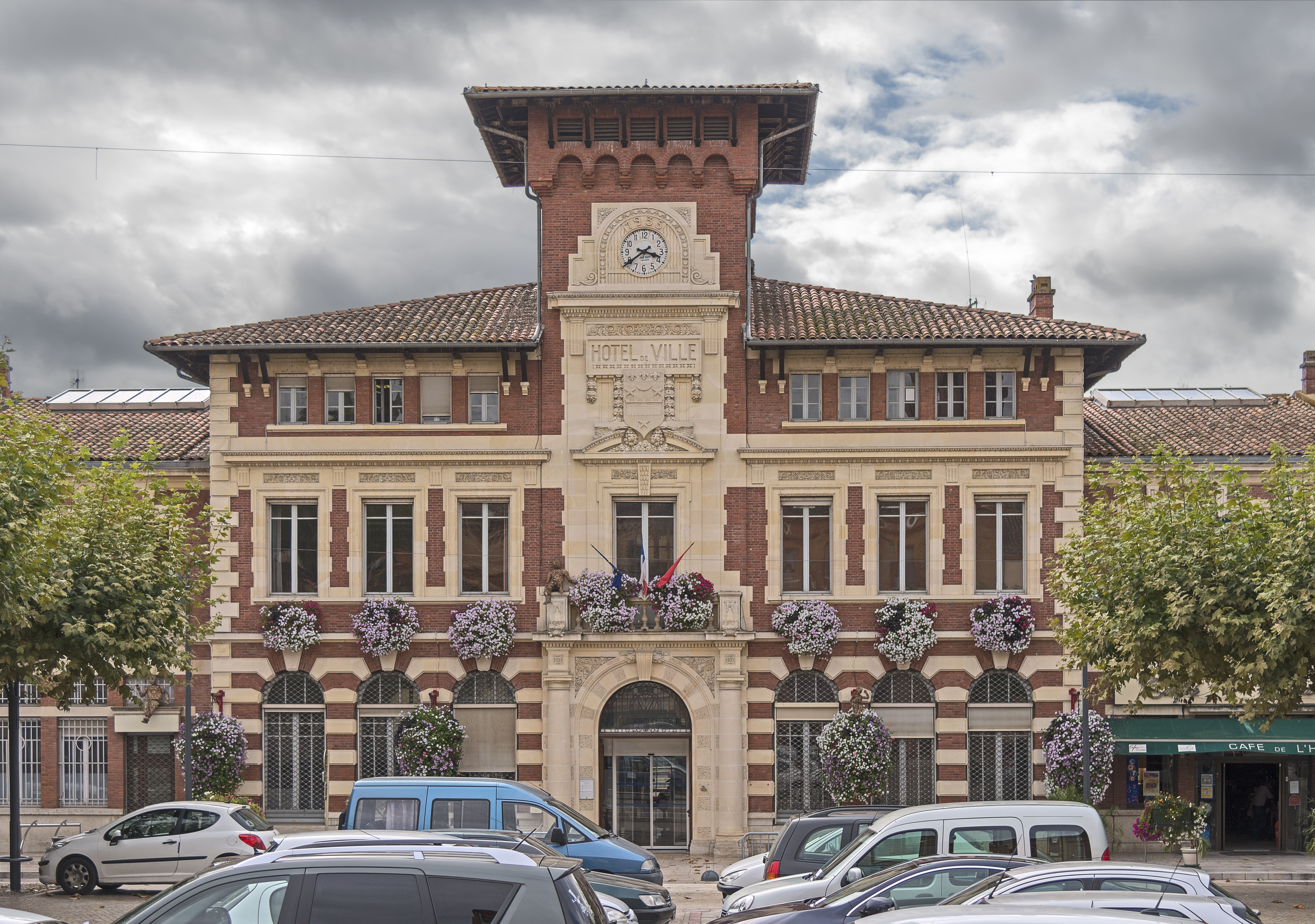
The Town Hall

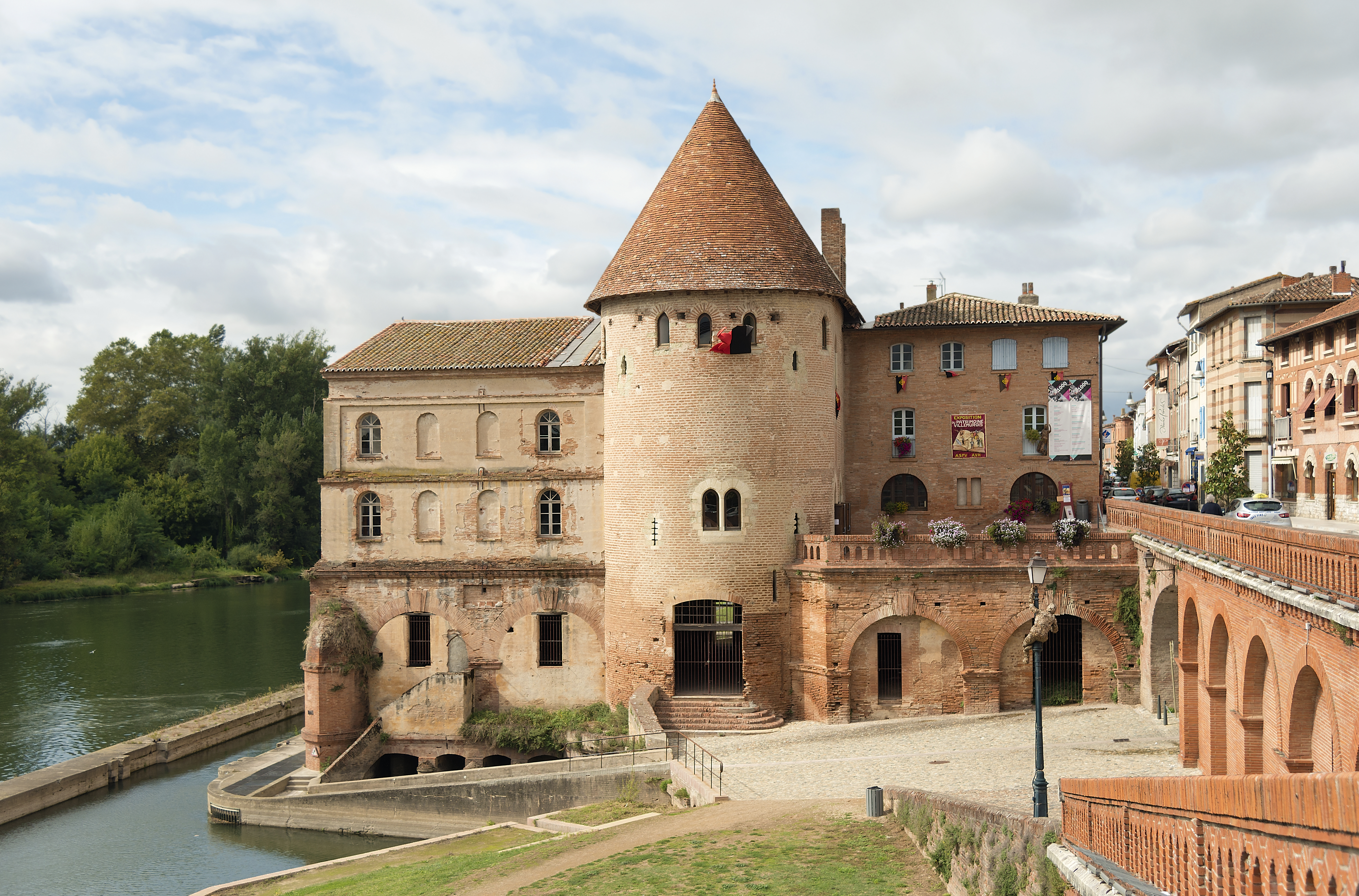
Tower defense, thirteenth century

== See also ==
- Communes of the Haute-Garonne department
