= Léojac =

- Commune
- Coat of arms
- Location of Léojac
- Location within France Location within Occitanie
- Coordinates: 44°00′13″N 1°26′52″E
- Country: France
- Region: Occitania
- Department: Tarn-et-Garonne
- Arrondissement: Montauban
- Canton: Tarn-Tescou-Quercy vert
- Intercommunality: CA Grand Montauban

Government
  - Mayor (2020–2026): Christian Quatre
- Area^{1}: 12.8 km^{2} (4.9 sq mi)
- Elevation: 206 m (676 ft)
- Highest elevation: 221 m (725 ft)
- Lowest elevation: 107 m (351 ft)
- Population (2023): 1,282
  - Density: 100/km^{2} (259/sq mi)
- Time zone: UTC+01:00 (CET)
  - Summer (DST): UTC+02:00 (CEST)
- INSEE/Postal code: 82098 /82230
- ^{1} French Land Register data, which excludes lakes, ponds, glaciers > 1 km^{2} (0.386 sq mi or 247 acres) and river estuaries.

Léojac (French pronunciation: [leɔʒak]; Languedocien: Leujac) is a commune in the Tarn-et-Garonne department in the Occitanie region in southern France.

== See also ==
- Communes of the Tarn-et-Garonne department
