= Saint-Germain-du-Puch =

- Commune
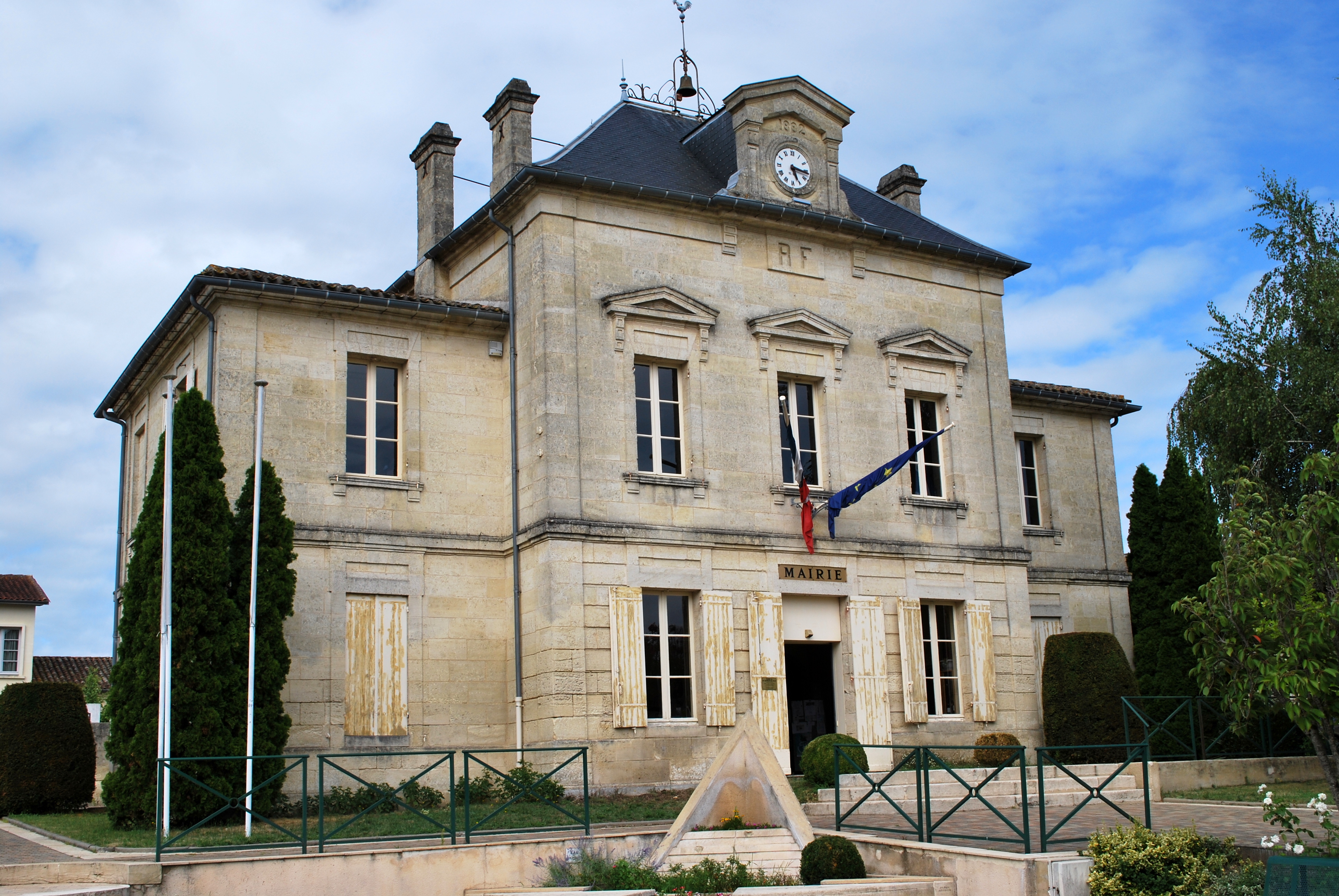
- The town hall in Saint-Germain-du-Puch

- Coat of arms
- Location of Saint-Germain-du-Puch
- Location within France Location within Nouvelle-Aquitaine
- Coordinates: 44°51′25″N 0°19′13″W
- Country: France
- Region: Nouvelle-Aquitaine
- Department: Gironde
- Arrondissement: Libourne
- Canton: Les Coteaux de Dordogne
- Intercommunality: CA Libournais

Government
  - Mayor (2020–2026): François Tosi
- Area^{1}: 11.76 km^{2} (4.54 sq mi)
- Elevation: 60 m (200 ft)
- Highest elevation: 71 m (233 ft)
- Lowest elevation: 11 m (36 ft)
- Population (2023): 2,304
  - Density: 195.9/km^{2} (507.4/sq mi)
- Time zone: UTC+01:00 (CET)
  - Summer (DST): UTC+02:00 (CEST)
- INSEE/Postal code: 33413 /33750
- ^{1} French Land Register data, which excludes lakes, ponds, glaciers > 1 km^{2} (0.386 sq mi or 247 acres) and river estuaries.

Saint-Germain-du-Puch (Occitan: Sant German del Puch) is a commune in the Gironde department in Nouvelle-Aquitaine in southwestern France.

== Population ==
Historical population
Year	Pop.	±% p.a.
1968	1,281	—
1975	1,395	+1.23%
1982	1,615	+2.11%
1990	1,813	+1.46%
1999	1,982	+1.00%
2007	2,025	+0.27%
2012	2,165	+1.35%
2017	2,156	−0.08%
2023	2,304	+1.11%
Source: INSEE

== See also ==
- Communes of the Gironde department
