= Bersac-sur-Rivalier =

- Commune
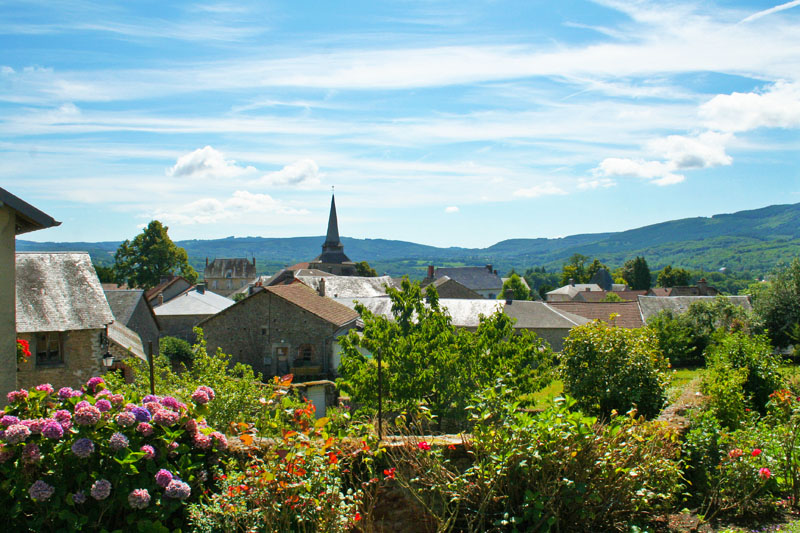
- A view of the village, and the Ambazac mountains

- Coat of arms
- Location of Bersac-sur-Rivalier
- Location within France Location within Nouvelle-Aquitaine
- Coordinates: 46°04′53″N 1°25′39″E
- Country: France
- Region: Nouvelle-Aquitaine
- Department: Haute-Vienne
- Arrondissement: Limoges
- Canton: Ambazac

Government
  - Mayor (2020–2026): Jean-Michel Bertrand
- Area^{1}: 32.54 km^{2} (12.56 sq mi)
- Highest elevation: 612 m (2,008 ft)
- Lowest elevation: 285 m (935 ft)
- Population (2023): 610
  - Density: 19/km^{2} (49/sq mi)
- Time zone: UTC+01:00 (CET)
  - Summer (DST): UTC+02:00 (CEST)
- INSEE/Postal code: 87013 /87370
- ^{1} French Land Register data, which excludes lakes, ponds, glaciers > 1 km^{2} (0.386 sq mi or 247 acres) and river estuaries.

Bersac-sur-Rivalier (French pronunciation: [bɛʁsak syʁ ʁivalje]; Occitan: Barçac) is a commune in the Haute-Vienne department in the Nouvelle-Aquitaine region in western France.

Inhabitants are known as Bersacois in French.

== See also ==
- Communes of the Haute-Vienne department
