= Combronde =

- Commune
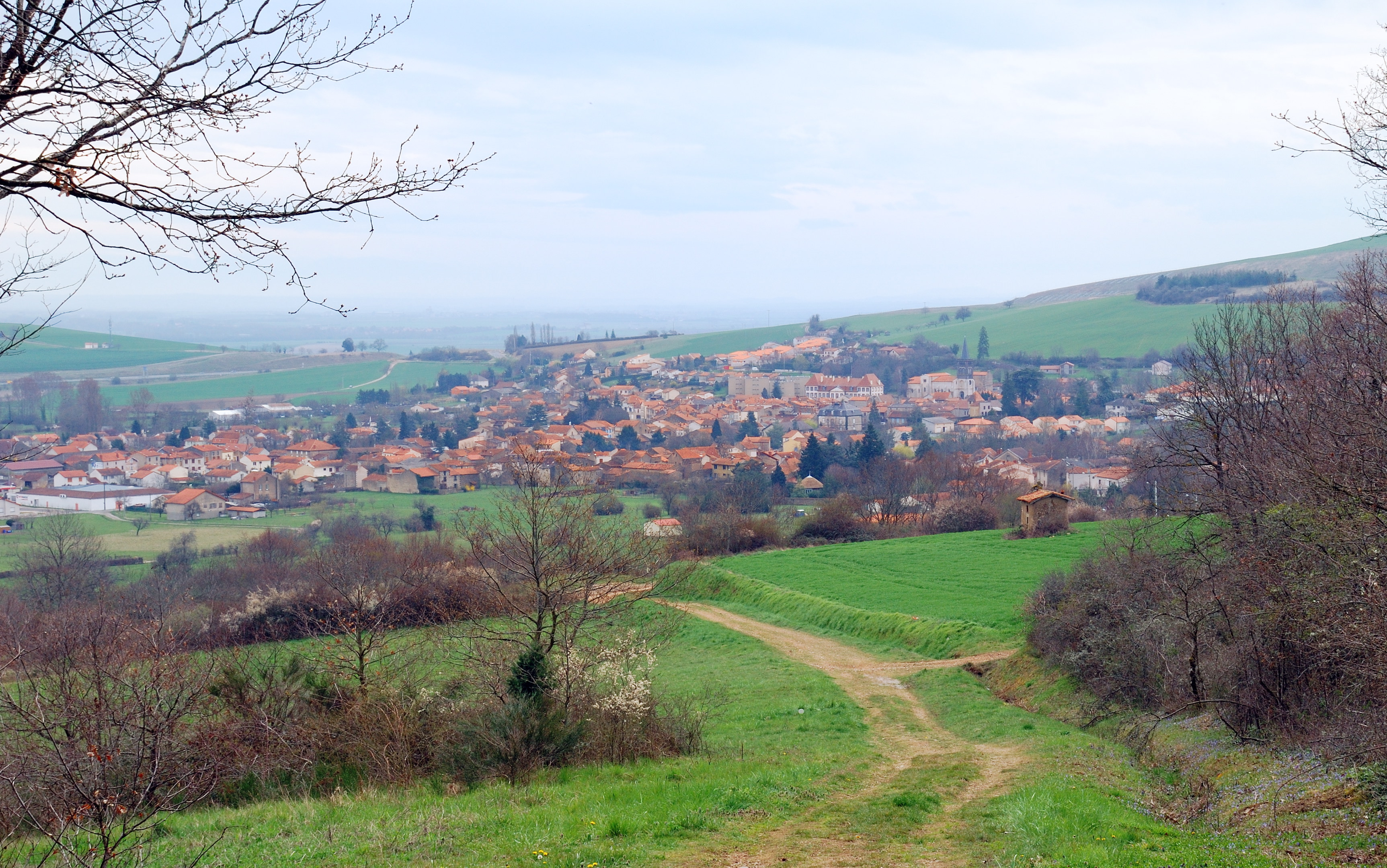
- A general view of Combronde

- Coat of arms
- Location of Combronde
- Location within France Location within Auvergne-Rhône-Alpes
- Coordinates: 45°58′55″N 3°05′20″E
- Country: France
- Region: Auvergne-Rhône-Alpes
- Department: Puy-de-Dôme
- Arrondissement: Riom
- Canton: Saint-Georges-de-Mons
- Intercommunality: CC Combrailles Sioule et Morge

Government
  - Mayor (2020–2026): Alain Espagnol
- Area^{1}: 18 km^{2} (6.9 sq mi)
- Elevation: 392 m (1,286 ft)
- Highest elevation: 701 m (2,300 ft)
- Lowest elevation: 356 m (1,168 ft)
- Population (2023): 2,138
  - Density: 120/km^{2} (310/sq mi)
- Time zone: UTC+01:00 (CET)
  - Summer (DST): UTC+02:00 (CEST)
- INSEE/Postal code: 63116 /63460
- ^{1} French Land Register data, which excludes lakes, ponds, glaciers > 1 km^{2} (0.386 sq mi or 247 acres) and river estuaries.

Combronde (French pronunciation: [kɔ̃bʁɔ̃d]; Occitan: Combaronda) is a commune in the Puy-de-Dôme department in Auvergne-Rhône-Alpes in central France.

== Population ==
Historical population
Year	Pop.	±% p.a.
1968	1,950	—
1975	1,949	−0.01%
1982	1,975	+0.19%
1990	1,843	−0.86%
1999	1,868	+0.15%
2007	1,940	+0.47%
2012	2,060	+1.21%
2017	2,206	+1.38%
2023	2,138	−0.52%
Source: INSEE

== See also ==
- Communes of the Puy-de-Dôme department
