= Balbigny =

- Commune
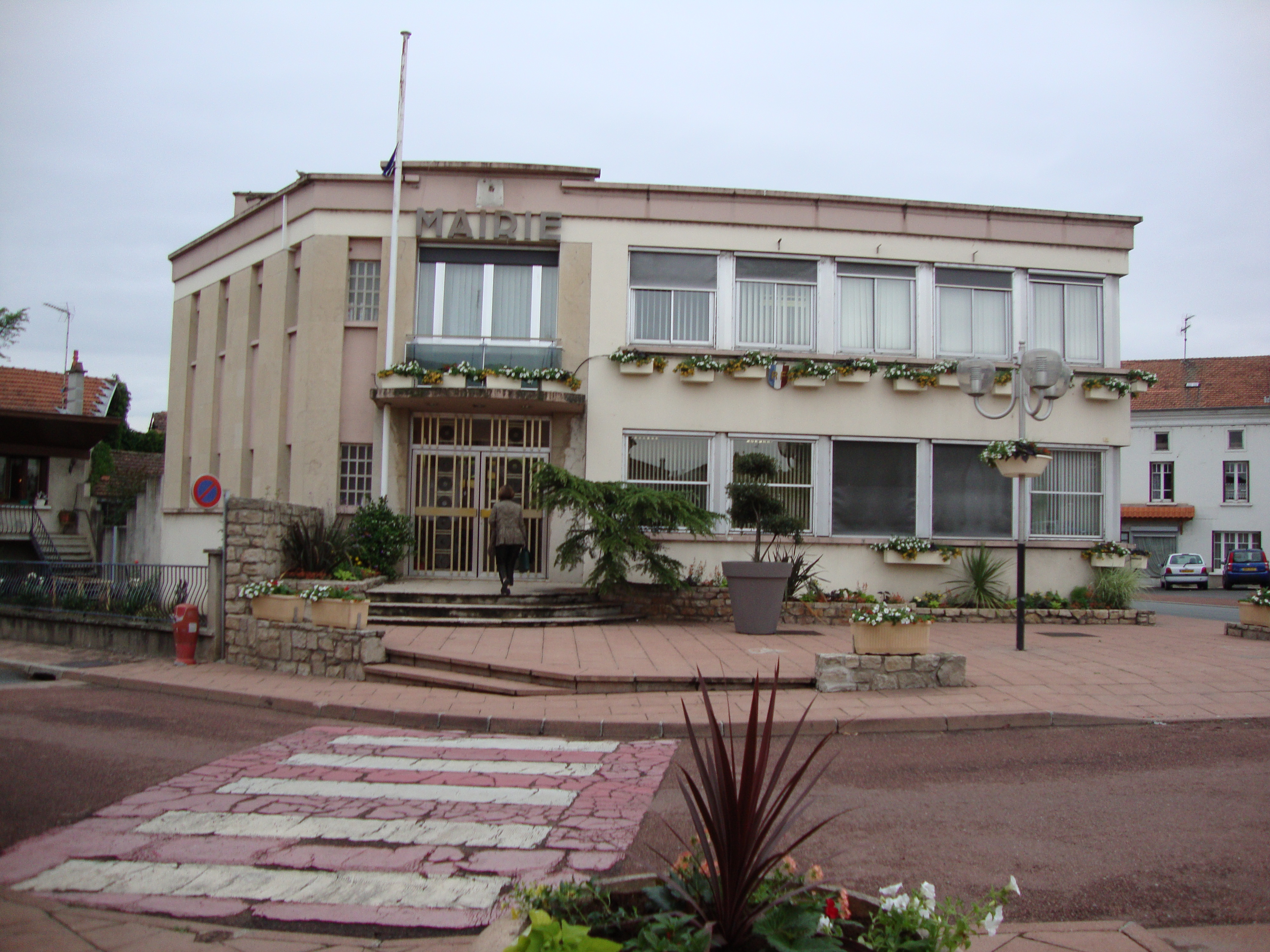
- Town hall
- Location of Balbigny
- Location within France Location within Auvergne-Rhône-Alpes
- Coordinates: 45°49′09″N 4°11′17″E
- Country: France
- Region: Auvergne-Rhône-Alpes
- Department: Loire
- Arrondissement: Roanne
- Canton: Le Coteau

Government
  - Mayor (2020–2026): Gilles Dupin
- Area^{1}: 16.98 km^{2} (6.56 sq mi)
- Highest elevation: 482 m (1,581 ft)
- Lowest elevation: 314 m (1,030 ft)
- Population (2023): 2,911
  - Density: 171.4/km^{2} (444.0/sq mi)
- Time zone: UTC+01:00 (CET)
  - Summer (DST): UTC+02:00 (CEST)
- INSEE/Postal code: 42011 /42510
- ^{1} French Land Register data, which excludes lakes, ponds, glaciers > 1 km^{2} (0.386 sq mi or 247 acres) and river estuaries.

Balbigny (French pronunciation: [balbiɲi]) is a commune in the Loire department in central France.

== History ==
Balbigny owes its name to a Roman general named Balbinius who based himself here in order to conduct a war. Nothing survives from this period. The earliest identified traces of Balbigny date from 1090.

During the eighteenth and nineteenth centuries, before the Loire was channelled, Balbigny was a village of boatmen, known for flat bottomed boats known as Rambertes which were used to transport the coal mined at Saint-Étienne. The loaded Rambertes arrived from Saint-Rambert and stopped off at Balbigny where the boat crews were changed, taking the boats to the next change-over point at Roanne. All this changed in August 1832 with the arrival of the third oldest railway line in France which connected Andrézieux-Bouthéon with Roanne, passing Balbigny en route. An extension of the rail network in 1913 saw Balbigny connected with Saint-Germain-Laval and Régny. The coal was therefore transported by rail, but the railway also gave farmers in the district access to a wider range of markets for their produce.

The road bridge crossing the Loire was destroyed in 1940 in order to hold back advancing German troops, and a ferry service was introduced to permit the river to be crossed. The bridge was rebuilt in 1950.

== Population ==
Historical population
Year	Pop.	±% p.a.
1968	2,023	—
1975	2,314	+1.94%
1982	2,469	+0.93%
1990	2,415	−0.28%
1999	2,616	+0.89%
2007	2,634	+0.09%
2012	2,897	+1.92%
2017	2,965	+0.47%
2023	2,911	−0.31%
Source: INSEE

== Twin towns ==
Balbigny is twinned with:

- Chaumont, Haute-Marne, France

== See also ==
- Communes of the Loire department
