= Saint-Germain-les-Vergnes =

- Commune
- Coat of arms
- Location of Saint-Germain-les-Vergnes
- Location within France Location within Nouvelle-Aquitaine
- Coordinates: 45°16′29″N 1°38′09″E
- Country: France
- Region: Nouvelle-Aquitaine
- Department: Corrèze
- Arrondissement: Tulle
- Canton: Naves
- Intercommunality: CA Tulle Agglo

Government
  - Mayor (2020–2026): Alain Penot
- Area^{1}: 19.15 km^{2} (7.39 sq mi)
- Elevation: 320 m (1,050 ft)
- Highest elevation: 464 m (1,522 ft)
- Lowest elevation: 284 m (932 ft)
- Population (2023): 1,153
  - Density: 60.21/km^{2} (155.9/sq mi)
- Time zone: UTC+01:00 (CET)
  - Summer (DST): UTC+02:00 (CEST)
- INSEE/Postal code: 19207 /19330
- ^{1} French Land Register data, which excludes lakes, ponds, glaciers > 1 km^{2} (0.386 sq mi or 247 acres) and river estuaries.

Saint-Germain-les-Vergnes (French pronunciation: [sɛ̃ ʒɛʁmɛ̃ le vɛʁɲ]; Occitan: Sent German las Vernhas) is a commune in the Corrèze department in central France.

== Population ==
Historical population
| Year | Pop. | ±% p.a. |
|---|---|---|
| 1968 | 804 | — |
| 1975 | 818 | +0.25% |
| 1982 | 854 | +0.62% |
| 1990 | 914 | +0.85% |
| 1999 | 844 | −0.88% |
| 2007 | 924 | +1.14% |
| 2012 | 1,028 | +2.16% |
| 2017 | 1,114 | +1.62% |
| 2023 | 1,153 | +0.58% |
Source: INSEE

== See also ==
- Communes of the Corrèze department
