= A65 autoroute =

Road in France

A65 autoroute
- Autoroute de Gascogne

Route information
- Part of E7
- Maintained by A'LIENOR
- Length: 150 km (93 mi)
- Existed: 2010–present

Major junctions
- North end: E72 / A 62 in Langon

- South end: E7 / E80 / A 64 in Lescar

Location
- Country: France

Highway system
- Roads in France; Autoroutes; Routes nationales

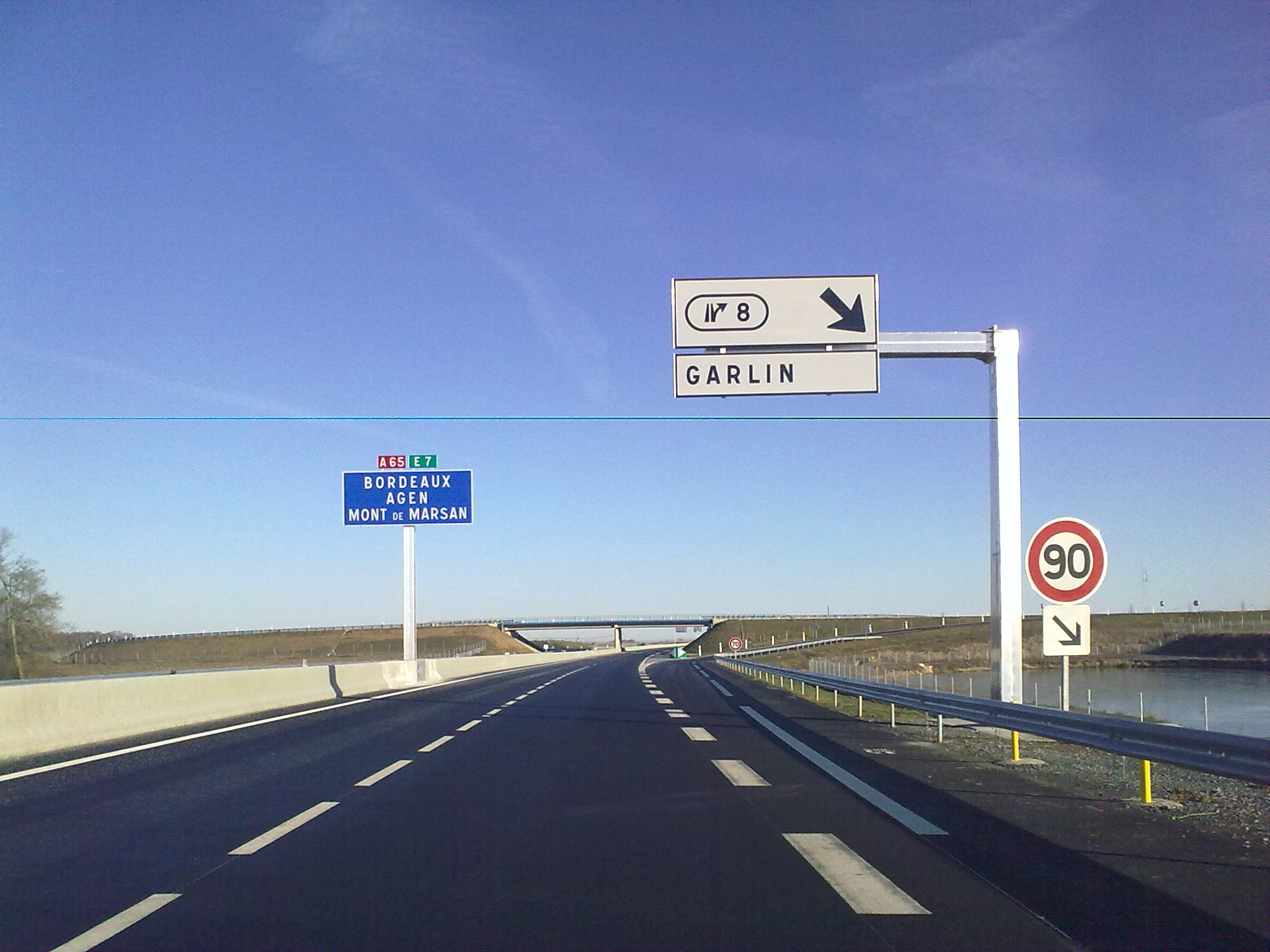
Motorway in 2010 December,19 at exit 9

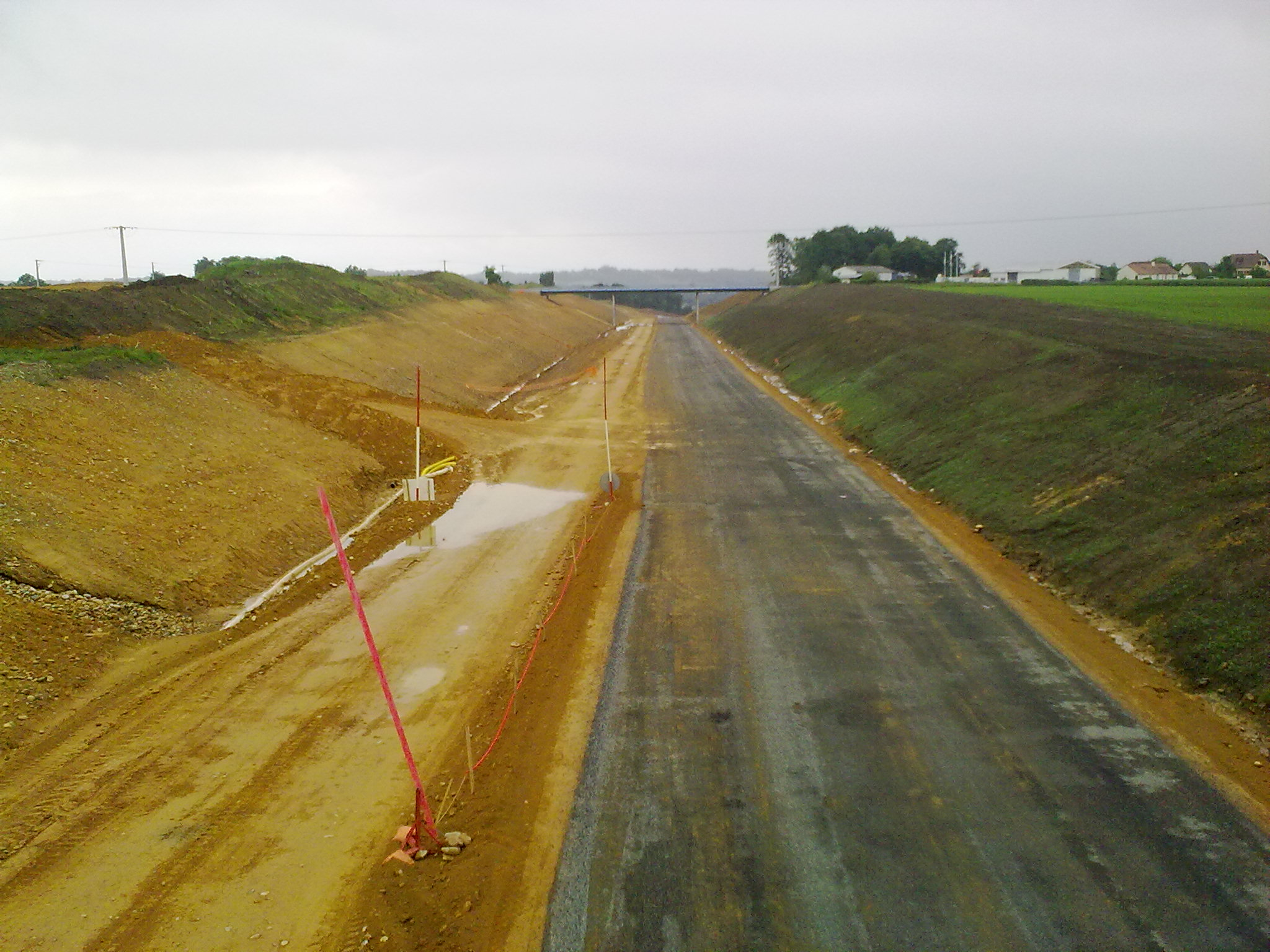
Construction in June 2010

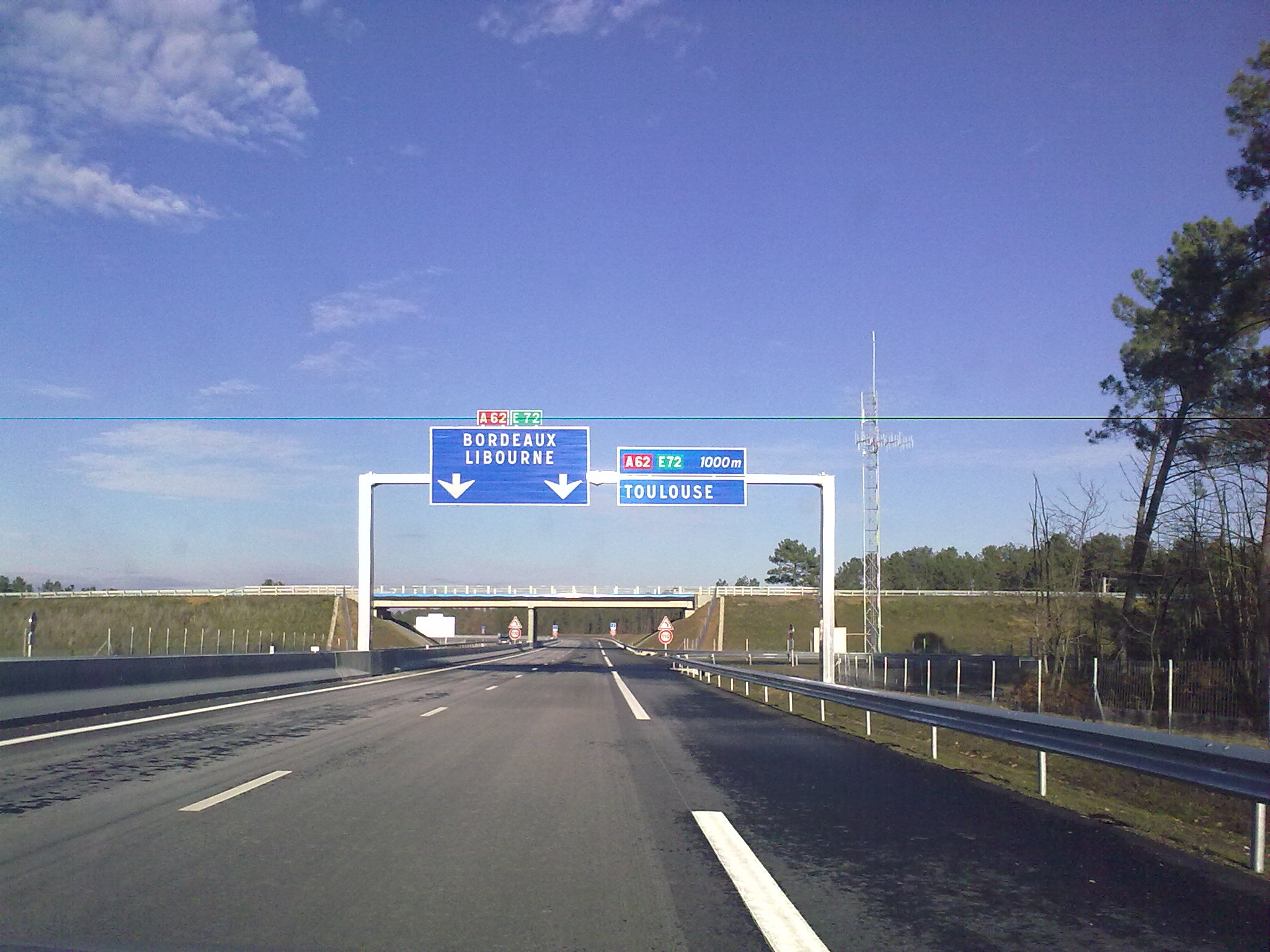
The A65 at Langon

The A65 autoroute is a motorway in south west France. Construction started in 2008 and it was officially opened on 14 December 2010. It connects Langon (Gironde) to Pau (Pyrénées-Atlantiques), with a toll payable of €19.70 for the complete journey by car.

Known also as Autoroute de Gascogne, its length is approximately 150 kilometres (93 mi). The construction project was initiated by CIACT, who announced the beginning of work in 2008. It was built by a joint venture A'LIENOR, 65% owned by Eiffage and 35% by SANEF, who will have effective control for 65 years.

The financing, construction and running of the motorway was borne by the private company with no public subsidy required. Funds of over one billion euros were needed from the shareholders and banks to finance the road.

== Schedule ==
- 2006-2007 Decree of declaration of public utility (DUP). Final negotiation of the contract with the State, which will be published after the publication of the decree. Detailed studies into the detail and preliminary procedures to complete the work: Investigations and Hydraulics (legal issues on water).
- 2008 land Acquisition and beginning of work
- Opened December 16, 2010.

== Layout ==
The road increases the speed of journeys from Bordeaux to Pau by automobile. It offers an alternative to the RN134 and RD932 and RD934 (Landes and the Gironde). The road starts in Langon, near Bordeaux, at a junction with A62, then crosses the Gironde and the Eastern part of the Landes where it integrates the By-pass round Aire-sur-l'Adour. Finally it heads through the northern Pyrénées-Atlantiques joining the A64 at Poey-de-Lescar, near Pau.

== Lists of Exits and junctions ==
Region	Department	Junctions	Destinations	Notes
Nouvelle-Aquitaine	Gironde	A62 - A65	Bordeaux, Libourne	
Nouvelle-Aquitaine	Gironde	A62 - A65	Agen, Toulouse	
Nouvelle-Aquitaine	Gironde	1 : Bazas	Bazas	
Nouvelle-Aquitaine	Gironde	1 : Bazas	Aire de Bazas	
Nouvelle-Aquitaine	Gironde	2 : Captieux	Casteljaloux, Captieux	
Nouvelle-Aquitaine	Gironde	2 : Captieux	Aire de Cœur d'Aquitaine	
Nouvelle-Aquitaine	Landes	3 : Roquefort	Roquefort, Labrit, Parc des Landes de Gascogne	
Nouvelle-Aquitaine	Landes	3 : Roquefort	Aire de la Porte d'Armagnac	
Nouvelle-Aquitaine	Landes	4 : Mont-de-Marsan	Barbotan-les-Thermes, Villeneuve-sur-Lot, Mont-de-Marsan, Dax, Bayonne	
Nouvelle-Aquitaine	Landes	4 : Mont-de-Marsan	Aire de repos de Marsan	
Nouvelle-Aquitaine	Landes	6 : Aire-sur-l'Adour - nord	Aire-sur-l'Adour, Marciac, Nogaro, Mont-de-Marsan, Tarbes, Auch, Agen, Bordeaux	
Nouvelle-Aquitaine	Landes	6 : Aire-sur-l'Adour - nord	Aire de l'Adour	
Nouvelle-Aquitaine	Landes	7 : Aire-sur-l'Adour - sud	Aire-sur-l'Adour, Hagetmau, Pau	Entry and exit only from Bordeaux
Nouvelle-Aquitaine	Pyrénées-Atlantiques	8 : Garlin	Garlin, Geaune	
Nouvelle-Aquitaine	Pyrénées-Atlantiques	9 : Thèze	Morlaàs, Thèze	
Nouvelle-Aquitaine	Pyrénées-Atlantiques	9 : Thèze	Aire de repos du Béarn Vert et Or	
Nouvelle-Aquitaine	Pyrénées-Atlantiques	A64 - A65	Bayonne, Dax, Saint-Sébastien	
Nouvelle-Aquitaine	Pyrénées-Atlantiques	A64 - A65	Pau, Tarbes, Toulouse, Lourdes, Saragosse	
1.000 mi = 1.609 km; 1.000 km = 0.621 mi

== Environmental impact ==
The road consumes 2000 ha of virgin countryside, in particular sections of France's largest forest, Les Landes. It was predicted to require 4 million tons of aggregates in its construction.

== Extension ==
The motorway was to be extended south, connecting Pau to Oloron-Sainte-Marie as the A650 but the project was abandoned in 2008. It would have started at the interchange with the A64 Bayonne - Toulouse autoroute at Poey-de-Lescar and would have run as far as the bypass of Oloron-Sainte-Marie. The ultimate aim would be to connect to the Somport Tunnel to Spain.
