= Michelle de Bonneuil =

French overseas agent

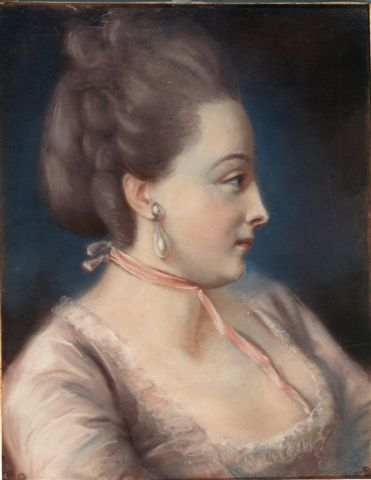
- Portrait of Michelle de Bonneuil by Rosalie Filleul
- Born: 7 March 1748; Sainte-Suzanne, Île Bourbon
- Died: 30 December 1829 (aged 81); Paris
- Occupation: Agent

Michelle Sentuary (7 March 1748, Sainte-Suzanne, île Bourbon – 30 December 1829, Paris), married name Jean-Cyrille Guesnon de Bonneuil, was a French overseas agent during the French Revolution and First French Empire. Inspiring André Chénier and others, she was a lady "celebrated for her beauty and her agreeable spirit" according to the formula of Charles de Lacretelle himself a friend of Chénier. She stands for thousands of women in modern and contemporary historiography, and has had several biographies in biographical dictionaries. She was the mother of Amédée Despans-Cubières.

== Life ==
=== Creole origins ===
Born in 1748 on Réunion, Michelle Sentuary was the younger daughter of Jean Sentuary and of Marie-Catherine Caillou. She was educated at Sainte-Suzanne, where her father had a plantation, and at Bordeaux, where in 1768 she married Jean-Cyrille Guesnon de Bonneuil, who had a post in the household of the comtesse d’Artois.

=== Paris society ===
She then came to Paris where her beauty, charm, conversation and talents in singing and painting (Hubert Robert gave her painting lessons in the Sainte-Pélagie Prison and she exhibited her floral still lifes at the 1795 Salon) made herself famous in artistocratic and intellectual circles. Élisabeth Vigée Le Brun, her painting-tutor and friend, called her "the most beautiful lady in Paris", and she had her portrait produced by the pastellist Rosalie Filleul, the painter Alexander Roslin (who portrayed her in "African" costume), the sculptor Jean-Baptiste Lemoyne and many other artists.

A friend of poets, she belonged to the anacreontic circle at Marly known as "la Caserne", a strong institution freely inspired by Freemasonry. Its main hosts were three knight-poets - Évariste de Parny (author of erotic poetry), Antoine Bertin (who celebrated his sister Marie-Catherine under the name Eucharis) and Michel de Cubières. To finance new bribery within the princely household by her husband, Michelle de Bonneuil joined her sisters Marie-Catherine and Augustine-Françoise, Mmme Thilorier - the future Mme Jean-Jacques Duval d'Eprémesnil - as mistress to the rich financier Nicolas Beaujon, residing for some time at the hôtel d'Évreux. It was without doubt during this era of extreme dissipation that she met the Swiss banker Jean-Frédéric Perrégaux who she returned to at intervals until some time during the First Empire On his death, Nicolas Beaujon left her 100,000 livres that he had advanced her during his life. According to the painter John Trumbull on a trip to Paris, she moved in the highest spheres of French society and had come to be known as "comtesse de Bonneuil" - he wrote "de Bonouil" and was one of the most splendid ladies that he had never met.

A friend of Anne de Caumont-Laforce, comtesse de Balbi, who she courted at the Luxembourg Palace where her husband (elder than her) had become first valet to the count of Provence. Mme de Bonneuil there took admiral John Paul Jones as a temporary lover and a lasting liaison with the comte de Vaudreuil, as well as other liaisons with the baron de Bruny de La Tour d'Aygues (who dedicated to her an engraving of a flute-playing satyr), the scholar marquis de Cubières (landowner of the Ermitage on the rue de Maurepas at Versailles, with whom she had a son, Amédée-Louis Despans (taking the name Cubières from 1803 on his adoption by his natural father), comte Charles de Sartines (son of the minister, he offered her a carriage bearing her own arms for a tour of Longchamp - the shield was formed from an open eye surmounted by a count's crown, placed above a cornucopia, surrounded by foxes, of which one was apparently "éventré" -, the comte de Caylus (who pretended to initiate her into illuminism). She later met the abbot Augustin Barruel who made her "one of the ladies whom the searching sophists make their adepts, their females apostles". Abbot Raynal especially sought to insinuate that her daily dinners promoted atheism - their attendees replied "No, there is no God and it has to be said, and, as you repeat to others, in conversations, in circles, the truth must be known and become common". A free and adventurous spirit, Mme de Bonneuil was also initiated into the mysteries of Cagliostro and the rites of Egyptian Freemasonry, of which her brother-in-law Jean-Jacques Duval d'Eprémesnil was one of the masters. Her sister's two husbands - Jacques Thilorier and Jean-Jacques Duval d'Eprémesnil -both belonged to the Loge des Neuf Sœurs, and it is very possible that Mme de Bonneuil was herself initiated into one of the Loges d'adoption féminine, before turning her back on the new ideas and the principals of philosophy which - after the Reign of Terror - she sincerely thought had led to the "reign of the Jacobins". In dispatches she wrote from Spain, she alluded to the Jacobins, who she held responsible for the horrors of the Terror, having not only narrowly escaped the guillotine herself but also lost her sister, brother-in-law and many of her friends (including the poet André Chénier who celebrated her in his Élégies under the names Camille (anagram of "Micaëlle" or Michelle) or "d.z.n" (of "Sentuary d’Azan") to it.

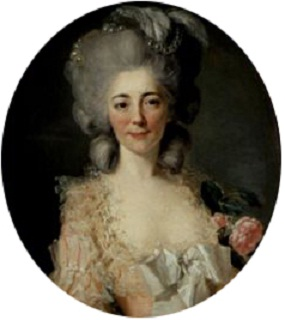

=== French Revolution ===
On the arrival of the Revolution, Mme de Bonneuil shared ultra-conservative views with Jacques Antoine Marie de Cazalès, her latest lover, and of Jean-Jacques Duval d'Eprémesnil, noble députés who sat with abbot Jean-Sifrein Maury on the extreme right of the semicircle of seats at the Constituent assembly. From 1791, she was implicated in counter-revolutionary projects, of which few were as badly executed as the royal family's planned escape with others from the hôtel d'Esclignac, which ended in the plotters' arrest on 18 April 1791. She was linked in friendship with the most famous of the counter-revolutionaries, such as Louis-Alexandre de Launay comte d’Antraigues who she pretended to take to Le Scioto, in the United States, with "only one of her hair".

=== Her role in the Jean-Charles Pichegru affair ===
In spring 1802, profiting from the treaty of Amiens and the opening of England to French men and women (closed to them since 1797), Mme de Bonneuil left for London where the new French ambassador Otto saw her passport in July 1802. In September she reached Edinburgh, where she was received in a private audience by the hard-to-meet comte d'Artois, maybe in the presence of his confident the comte de Vaudreuil.

== Bibliography ==
- (in French) Olivier Blanc, Madame de Bonneuil, femme galante et agent secret (1748–1829), preface by Jacques Godechot, Paris, Robert Laffont, 1987.
- (in French) Olivier Blanc, Les Espions de la Révolution et de l’Empire, Paris, Perrin, 1995.
- (in French) Olivier Blanc, Regnaud de Saint-Jean d'Angély, éminence grise de Napoléon, Paris, 2003.
