= Françoise-Augustine Duval d'Eprémesnil =

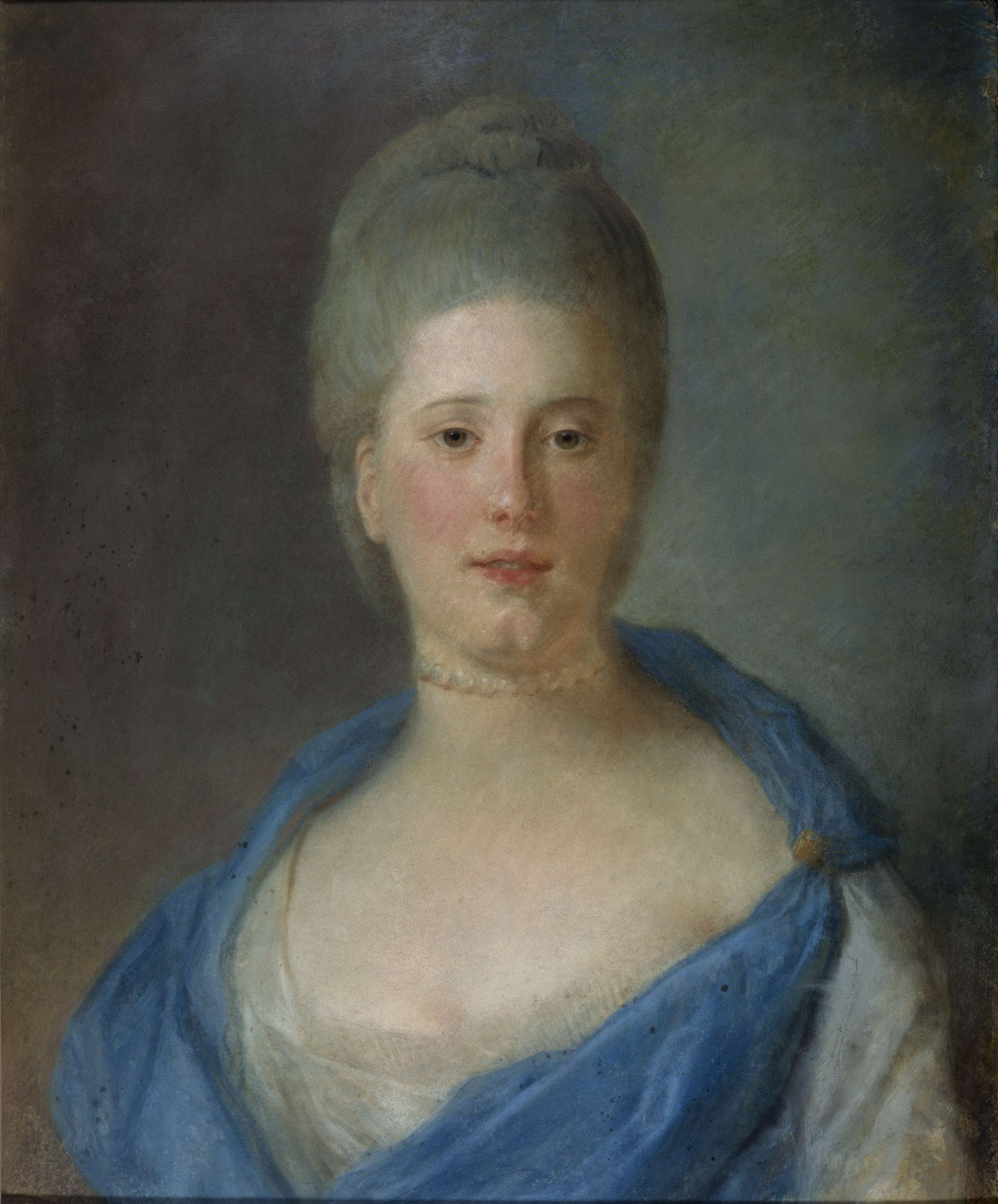
Portrait by Jean-Baptiste Perronneau, 1778

Françoise-Augustine Sentuary (31 March 1749, in Saint-Denis, Île Bourbon – 17 June 1794, in Paris) was a French salonniére. She was a notable counter-revolutionary during the French Revolution. She was executed in Paris as an accomplice of Jean, Baron de Batz. She was the daughter of Jean Sentuary and sister to Michelle de Bonneuil.

== Bibliography ==
- Françoise-Augustine Sentuary, Mme Duval d’Eprémesnil, Lettre de Mme d’Éprémesnil au principal ministre pour se disculper d’avoir tenu des propos séditieux, Paris (1788)
- Olivier Blanc, Les Libertines. Plaisir et liberté au temps des Lumières, Paris, Perrin, 1997, pages 89–104.
