= Bernos-Beaulac =

- Commune
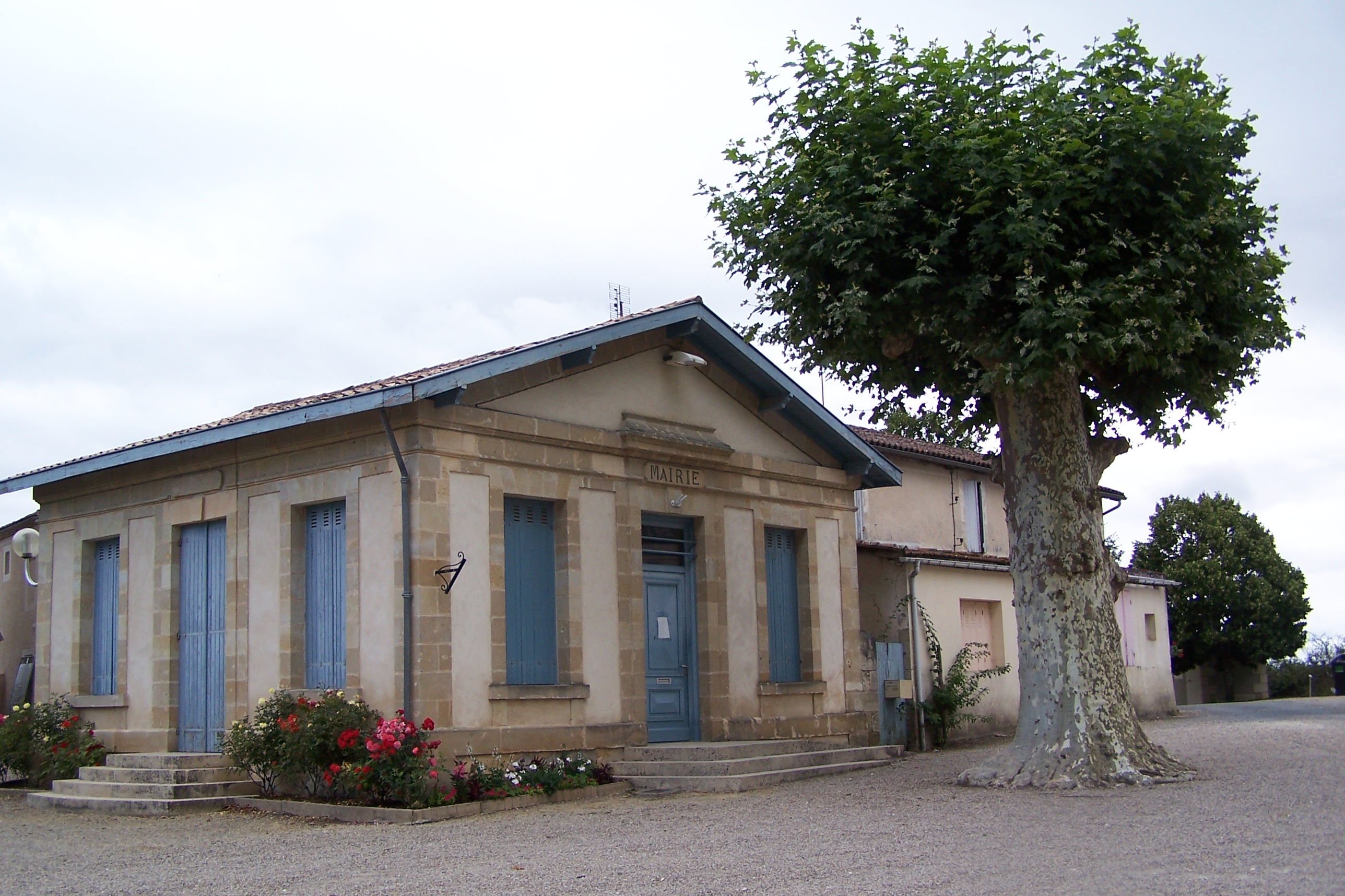
- The town hall in Bernos-Beaulac
- Location of Bernos-Beaulac
- Location within France Location within Nouvelle-Aquitaine
- Coordinates: 44°22′52″N 0°15′25″W
- Country: France
- Region: Nouvelle-Aquitaine
- Department: Gironde
- Arrondissement: Langon
- Canton: Le Sud-Gironde
- Intercommunality: Bazadais

Government
  - Mayor (2020–2026): Jacqueline Lartigue Renouil
- Area^{1}: 36.8 km^{2} (14.2 sq mi)
- Highest elevation: 122 m (400 ft)
- Lowest elevation: 46 m (151 ft)
- Population (2023): 1,131
  - Density: 30.7/km^{2} (79.6/sq mi)
- Time zone: UTC+01:00 (CET)
  - Summer (DST): UTC+02:00 (CEST)
- INSEE/Postal code: 33046 /33430
- ^{1} French Land Register data, which excludes lakes, ponds, glaciers > 1 km^{2} (0.386 sq mi or 247 acres) and river estuaries.

Bernos-Beaulac (French pronunciation: [bɛʁnɔs bolak]; Gascon: Bernòs e Baulac) is a commune in the Gironde department in Nouvelle-Aquitaine in southwestern France.

The principal settlement in the commune is the village of Beaulac, situated where the route nationale 524 crosses the Ciron river.

The RN 524 forms part of the Itinéraire à Grand Gabarit, a route which has been modified to allow its use by the oversize road convoys conveying body sections and wings of the Airbus A380 airliner. Major works were required to permit this, including widening of the bridge over the Ciron, reconstructed junctions and the rebuilding of 500 metres (1,600 ft) of road through Beaulac with new pedestrian paths, central islands and lighting.

== Population ==
Historical population
Year	Pop.	±% p.a.
1968	1,050	—
1975	1,023	−0.37%
1982	939	−1.22%
1990	1,020	+1.04%
1999	1,071	+0.54%
2007	1,075	+0.05%
2012	1,171	+1.73%
2017	1,104	−1.17%
2023	1,131	+0.40%
Source: INSEE

== Personalities ==
- Mitt Romney was injured in a car accident June 16, 1968 in Bernos-Beaulac, when he was a Mormon missionary in France. He had a broken arm, but was mistakenly declared dead at the scene of the accident.

== See also ==
- Communes of the Gironde department
