= Langon, Gironde =

Langon
- Subprefecture and commune
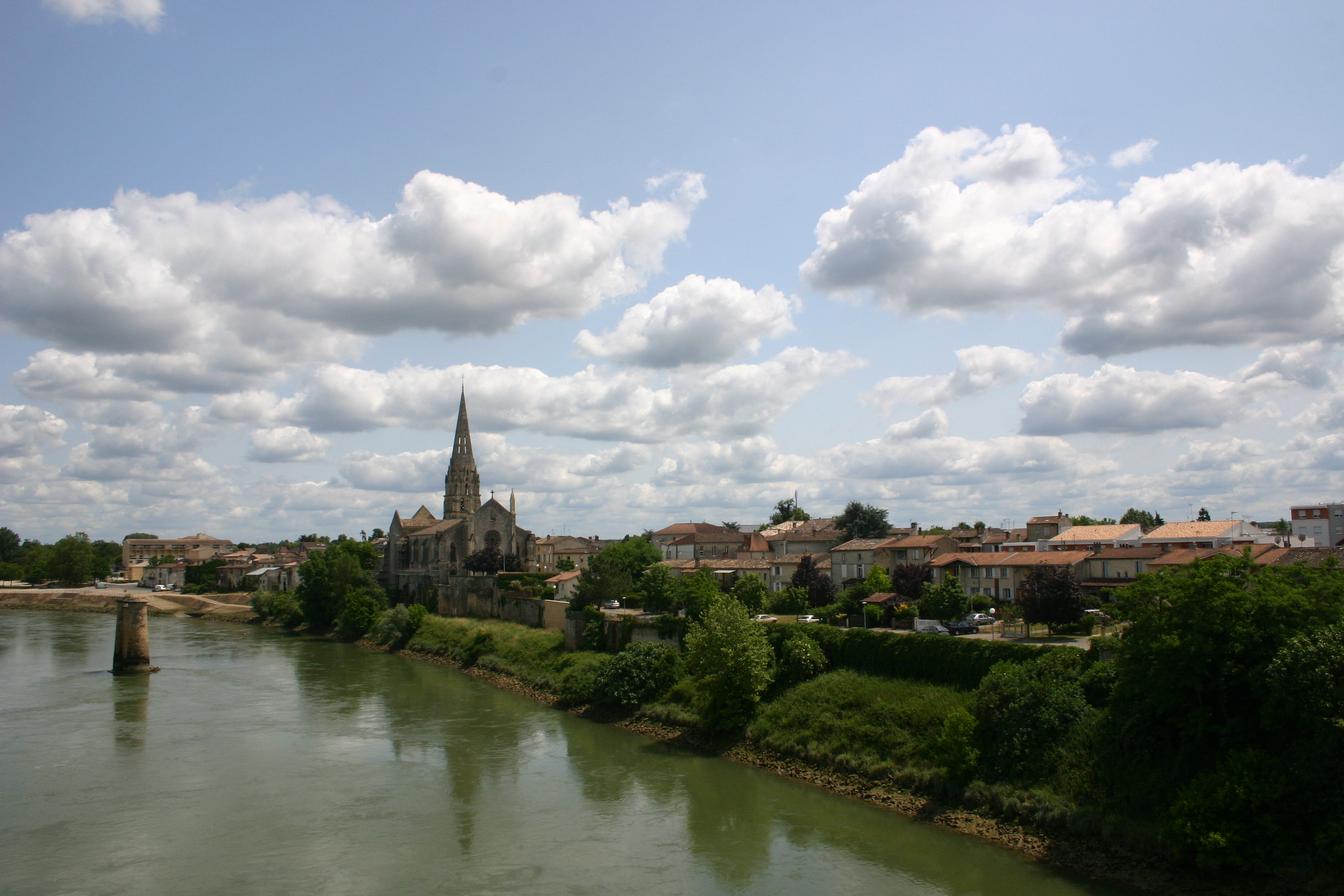
- Langon and the Garonne

- Flag Coat of arms
- Location of Langon
- Location within France Location within Nouvelle-Aquitaine
- Coordinates: 44°33′N 0°15′W
- Country: France
- Region: Nouvelle-Aquitaine
- Department: Gironde
- Arrondissement: Langon
- Canton: Le Sud-Gironde

Government
  - Mayor (2020–2026): Jérôme Guillem
- Area^{1}: 13.71 km^{2} (5.29 sq mi)
- Elevation: 23 m (75 ft)
- Highest elevation: 73 m (240 ft)
- Lowest elevation: 0 m (0 ft)
- Population (2023): 7,674
  - Density: 559.7/km^{2} (1,450/sq mi)
- Time zone: UTC+01:00 (CET)
  - Summer (DST): UTC+02:00 (CEST)
- INSEE/Postal code: 33227 /33210
- ^{1} French Land Register data, which excludes lakes, ponds, glaciers > 1 km^{2} (0.386 sq mi or 247 acres) and river estuaries.

Langon (French pronunciation: [lɑ̃ɡɔ̃]; Occitan: Lengon) is a commune in the Gironde department in Nouvelle-Aquitaine in southwestern France. Langon serves as the seat of its district, canton and subprefecture. Its inhabitants are called Langonnais and Langonnaise.

== Geography ==
Langon is in the southern part of the department 48 km (30 mi) southeast of Bordeaux on the left bank of the Garonne river. It lies within the wine-growing region of the Graves near the border with the forest of the Landes.

== Population ==
Historical population

Year	Pop.	±% p.a.
1793	3,267	—
1800	3,208	−0.26%
1806	3,222	+0.07%
1821	2,954	−0.58%
1831	3,566	+1.90%
1836	3,745	+0.98%
1841	3,986	+1.26%
1846	3,896	−0.46%
1851	3,953	+0.29%
1856	4,201	+1.22%
1861	4,114	−0.42%
1866	4,505	+1.83%
1872	4,647	+0.52%
1876	4,740	+0.50%
1881	4,704	−0.15%
1886	4,726	+0.09%
1891	4,733	+0.03%
1896	4,956	+0.93%
1901	4,816	−0.57%

Year	Pop.	±% p.a.
1906	4,836	+0.08%
1911	4,900	+0.26%
1921	4,588	−0.66%
1926	4,731	+0.62%
1931	4,661	−0.30%
1936	4,786	+0.53%
1946	5,177	+0.79%
1954	5,231	+0.13%
1962	5,375	+0.34%
1968	5,356	−0.06%
1975	5,843	+1.25%
1982	5,836	−0.02%
1990	5,842	+0.01%
1999	6,168	+0.61%
2007	7,272	+2.08%
2012	7,404	+0.36%
2017	7,375	−0.08%
2023	7,674	+0.66%

Source: EHESS and INSEE (1968-2023)

== Notable people born in Langon ==
- Louis Beaulieu (1840–1866), catholic priest, martyr in Korea
- Thomas Boudat
- Caroline Delas
- Louis Ducos du Hauron
- Benjamin Fall
- Martine Faure
- Édouard Lafargue
- Pierre de La Montagne
- Pierre Lees-Melou
- David Martimort, economist
- Raymond Oliver
- Sandrine Revel
- Jean Sentuary
- Patrick Zygmanowski (born in 1970), classical pianist

== Transport ==
Traditionally it was a stop on the Bordeaux-Toulouse route; the city is now served by the Entre-Deux-Mers autoroute. (A62 Bordeaux-Toulouse).

=== Itinéraire à Grand Gabarit ===
Langon is also a pivotal point in the Itinéraire à Grand Gabarit, the waterway and road route constructed to allow the transportation of the fuselage sections and wings of the Airbus A380 airliner to the final assembly point in Toulouse. These components were brought to Langon by barge, where they were transferred at a specially constructed dock to outsize road vehicles.

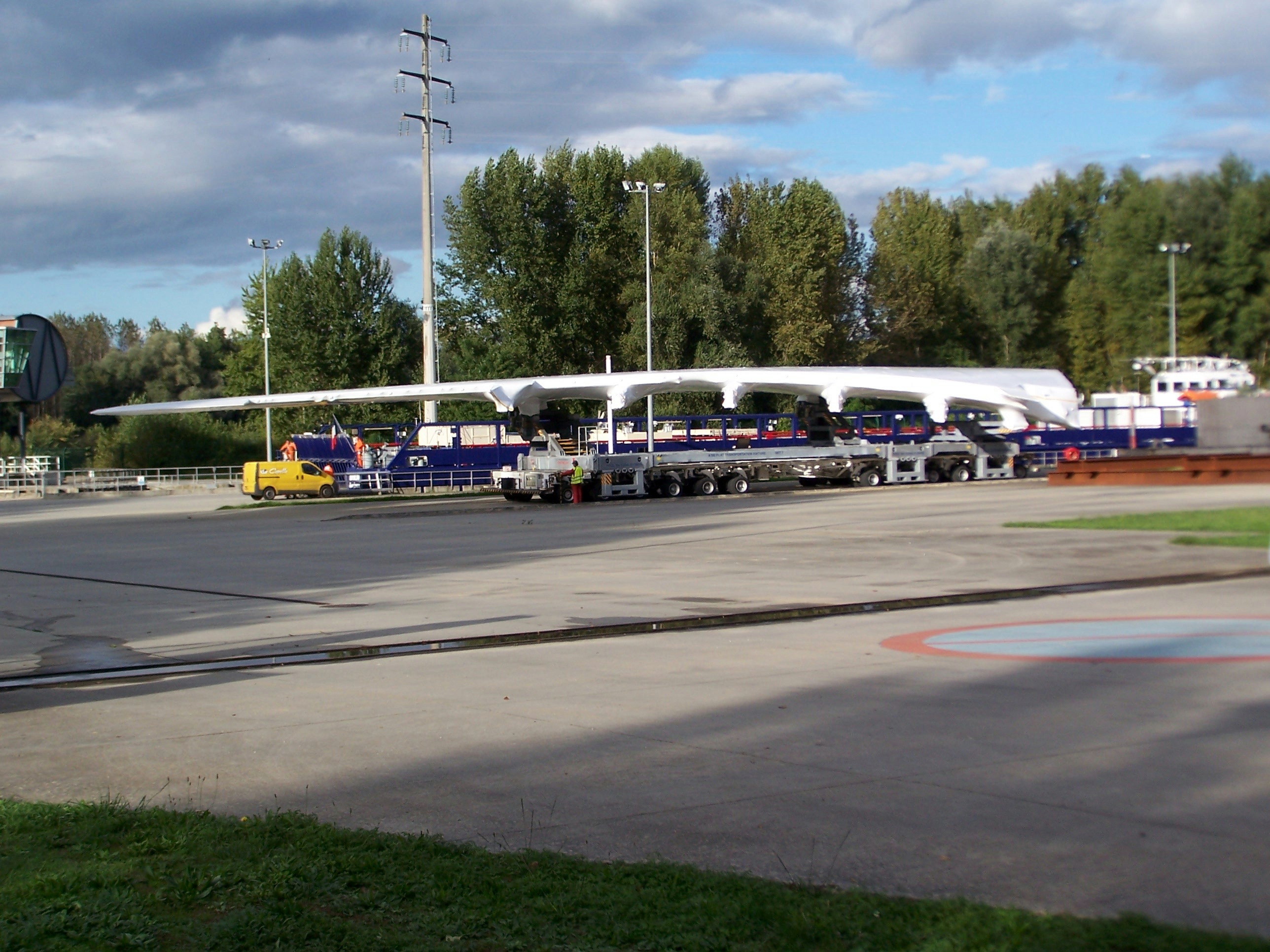
Barge at the quay

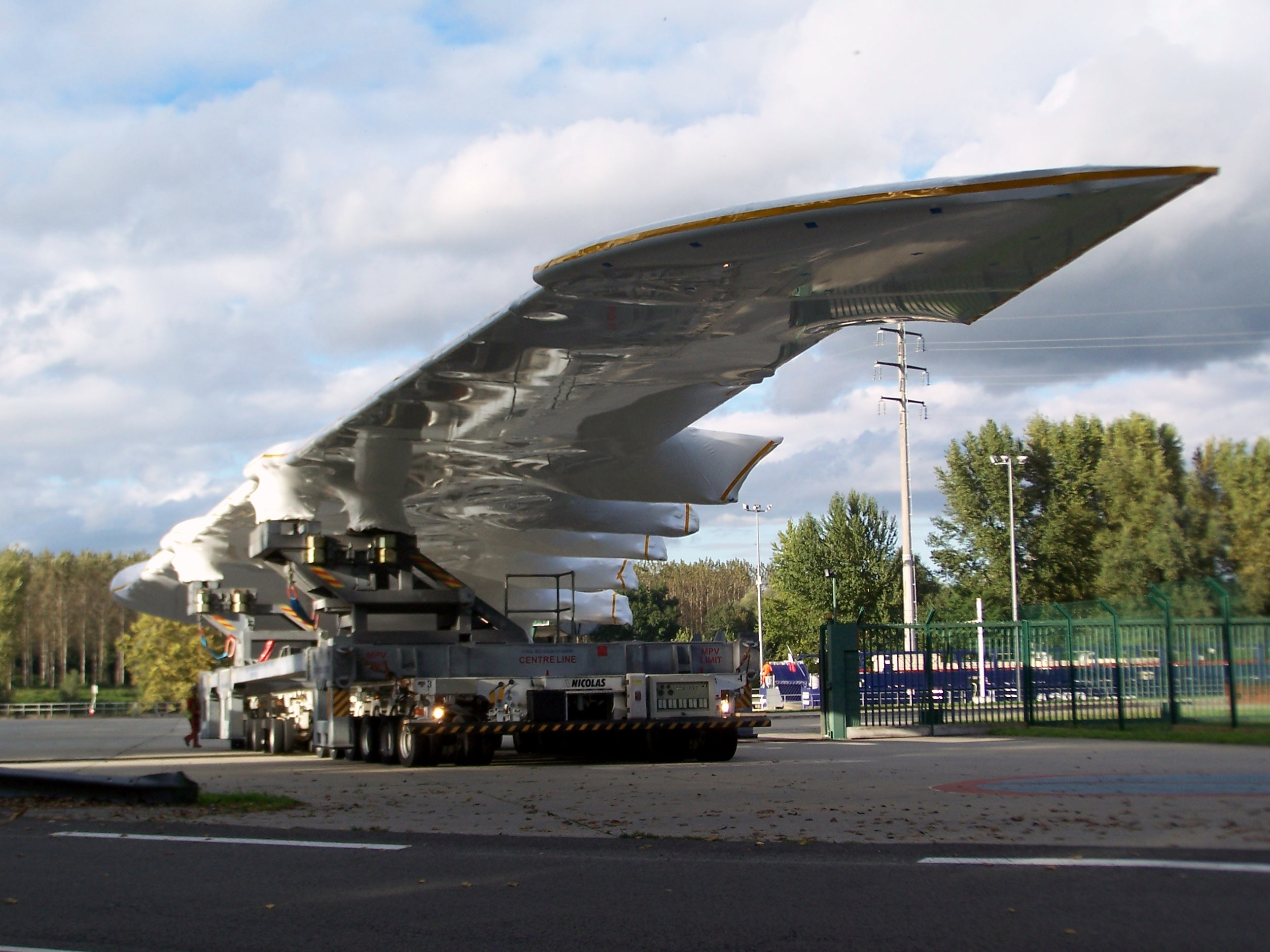
Wing leaving the quay

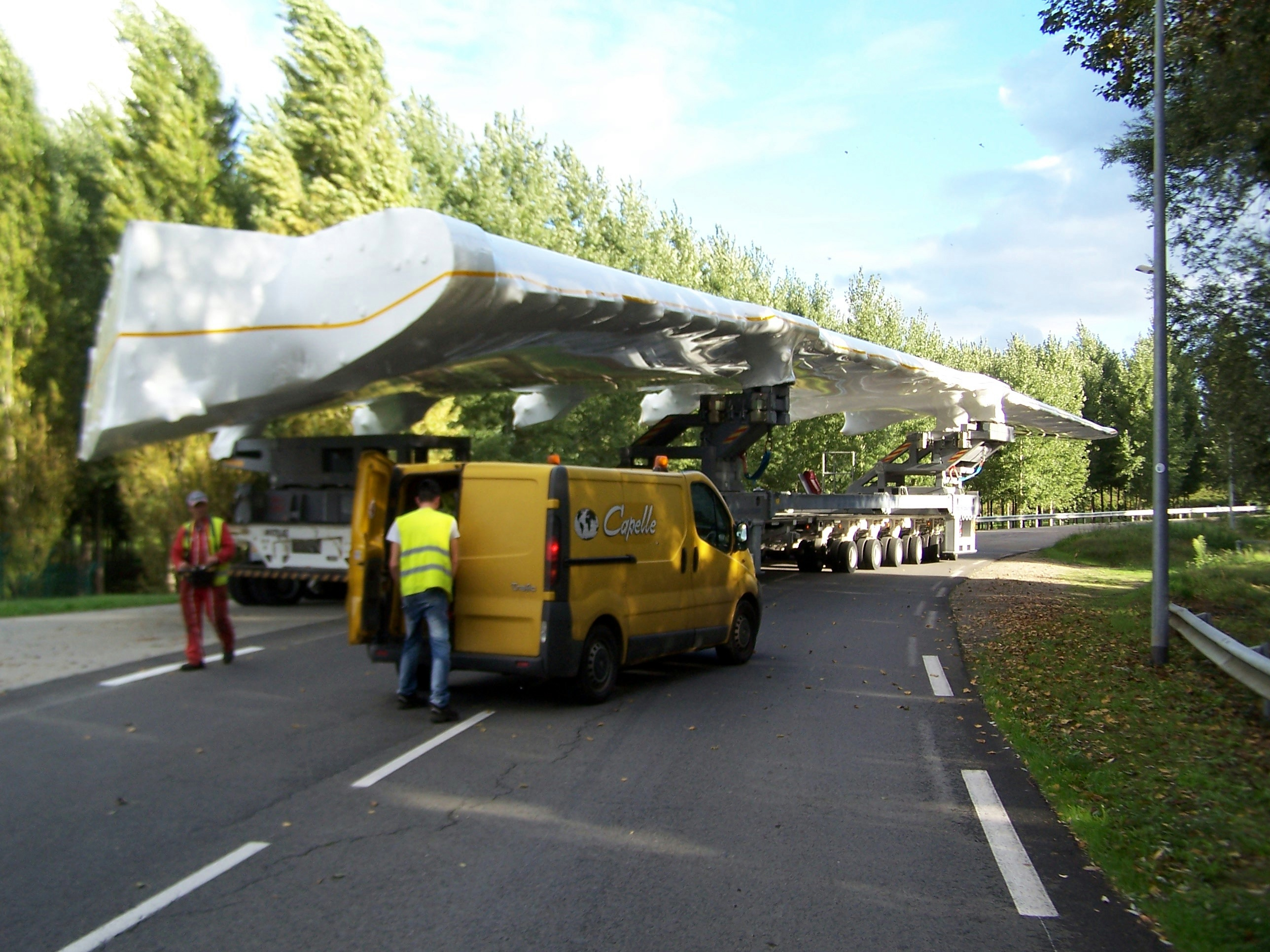
Transfer to holding compound

These then proceeded in convoy via an indirect southerly route to Toulouse.

The imposing crane just downstream of the Airbus quay was built by EDF in 1986 to handle materials for the construction of the nuclear power station at Golfech near Agen. It is still used to handle heavy electrical distribution items such as transformers.

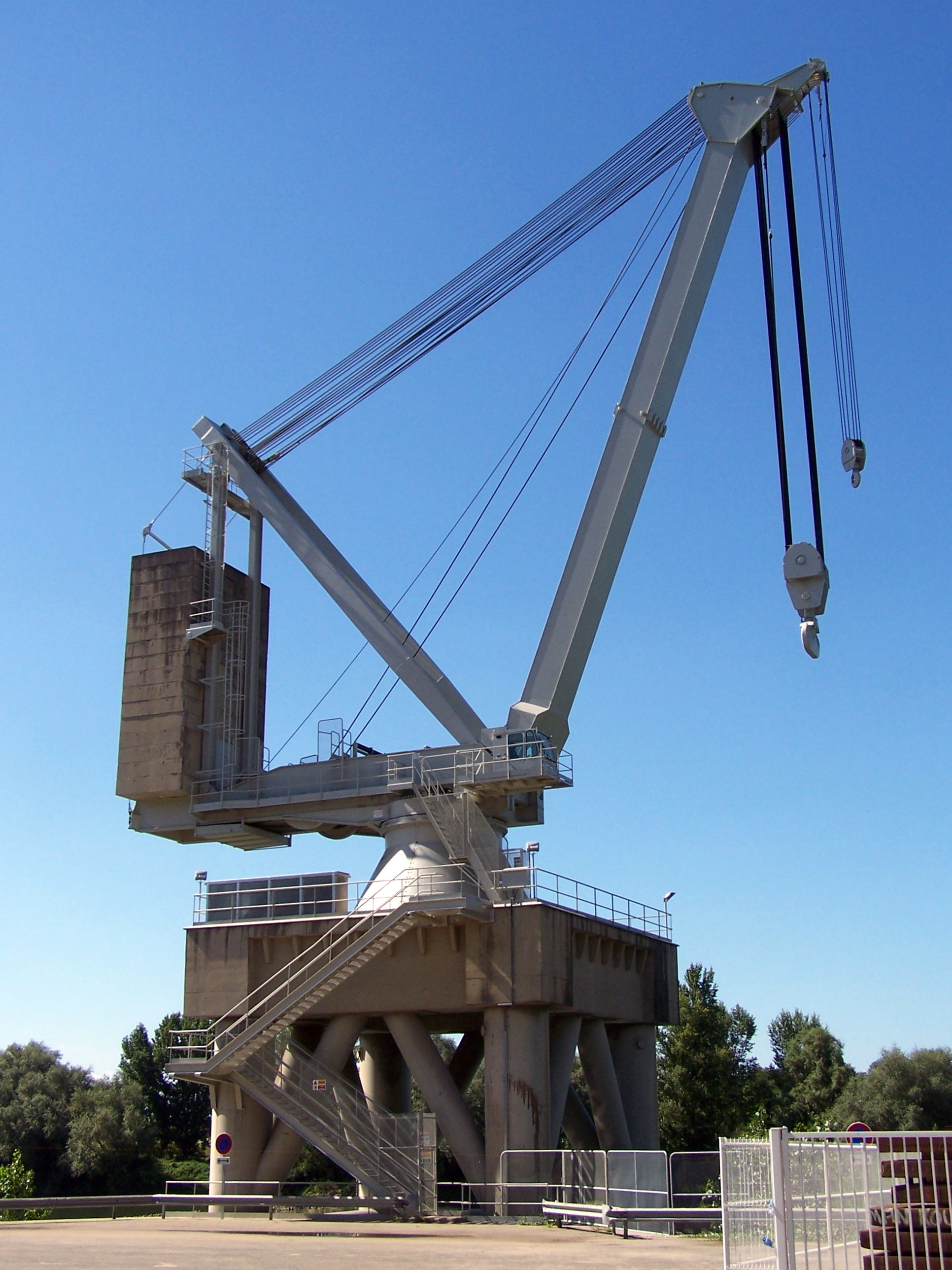
The EDF crane

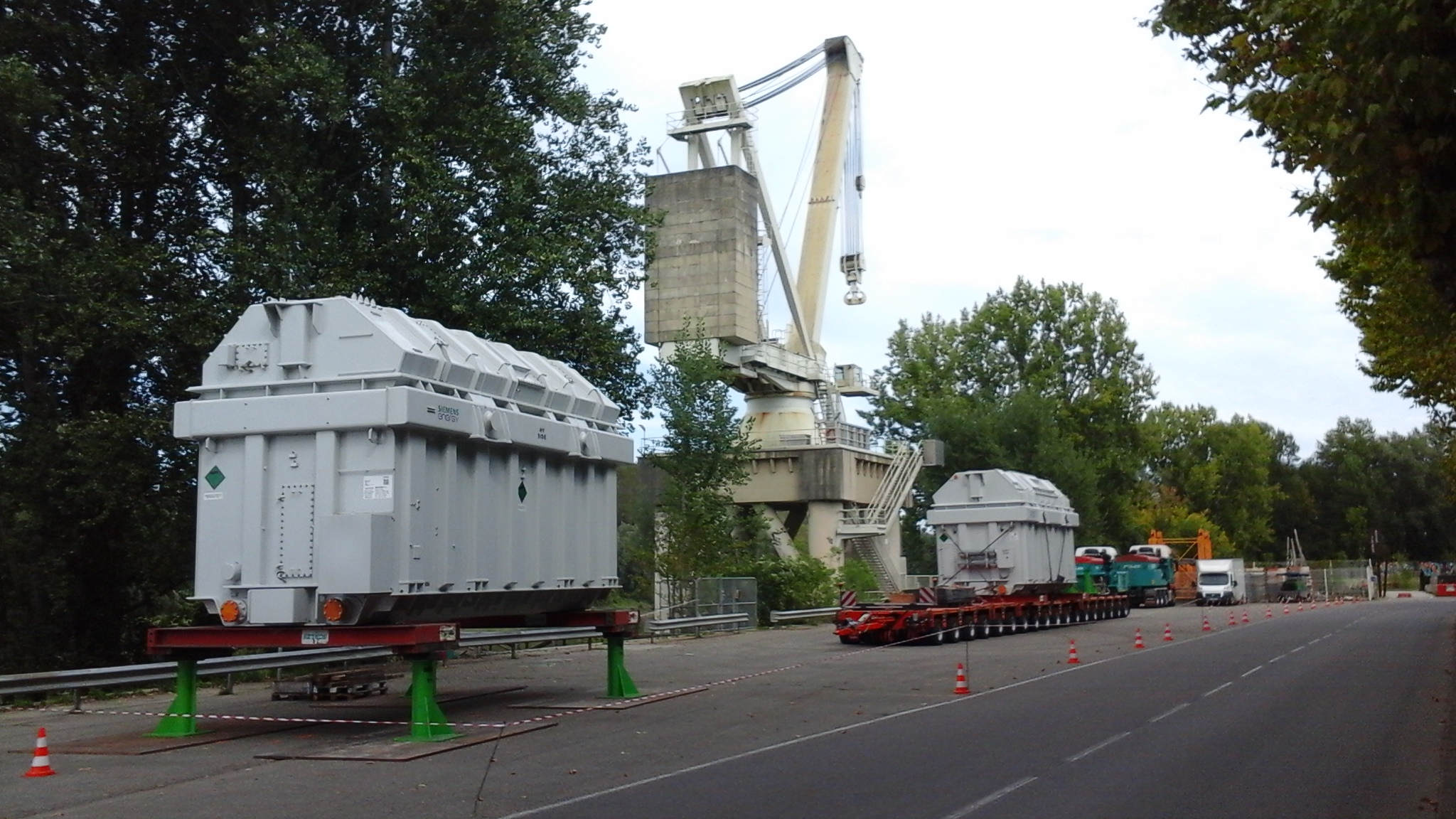
Transformers unloaded

=== Rail ===
Langon station has rail connections (TER Nouvelle-Aquitaine) to Bordeaux, Marmande and Agen.

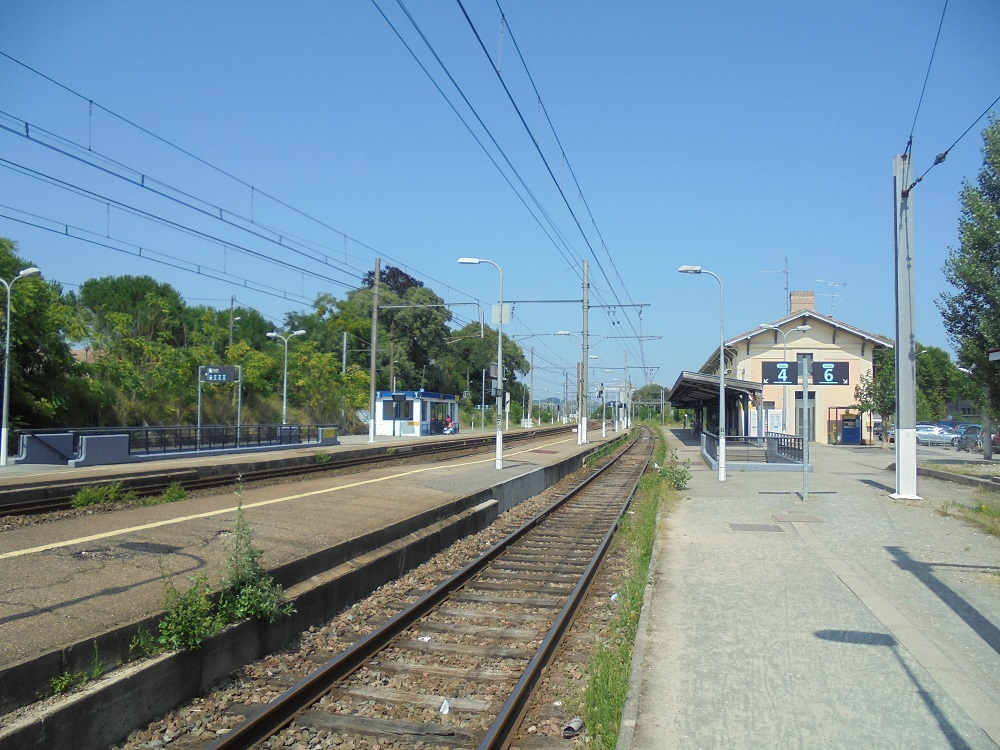

=== Bus ===
Buses at Langon are operated under the banner of the Nouvelle Aquitaine regional transport authority. Their website for buses in the area is https://transports.nouvelle-aquitaine.fr/cars-regionaux/reseau-et-horaires/gironde

Route / Line 501 connects Langon with Bordeaux along the D10 road, via Cadillac-sur-Garonne, Langoiran and Cambes, on the opposite bank of the river to the railway.

Routes 511 and 512 serve villages to the south and southeast.

== Sights ==
- Château de Respide
- Château de Roquetaillade

== Climate ==
Climate data for Langon (Cazats) (2002–2020 normals, extremes 2002–present)
Month	Jan	Feb	Mar	Apr	May	Jun	Jul	Aug	Sep	Oct	Nov	Dec	Year
Record high °C (°F)	20.4 (68.7)	25.2 (77.4)	28.8 (83.8)	30.1 (86.2)	32.5 (90.5)	40.1 (104.2)	40.4 (104.7)	40.0 (104.0)	38.7 (101.7)	32.1 (89.8)	24.2 (75.6)	20.8 (69.4)	40.4 (104.7)
Mean daily maximum °C (°F)	9.6 (49.3)	11.2 (52.2)	14.9 (58.8)	18.2 (64.8)	21.3 (70.3)	25.2 (77.4)	27.3 (81.1)	27.4 (81.3)	24.6 (76.3)	19.8 (67.6)	13.9 (57.0)	10.4 (50.7)	18.6 (65.5)
Daily mean °C (°F)	6.3 (43.3)	7.0 (44.6)	10.0 (50.0)	12.9 (55.2)	15.8 (60.4)	19.6 (67.3)	21.3 (70.3)	21.2 (70.2)	18.5 (65.3)	15.0 (59.0)	10.2 (50.4)	7.1 (44.8)	13.7 (56.7)
Mean daily minimum °C (°F)	3.1 (37.6)	2.7 (36.9)	5.1 (41.2)	7.6 (45.7)	10.4 (50.7)	14.0 (57.2)	15.3 (59.5)	15.1 (59.2)	12.5 (54.5)	10.2 (50.4)	6.4 (43.5)	3.7 (38.7)	8.8 (47.8)
Record low °C (°F)	−10.0 (14.0)	−11.6 (11.1)	−9.1 (15.6)	−2.5 (27.5)	0.7 (33.3)	4.9 (40.8)	8.1 (46.6)	8.2 (46.8)	3.7 (38.7)	−3.1 (26.4)	−6.5 (20.3)	−6.4 (20.5)	−11.6 (11.1)
Average precipitation mm (inches)	91.7 (3.61)	63.2 (2.49)	68.3 (2.69)	76.4 (3.01)	76.5 (3.01)	64.1 (2.52)	41.9 (1.65)	50.9 (2.00)	51.2 (2.02)	70.4 (2.77)	88.2 (3.47)	82.7 (3.26)	825.5 (32.50)
Average precipitation days (≥ 1.0 mm)	13.6	9.8	11.7	10.8	10.4	8.4	6.0	7.2	7.5	9.6	11.9	11.8	118.8
Source: Meteociel

== See also ==
- Communes of the Gironde department
