= Maillas =

- Commune
- Location of Maillas
- Location within France Location within Nouvelle-Aquitaine
- Coordinates: 44°14′56″N 0°11′44″W
- Country: France
- Region: Nouvelle-Aquitaine
- Department: Landes
- Arrondissement: Mont-de-Marsan
- Canton: Haute Lande Armagnac
- Intercommunality: Landes d'Armagnac

Government
  - Mayor (2020–2026): Jean-Luc Darroman
- Area^{1}: 63.84 km^{2} (24.65 sq mi)
- Elevation: 120 m (390 ft)
- Highest elevation: 152 m (499 ft)
- Lowest elevation: 88 m (289 ft)
- Population (2023): 125
  - Density: 1.96/km^{2} (5.07/sq mi)
- Time zone: UTC+01:00 (CET)
  - Summer (DST): UTC+02:00 (CEST)
- INSEE/Postal code: 40169 /40120
- ^{1} French Land Register data, which excludes lakes, ponds, glaciers > 1 km^{2} (0.386 sq mi or 247 acres) and river estuaries.

Maillas (Occitan: Malhàs) is a hamlet and commune in the Landes department in Nouvelle-Aquitaine in south-western France. It is situated on the Route nationale 524 (N524).

The N524 forms part of the Itinéraire à Grand Gabarit, a route which has been modified to allow its use by the oversize road convoys conveying body sections and wings of the Airbus A380 airliner. Updates to the road layout were necessary to facilitate the transit of the convoys through the commune, including adjustments to the vertical profile of the road.

== Politics ==
Since 2014, Maillas' mayor has been Jean-Luc Darroman, a former forest contractor of the Divers gauche. Prior to that, from 2001 to his retirement in 2014, the mayor was Christian Garbaye.

== See also ==
- Communes of the Landes department
