= Château de Respide =

Château in Nouvelle-Aquitaine, France

Coordinates: 44.5329°N 0.2250°W

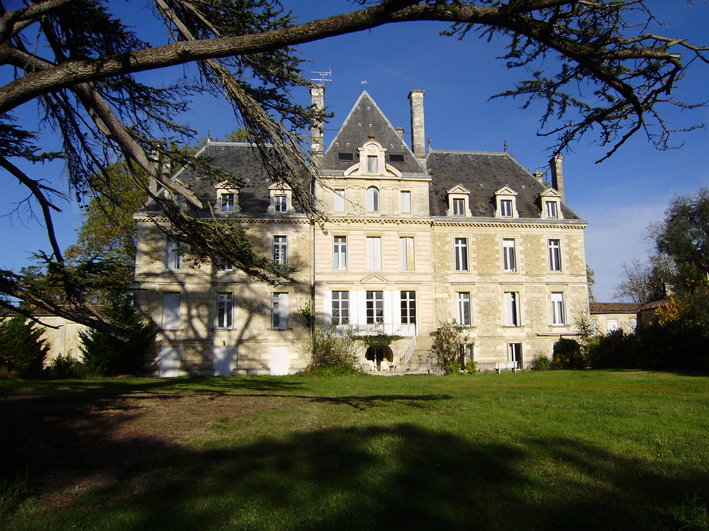
Château de Respide

The Château de Respide is a château in Langon, Gironde, located in Nouvelle-Aquitaine, France.
