= Patrick Zygmanowski =

French pianist

Patrick Zygmanowski (born 1970 in Langon) is a French classical pianist and piano teacher.
