= Lévignac =

- Commune
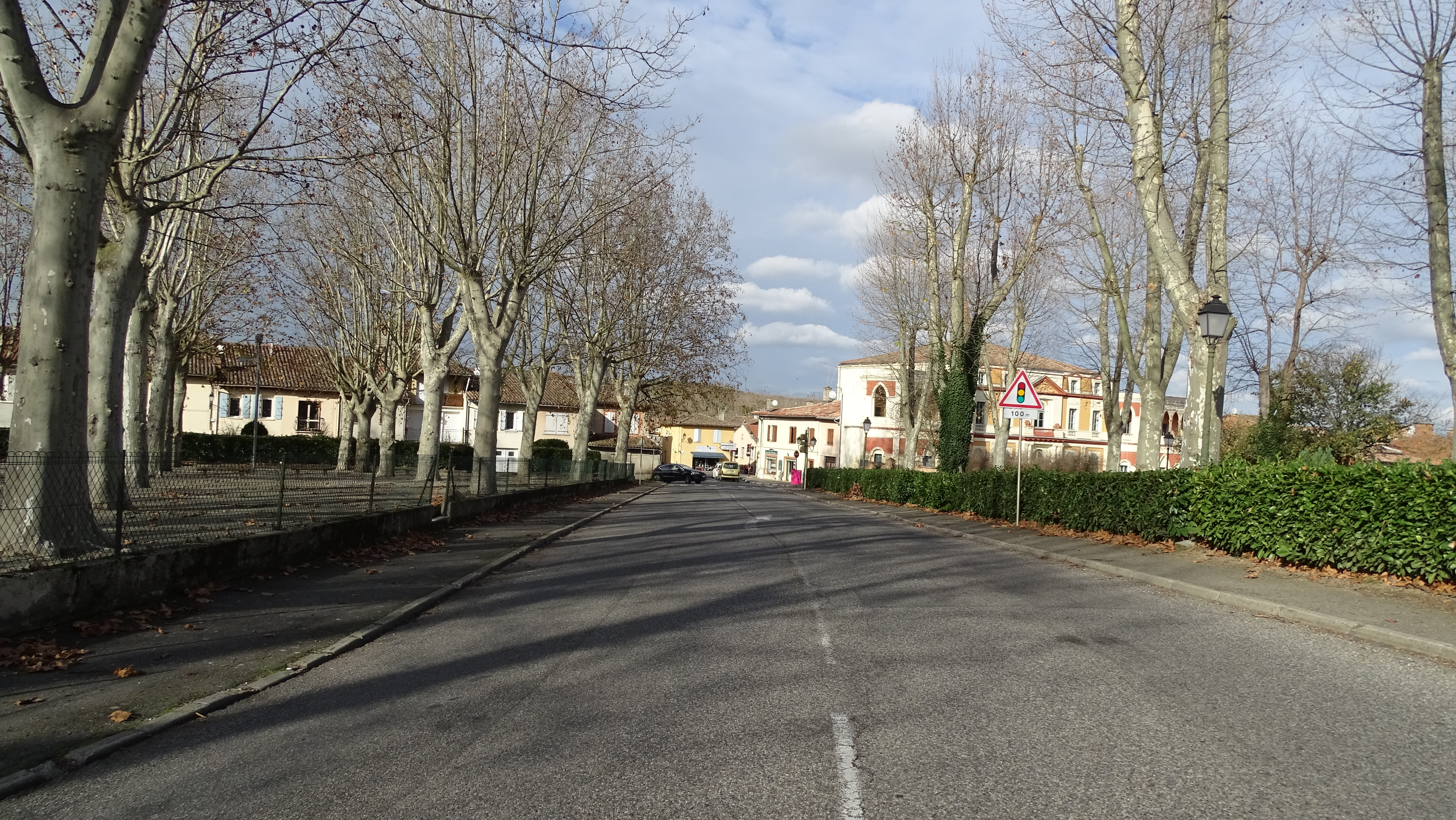
- The Place du Padouenc in Lévignac

- Coat of arms
- Location of Lévignac
- Location within France Location within Occitanie
- Coordinates: 43°40′01″N 1°11′43″E
- Country: France
- Region: Occitania
- Department: Haute-Garonne
- Arrondissement: Toulouse
- Canton: Léguevin
- Intercommunality: CC Le Grand Ouest Toulousain

Government
  - Mayor (2022–2026): Stéphane Charpentier
- Area^{1}: 12.22 km^{2} (4.72 sq mi)
- Elevation: 137 m (449 ft)
- Highest elevation: 235 m (771 ft)
- Lowest elevation: 123 m (404 ft)
- Population (2023): 2,206
  - Density: 180.5/km^{2} (467.6/sq mi)
- Time zone: UTC+01:00 (CET)
  - Summer (DST): UTC+02:00 (CEST)
- INSEE/Postal code: 31297 /31530
- ^{1} French Land Register data, which excludes lakes, ponds, glaciers > 1 km^{2} (0.386 sq mi or 247 acres) and river estuaries.

Lévignac (French pronunciation: [leviɲak]; Occitan: Levinhac, also known as Lévignac-sur-Save) is a commune in the Haute-Garonne department in southwestern France.

== Population ==
The inhabitants are known as Lévignacais in French.

Historical population
| Year | Pop. | ±% p.a. |
|---|---|---|
| 1968 | 748 | — |
| 1975 | 886 | +2.45% |
| 1982 | 1,080 | +2.87% |
| 1990 | 1,400 | +3.30% |
| 1999 | 1,624 | +1.66% |
| 2007 | 1,921 | +2.12% |
| 2012 | 1,963 | +0.43% |
| 2017 | 2,113 | +1.48% |
| 2023 | 2,206 | +0.72% |
Source: INSEE

== Transportation ==
Lévignac lies on the Itinéraire à Grand Gabarit, the route created specially for the oversized road conveying fuselage and wing sections of the Airbus A380 airliner to Toulouse for final assembly. The convoys, which run overnight at up to weekly frequency, travel down the main street of the town, with only centimetres clearance from the adjacent buildings. Major works on the main street were required to permit this, including new pedestrian paths, parking areas and lighting.

== See also ==
- Communes of the Haute-Garonne department
