= Itinéraire à Grand Gabarit =

Water and road route in France

Geographical logistics sequence for the A380, with final assembly in Toulouse

The Itinéraire à Grand Gabarit (French for 'oversize convoy route') is a water and road route that has been created in order to allow the transport of the outsize structural sections of the Airbus A380 airliner from their point of manufacture to Toulouse for final assembly. The route was largely created by modifying existing waterways and public roads, with the addition of some new road sections. Specially constructed ships, barges and road vehicles carry the aircraft parts on the route, as traditional transportation methods proved unfeasible. The parts are not handled directly.

Major sections of the fuselage of the A380 are built in northern France, Germany and Spain, whilst the wings are built in the United Kingdom. Due to the size of the A380, most of these parts are moved on the surface through the Itinéraire à Grand Gabarit, although some smaller parts are carried by the A300-600ST Beluga aircraft used in the construction of other, smaller, Airbus models.

== By ship to Bordeaux ==
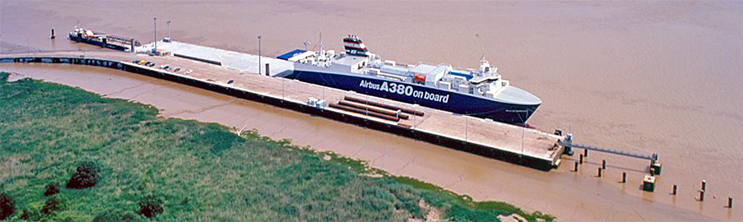
The Ville de Bordeaux at the Pauillac transfer dock; the barge Breuil can be seen to the left

The first stage of the route uses a fleet of three Roll-on/roll-off (RORO) ships; the Ville de Bordeaux (2004), the City of Hamburg (2008) and the Ciudad de Cadiz (2009). These ships are controlled by Fret Cetam SA, a joint venture between shipping companies Höegh Autoliners and Louis Dreyfus Armateurs, and leased to Airbus.

The front and rear sections of the fuselage are loaded aboard one of the fleet in Hamburg in northern Germany, after which the ship travels to Mostyn in the United Kingdom. The wings, which are manufactured at Filton in Bristol and Broughton in North Wales, are transported by barge on the River Dee to Mostyn docks, where the ship adds them to its cargo. The Ciudad de Cadiz went aground without cargo on sandbanks outside Mostyn in January 2013, when its moorings burst during high winds.

The next stop is Saint-Nazaire, in western France, where the ship trades the fuselage sections from Hamburg for larger, assembled sections, some of which include the nose. The ship then proceeds to Pauillac, the port of Bordeaux, where it unloads.

The ship then proceeds to Cádiz in southern Spain, where it picks up the belly and tail sections manufactured by Construcciones Aeronáuticas SA, and delivers them to Pauillac.

== By barge to Langon ==
From Pauillac, the A380 parts are transported by barge through the centre of Bordeaux on the River Garonne. The barges carry the parts to Langon, where a special dock has been built to permit the offloading of the barges.

New barges were developed to carry A380 parts. These incorporate ballast tanks, to enable the barges to adjust their water and air draughts to the prevailing conditions. Certain parts of the route must be undertaken at high tide in order to provide sufficient water under the keel, whilst the passage under the Pont de pierre in Bordeaux is undertaken at low tide to provide sufficient headroom.

The Canal de Garonne allows barges to go to Toulouse but has insufficient headroom for A380 parts, requiring parts to travel by road on the final leg of their journey.

== By road convoy to Toulouse ==
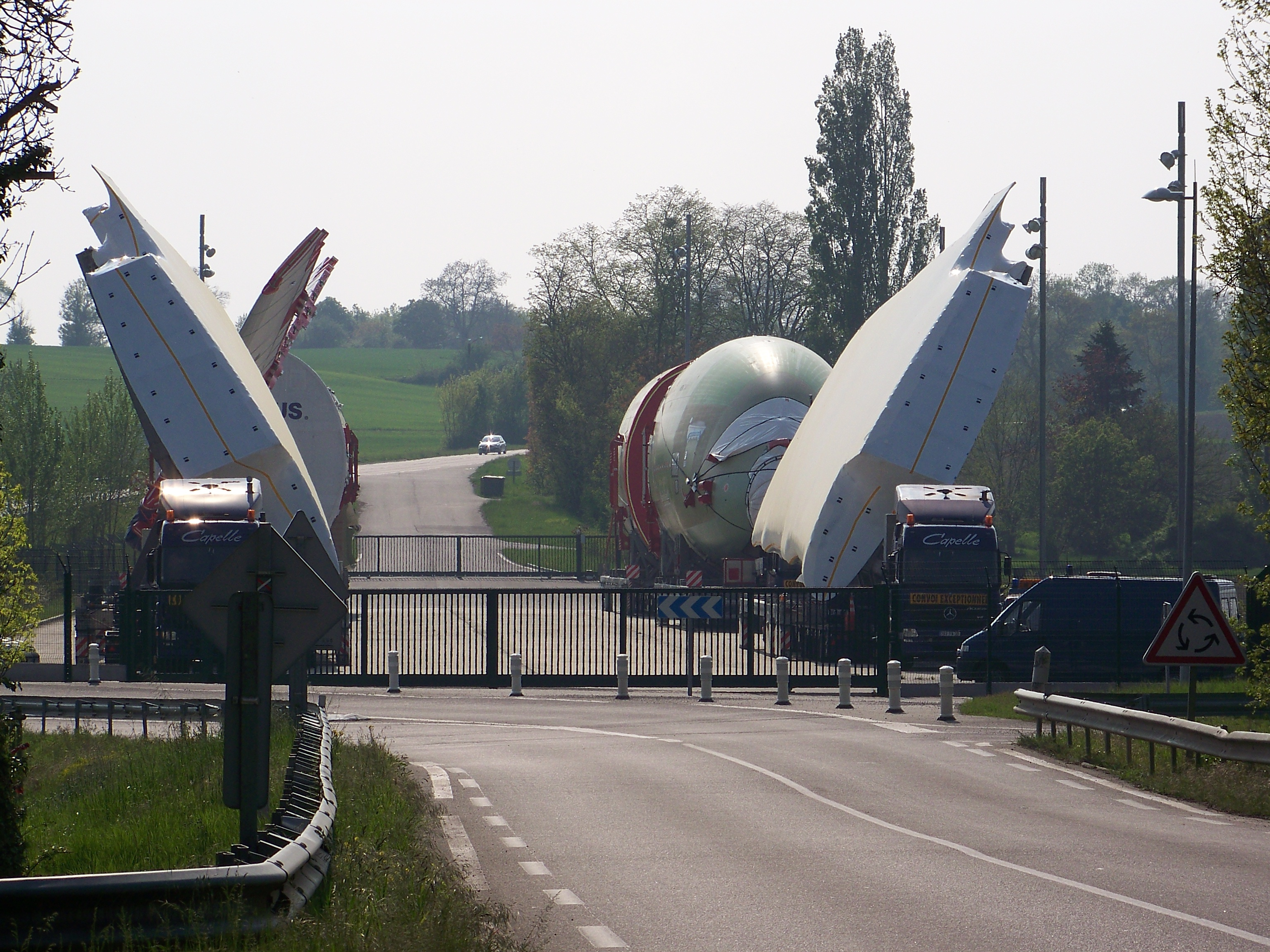
Road convoy in an intermediate layover point outside L'Isle-Jourdain

From Langon the parts are taken by oversize road convoys over a southerly, and indirect, route to Toulouse. The route was largely determined by the need to avoid any over-bridges. Many adjustments were necessary to junction and other layouts to allow the convoys to pass. In places new roads were constructed, some of which are reserved for the use of the convoys. Convoys travel mostly at night, laying over during the day at specially constructed secure parking areas.

The route passes through or past the following places, following the N524, N124 and N224 roads:

- Langon
- Bazas
- Bernos-Beaulac
- Captieux
- Maillas
- Losse
- Gabarret
- Barbotan-les-Thermes
- Eauze
- Dému
- Vic-Fezensac
- Saint-Jean-Poutge
- Auch
- Aubiet
- Gimont
- L'Isle-Jourdain
- Ségoufielle
- Lévignac
- Cornebarrieu

The section to Toulouse is designed for transporting a package of a size up to 14 meters high, 8 meters wide and 50 meters long.
