= Pierre de La Montagne =

French playwright, poet and translator

Pierre de La Montagne (1755, Langon – c. 1825) was an 18th–19th-century French playwright, poet and translator.

Prior to the French Revolution, the baron of La Montagne was correspondent of the Museum of Bordeaux then a member of the Académie des Sciences, Belles-lettres et Arts de Bordeaux.

From his youth, La Montagne showed a happy disposition for poetry and published his first essays in periodicals. In 1773, he addressed Stances à Voltaire malade. He also translated from English and Greek into French.

== Works ==
- 1791: Arabelle et Altamont, three-act tragedy, in verse. Paris, Creuze et comp., in-8°. (The subject of this tragedy is drawn from The New Heloise by J.-J. Rousseau.)
- 1808: La Bataille de Marengo, ode, Paris, S. A. Hugclet, October, in-8° de 16 p.
- 1801: Discours prononcé dans la cérémonie de la translation des cendres de Michel Montaigne, le prem. vendémiaire an IX., Bordeaux, in-8°.
- 1785: L’Enthousiaste, two-act comedy in verse, followed by Poésies fugitives, Paris, by the author, in-8°.
- Épitre à Grétry, in-8°.
- 1807: Épitre aux députés français, professant la religion juive, convoqués à Paris en grand Sanhédrin, Paris, Allut, in-8°, 8 pages.
- 1824: Le Hylozoïsme, ou la Matière animée, ode, Paris, by the author, in-8°, 12 pages.
- 1822: Laure et Pétrarque, églogue héroïque; followed by Stances à M. Ch. Pougens, Paris, by the author, in-8°, 16 pages. (The author, in a note, argues, without evidence and without foundation, that Laura de Noves was never married, that she always lived in Vaucluse where she was born and where she died, that we do not know her family, etc.)
- 1782: La Lévite conquise, poem in two songs, Amsterdam and Paris, Vve Ballard et fils, in-8°, 20 pages.
- 1816: La Mort, ode philosophique, Paris, Hugelet, in-8°, 16 pages.
- 1786: Les Nouvellistes, comedy in i act and in verse. Bordeaux, frères Labottière, in-8°. (Reprinted under the title Café de Rouen, Paris, Poinçot, 1786, in-8°.)
- 1814: Les Oreilles d’âne, tale, Paris, de l’imp. de Sétier, in-8°, 8 pages.
- 1796: Papelard, ou le Tartuffe philosophe et politique, comedy in 5 acts and in verse, de l’impr. du Cercle social, an IV, in-8°.
- 1781: La Physicienne, comedy in 1 act and in verse. Paris, Poincot, in-8°.
- 1789: Poésies diverses, Paris, Knayen, in-8°. (This volume contains a number of the author's youth plays.)
- 1810: Les Saints Stigmates, ode. Paris, de l’imp. de S. A. Hugelet, in-8°, 16 p.
- 1783: La Théatromanie, comedy in two acts and in verse. Amsterdam and Paris, Cailleau, in-8°.
- 1818: La Transfiguration par Raphaël, ode, Paris, l’Auteur; Hugelet, in-8°, 16 p.
- 1805: La Vestale, poème en IV chants, Paris, F. Cocheris fils, in-12, 35 p.

== Translations ==
- 1788: La Visite d’été, by Clower;
- 1789: Cornelia Sedley, anonymous;
- 1791: De l’influence des passions sur les maladies du corps, by Falcomneu;
- 1791: Lettres écrites de France à une amie d’Angleterre, by miss Williams;
- 1791: Mémoires sur l’Inde, by Hastings;
- 1795: Le Banquet de Xénophon, transl. from Greek and added to Life of Xenophon, by M. Fortia d’Urban, in-8°;
- 1796: Klbelinde, ou la Recluse du lac, by Ch. Smith;
- 1808: L’Histoire d’Irlande, by Gordon.

== Sources ==
- Quérard, Joseph-Marie (1833). La France littéraire;ou Dictionnaire bibliographique des savants, historiens et gens de lettres de la France: ainsi que des littérateurs étrangers qui ont écrit en français, plus particulièrement pendant les XVIIIe XIXe (in French). Vol. 4. Firmin Didot. p. 503..
