= Pont de pierre (Bordeaux) =

Coordinates: 44°50′18.47″N 0°33′46.98″W

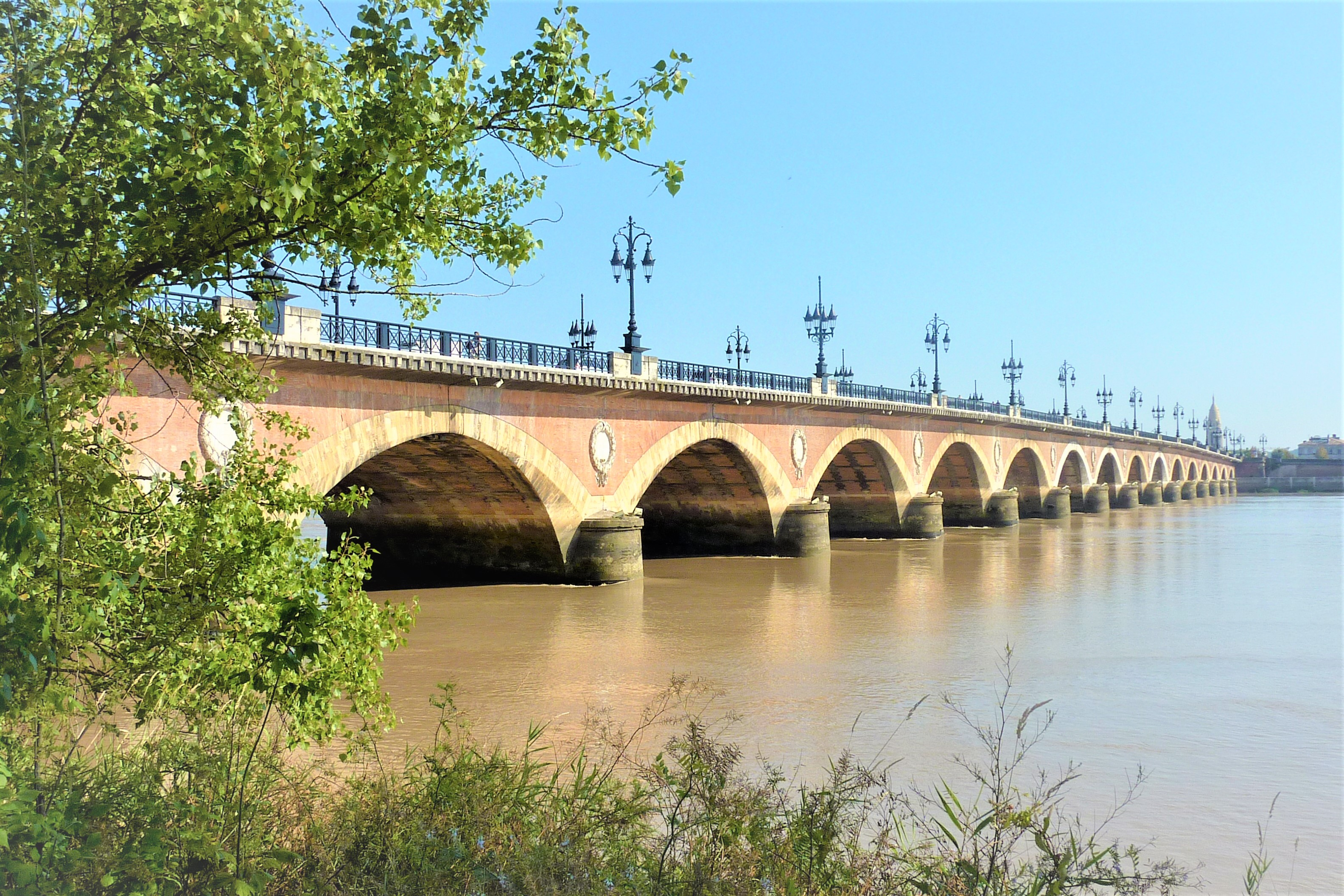
- Pont de pierre

General information
- Location: Bordeaux, France
- Construction started: 1819
- Completed: 1822
- Owner: Bordeaux Métropole

Design and construction
- Architect: Claude Deschamps
- Structural engineer: Jean-Baptiste Basilide Billaudel
- Main contractor: Compagnie du pont de Bordeaux (since 1818)

The Pont de pierre, or "Stone Bridge" in English, is a bridge in Bordeaux, (in the Gironde department of France), which connects the left bank of the river Garonne (cours Victor Hugo) to the right bank quartier de la Bastide (Avenue Thiers).

It is 487 m (1,598 ft) in length and 19 m (62 ft) wide. It constitutes the legal frontier between the maritime domain and the river domain in the port of Bordeaux.

== Name and translation ==
"Stone bridge" is the usual translation of "Pont de pierre", however the real meaning of the French phrase "pont de pierre" is "masson bridge". As a matter of fact, the bridge is built mainly of brick and not stone.

== Overview ==
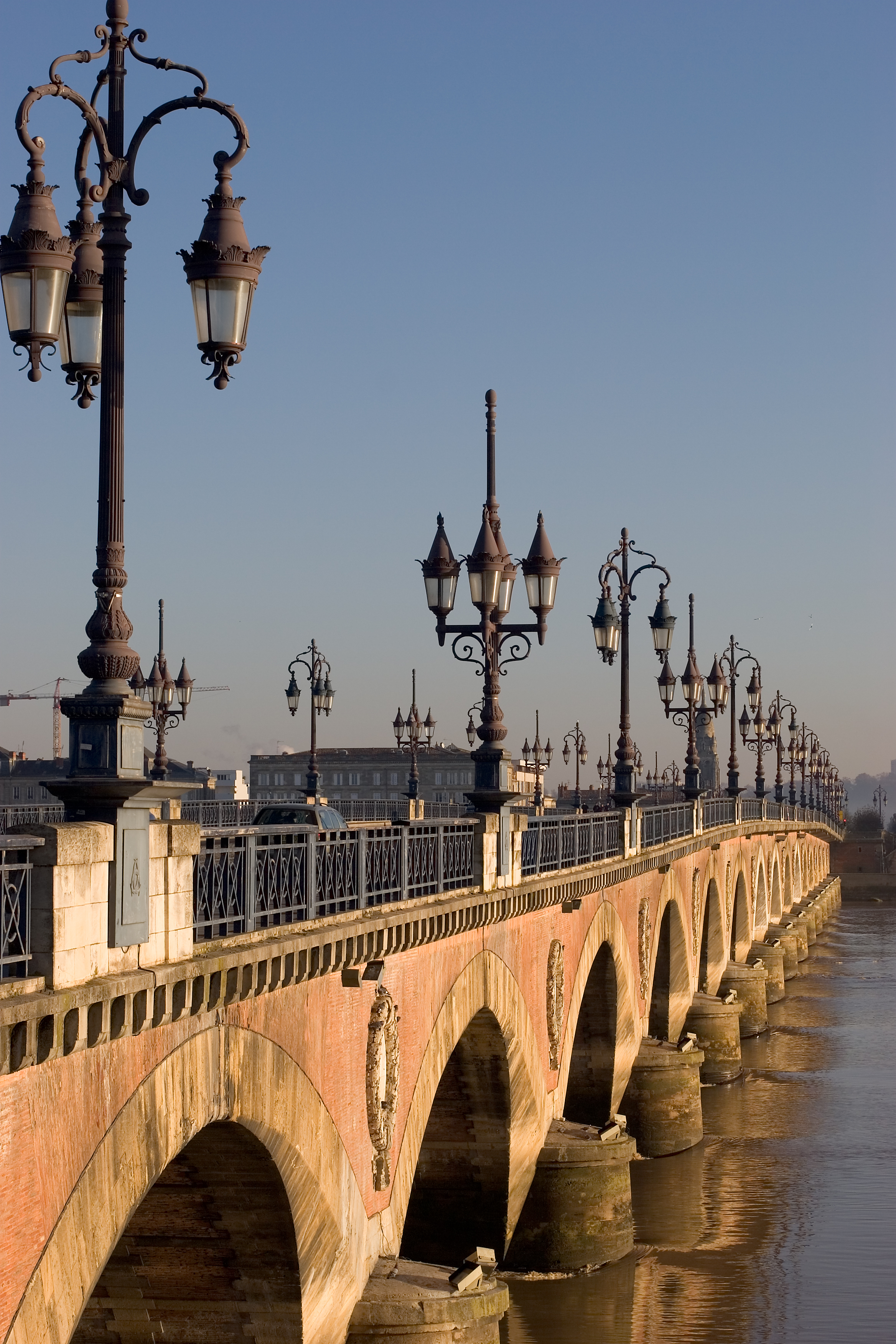
Pont de pierre

First bridge over the river Garonne at Bordeaux, the Pont de pierre was planned and designed during the First French Empire, under the orders of Napoleon I. As he campaigned in Spain, he needed his troops cross rapidly the river, and the original project envisaged a wood bridge, easier to build. Until then, it was necessary to cross the river by boat. Due to lack of resources, the construction took place subsequently, during the Bourbon Restoration, from 1819 to 1822. During these three years, the builders were faced with many challenges because of the strong current and the high tidal range, 6 m (20 ft), at that point in the river. They used a diving bell borrowed from the British to stabilise the bridge's pillars.

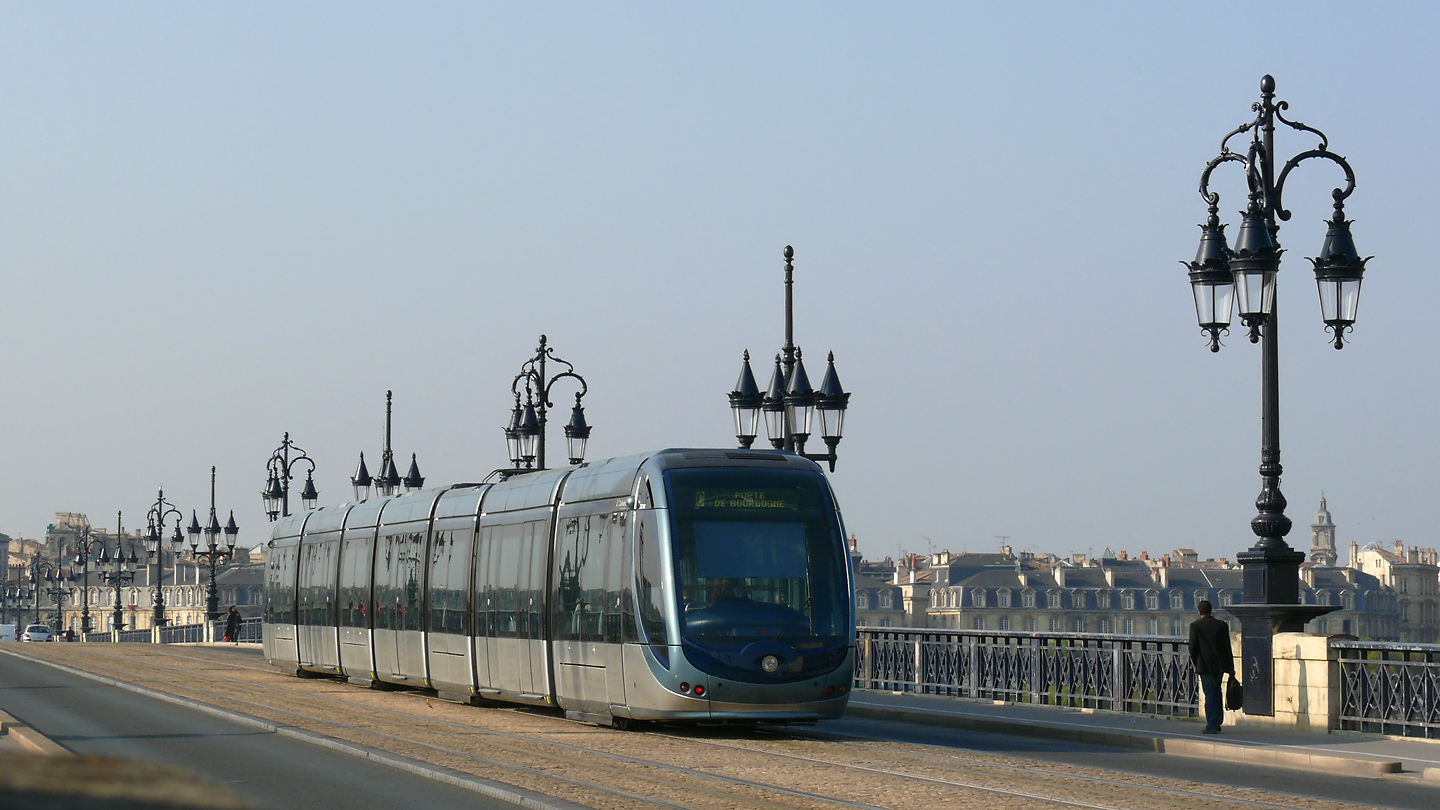
Tramway crossing the Pont de pierre

The bridge has 17 arches (according to the legend the number of letters in the name 'Napoléon Bonaparte'). On the sides, each pile of bricks is capped by a white medallion that were to receive the cipher of Louis XVIII, a double L.

It was the only bridge in Bordeaux until the completion of the railway bridge Passerelle Eiffel in 1860 and the only road bridge until the construction of pont Saint-Jean (Bordeaux) in 1965.

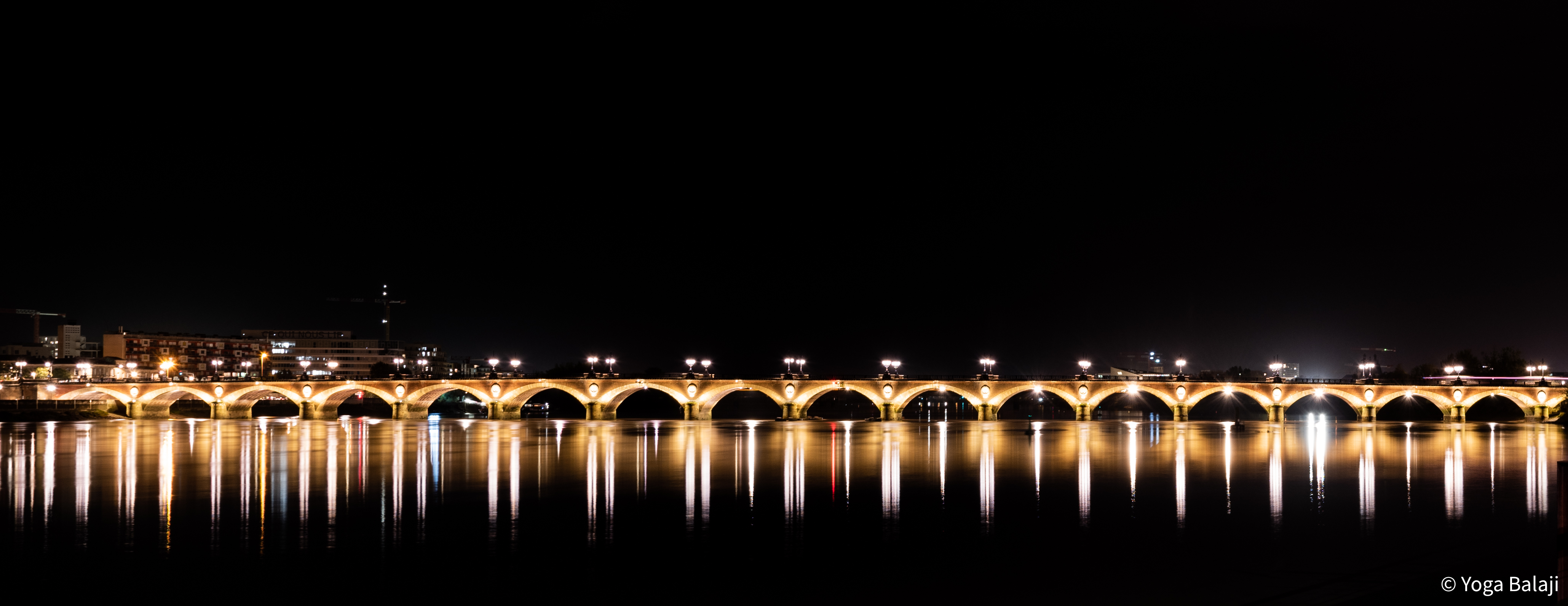
Pont de Pierre, Night View

The bridge and its tide was an important point in the Itinéraire à Grand Gabarit, the logistic schedule transporting parts for the Airbus A380 production.

Since 2016, the condition of the bridge makes it now permanently closed to traffic except for pedestrians, cyclists, trams, buses, taxis and emergency vehicles.

== Postage stamp ==
On 26 April 2004, a tourist stamp was issued for €0.50 in Bordeaux. It shows the bridge and a train Pierre tramway de Bordeaux inaugurated on 21 December 2003. Contrary to what the stamp shows, the tram passes along the bridge and not on a second bridge alongside. The design is the work of Claude Andréotto, engraved by Claude Jumelet for printing intaglio. The stamp was withdrawn from sale on 12 November 2004.

== See also ==
- List of bridges in Gironde
- List of bridges in France
- Station Porte de Bourgogne (Tram de Bordeaux) (left bank) and Station Stalingrad (Tram de Bordeaux) (right bank)
