= Jean-Jacques Duval d'Eprémesnil =

French magistrate and politician (1745–1794)

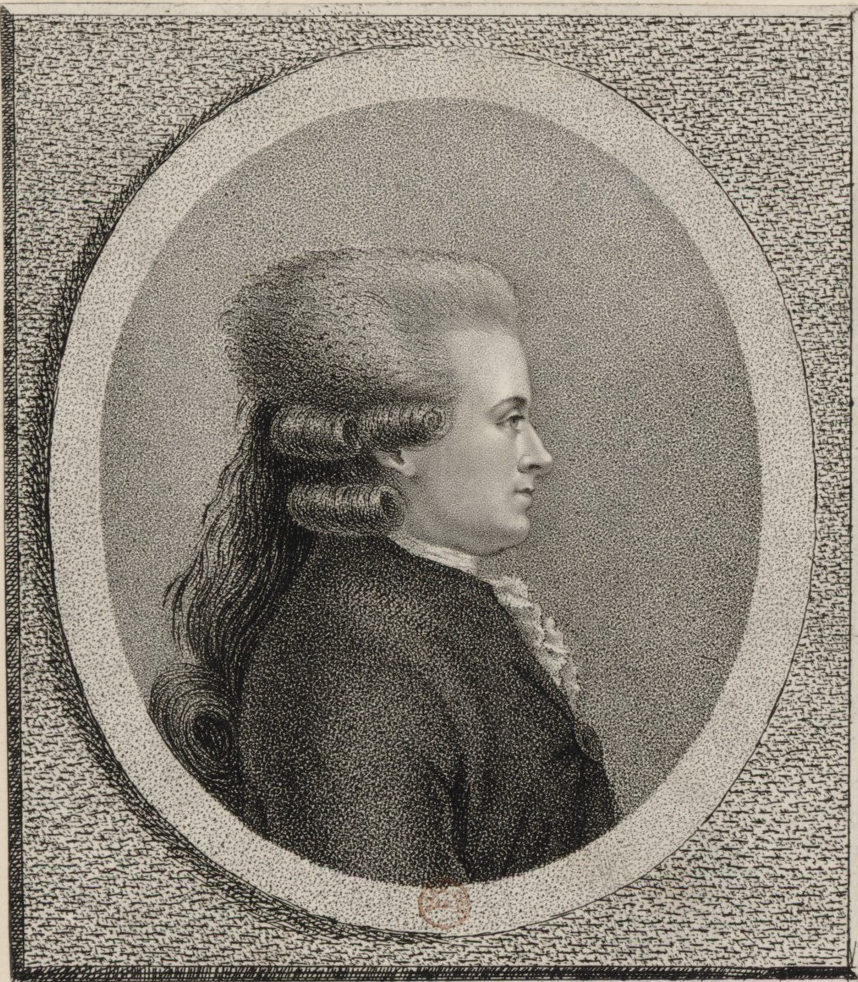
Engraved portrait of Jean-Jacques Duval d'Eprémesnil

Jean-Jacques Duval d'Eprémesnil (5 December 1745 – 22 April 1794), French magistrate and politician, was born in India at Pondicherry, his father being a colleague of Joseph François Dupleix.

Returning to France in 1750 he was educated in Paris for the law, and became in 1775 conseiller in the parlement of Paris, where he soon distinguished himself by his zealous defence of its rights against the royal prerogative. He showed bitter enmity to Marie Antoinette in the matter of the diamond necklace, and on 19 November 1787 he was the spokesman of the parlement in demanding the convocation of the states-general.

When the court retaliated by an edict depriving the parlement of its functions, Eprémesnil bribed the printers to supply him with a copy before its promulgation, and this he read to the assembled parlement. A royal officer was sent to the palais de justice to arrest Eprémesnil and his chief supporter Goislard de Montsabert, but the parlement (5 May 1788) declared that they were all Eprémesnils, and the arrest was only effected on the next day on the voluntary surrender of the two members.

After four months' imprisonment on the island of Ste Marguerite, Eprémesnil found himself a popular hero, and was returned to the states-general as deputy of the nobility of the outlying districts of Paris. But with the rapid advance towards revolution his views changed; in his Réflexions impartiales ... (January 1789) he defended the monarchy, and he led the party among the nobility that refused to meet with the third estate until summoned to do so by royal command.

In the Constituent Assembly he opposed every step towards the destruction of the monarchy. He narrowly escaped the fury of the Parisian populace on 17 July 1792 when he was attacked by a mob near the Palais Royale. After being rescued by his business partner, Scotsman William Playfair, he was taken into custody by Jérôme Pétion de Villeneuve, mayor of Paris, and imprisoned in the Abbey of Saint-Germain-des-Prés, but was set at liberty before the September Massacres. In September 1793, however, he was again arrested, this time at Le Havre, taken to Paris, and denounced to the Convention as an agent of Pitt. He was brought to trial before the revolutionary tribunal on 21 April 1794, and was guillotined the next day.

D'Eprémesnil's speeches were collected in a small volume in 1823. See also Henri Carré, Un Précurseur inconscient de la Révolution (Paris, 1897).
