= Nicolas Beaujon =

French banker (1718–1786)

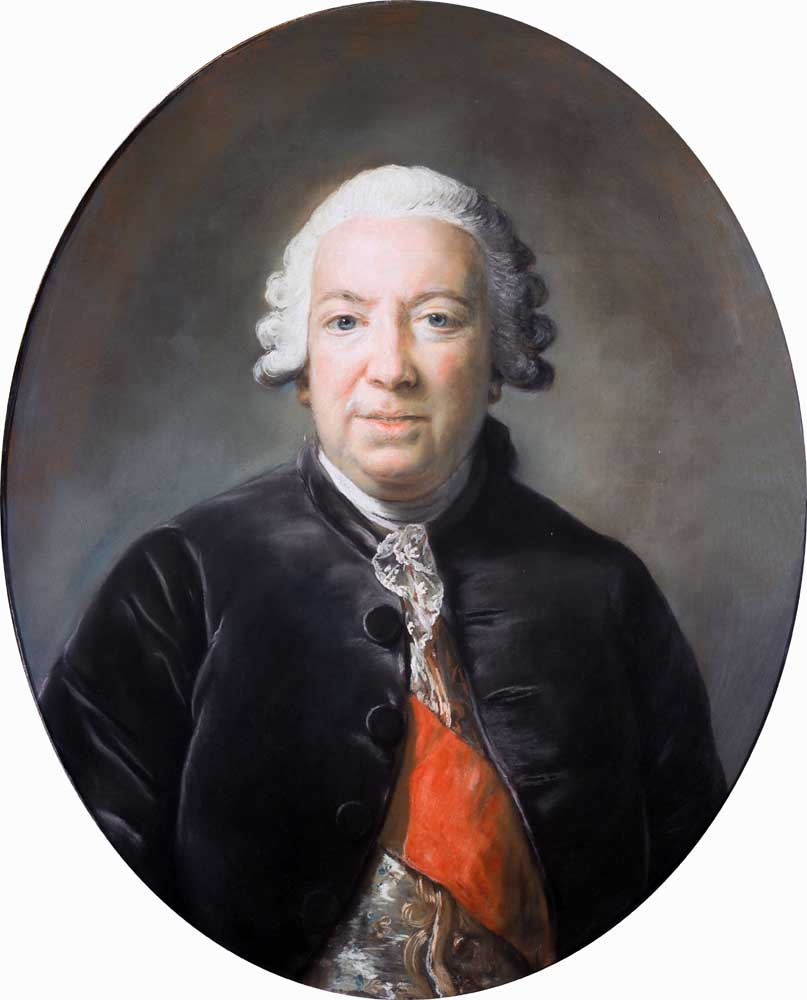
- portrait by Élisabeth Louise Vigée Le Brun, 1784
- Born: 28.04.1718; Bordeaux, France
- Died: 20.12.1786; Paris, France
- Occupation: Banker

Nicolas Beaujon (1718–1786) was a wealthy French banker at the court of King Louis XV. The portrait of Nicolas Beaujon seen here was painted by Élisabeth Vigée-Lebrun in 1784.

== Youth and early career ==
Born in Bordeaux, the scion of two very wealthy local commercial families, the Beaujons and the Delmestres, Nicolas's father, Jean, had greatly increased his families' fortunes in the course of saving Bordeaux from disaster twice by timely acquisitions and importations of grain during catastrophic famines early in the eighteenth century. Nicolas Beaujon, the eldest son, followed in the family footsteps and early made a fortune in commodities, mostly grain, and most notably during yet another famine. These were uncommonly frequent in France during this period due to a combination of outdated administrative practices making it cumbersome for the government to bring stocks of grain to where they were needed quickly enough to make a difference. Private entrepreneurs often stepped in at this sort of juncture, alleviating the misery whilst lining their own pockets.

As was sometimes the case when private individuals undertook large relief operations for a profit, charges of profiteering arose from some critical locals. Beaujon was proved innocent of any wrongdoing in a court of law (though to be fair he had made a tidy sum saving his city) but finding the scope of the provinces too restrictive for someone of his talents and ambitions anyway, he removed to Paris where he was to remain until the end of his days. (Some later writers would assert that he fled Bordeaux due to unpopularity following his "profiteering" in connection with the famine, but Masson shows that this was clearly not true, being more probably a case of the sort of calumny the extremely rich always seem to attract.) The vast Beaujon townhouse in Bordeaux still exists, though Nicolas sold it off at the time of his marriage, in 1753, to Louise Elisabeth Bontemps, herself a granddaughter of Alexandre Bontemps, Louis XIV's First Valet and Intendant of Versailles (and one of the only eyewitnesses to the King's secret marriage to Françoise d'Aubigné, marquise de Maintenon).

== Banker to the court of Louis XV ==
Once established in the capital, Beaujon rapidly emerged as one of the richest men in France, playing a crucial role in the financing of the government of Louis XV, in particular by lending enormous sums (in the millions, year after year) during the Seven Years' War, which enabled the French Navy, bankrupt as was the rest of the government, to continue to function. During this period he became a Farmer General (Under the royal French fiscal system, the responsibility for tax collection was "farmed out" for a fee to private individuals who were responsible for meeting a set quota for the year; anything else they collected reverted to themselves; considerable fortunes were made entirely legally in this way.). Around this time he also gained entry into the Conseil d'Etat under Louis XV. Perhaps the richest private individual in France in his day, and certainly the best connected financially, Beaujon also served as the private banker to many persons of rank or position, most notably to Madame du Barry, the last official mistress of Louis XV.

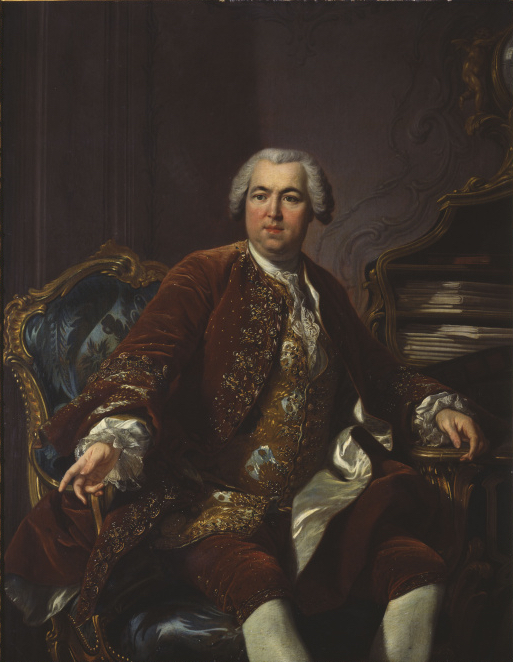
Nicolas Beaujon by Louis-Michel van Loo

== Owner of the Elysée Palace ==
In 1773, he bought, for the price of one million livres fixed by the Abbé de Terray, the Hôtel d'Évreux in Paris (today known as the Élysée Palace, the official residence of the President of France). He employed the architect Étienne-Louis Boullée to make substantial alterations to the buildings and to design an English-style garden. On display was his massive art collection which included such well-known masterpieces as Holbein's "The Ambassadors" (now in the National Gallery, London), and Frans Hals' "Bohemian" (now at the Louvre). His architectural alterations and art galleries gave this residence international renown as "one of the premier homes of Paris". Beaujon owned it until the year of his death, when he transferred the property to King Louis XVI. Years later writer Count Alfred de Vigny would reside there with his parents, and under Napoleon, Joachim Murat, King of Naples and Sicily, lived there until the Emperor designated it the official residence of his son and heir the little "King of Rome". Napoleon was also to sign his abdication at the palace in Beaujon's "silver boudoir". Other famous residents included Russian Tsar Alexander I, the Duke of Wellington, and Louis XVIII's nephew the Duke of Berry. The Elysée only became the Presidential Palace in 1848, which it has remained to this day.

In addition to his city palace, Beaujon also commissioned the architect Girardin to create a "folie" for him on the considerable land attached to his principal residence (it extended in a wide band running to the north of the Champs-Élysées all the way to the modern Arc de Triomphe). This pleasure palace was built in an exotic style with a large central pavilion anchoring four attached apartments wherein he lodged his four mistresses of the day who, it was said, more than tolerated each other, inviting each other to dine and socialize in their suites with or without their patron. At times Beaujon would have them all together in his central apartment to amuse him of an evening with their brilliant conversation and other charms. It is to be mentioned that this harem-like existence is only attested for the period after the early death of his wife in 1769. They had had no children, and Beaujon never remarried, having found this alternative domestic arrangement more to his liking.

He did, according to some historians, have an illegitimate daughter, Adelaïde de Praël de Surville, who took her name from the man Beaujon arranged for her mother, Louise Dalisse, a famous dancer at the Comédie-Française under the name of "Chevrier", his mistress, to marry in order to lend a patina of decency to the whole affair. (Other historians consider de Surville to have been Adelaîde's true father). She went on to marry Jean Frédéric Perregaux, the first president of the Banque de France which he helped to create under Napoleon. Their children each married into the military nobility of the Empire; Hortense to Auguste de Marmont the Duke de Raguse, with no children, and Alphonse, now the Count de Perregaux, to the daughter of Marshall Jacques MacDonald. Their children were to have no heirs of their own and so even the illegitimate line of Beaujon was ultimately extinguished, though as a last gasp, the brief marriage of Alphonse's son Edouard to the famous "Lady of the Camelias" (the inspiration for both "Camille" and "La Traviata" does lend a final bit of glamour to this genealogy.

== Founder of the Hôpital Beaujon ==
In 1784 Beaujon founded, on his grounds, the Hôpital Beaujon, originally intended for poor orphans, becoming a general hospital during the Revolution, in 1795, and which continues in operation today (although removed to the Parisian suburb of Clichy in 1935).

== Family and legacy ==
Beaujon died in Paris in late 1786 of a hemiplegia (semiparalysis probably brought on by a stroke) and was honoured with a huge funeral pomp culminating with the deposition of his remains in a magnificent tomb in the chapel of St. Nicholas of Roule, which had been founded by him and built by his architect Girardin. During the French Revolution, his tomb was desecrated and his remains dispersed. His immense fortune was left to his wife's niece Charlotte Bontemps Duchess de La Châtre and Marchioness de Jaucourt of whom descendants exist today (though they are of course not descendants of Beaujon himself).
