= Barbotan-les-Thermes =

Coordinates: 43.949883°N 0.044203°W

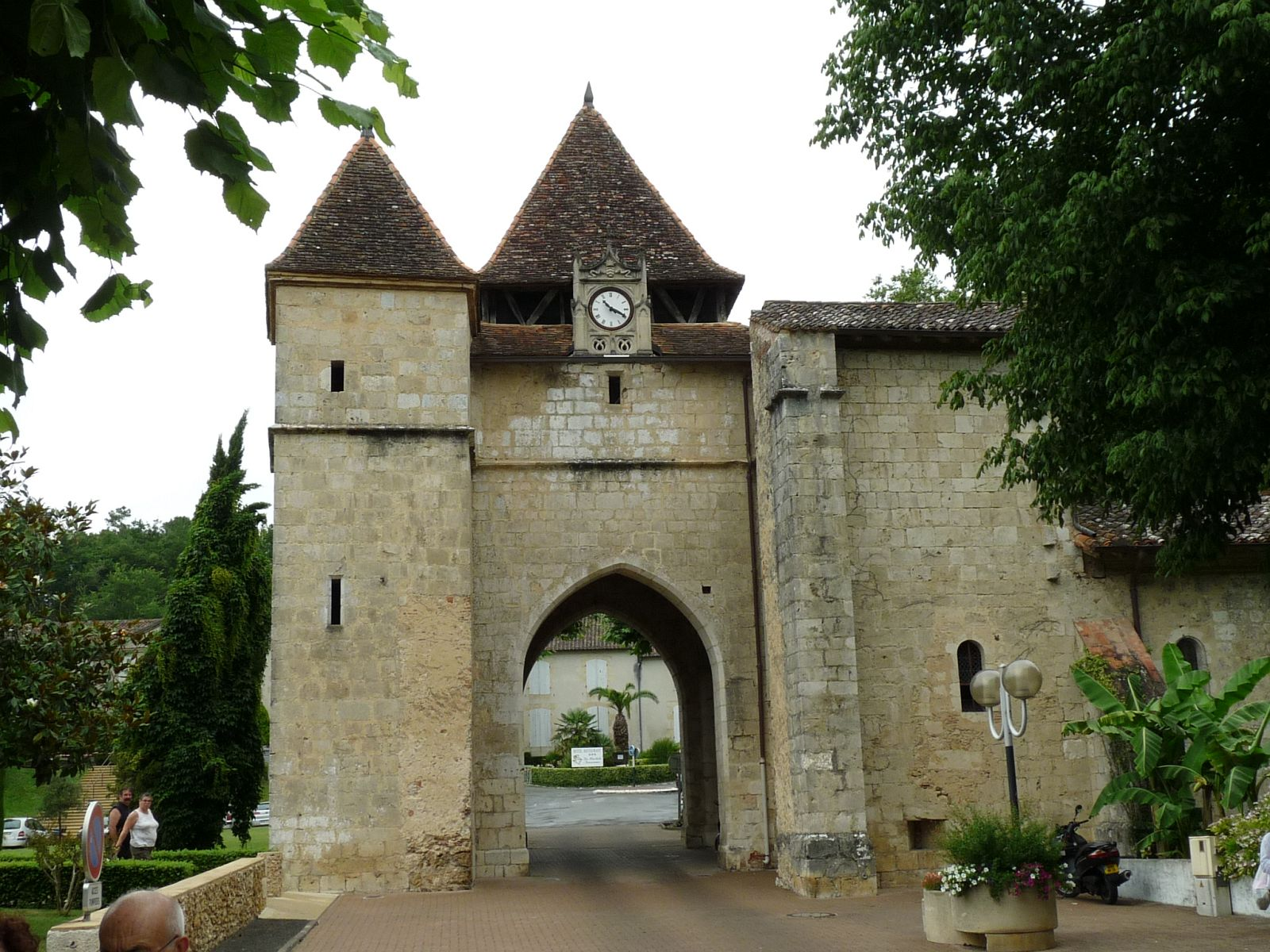
The gate and church of Saint-Pierre

Barbotan-les-Thermes is a spa in the Gers department of south-western France. Barbotan forms part of the commune of Cazaubon, and the town of Cazaubon is some 2 km (1.2 mi) to the south-west.

Barbotan lies on the Route nationale 524 (N524). It is approximately 70 km (43 mi) north-west of Auch, 120 km (75 mi) south-east of Bordeaux, 148 km (92 mi) west of Toulouse, and 700 km (430 mi) from Paris.

The N524 forms part of the Itinéraire à Grand Gabarit, a route which has been modified to allow its use by the oversize road convoys conveying body sections and wings of the Airbus A380 airliner, and several upgrades were made to the road through Barbotan to this end.
