= Captieux =

- Commune
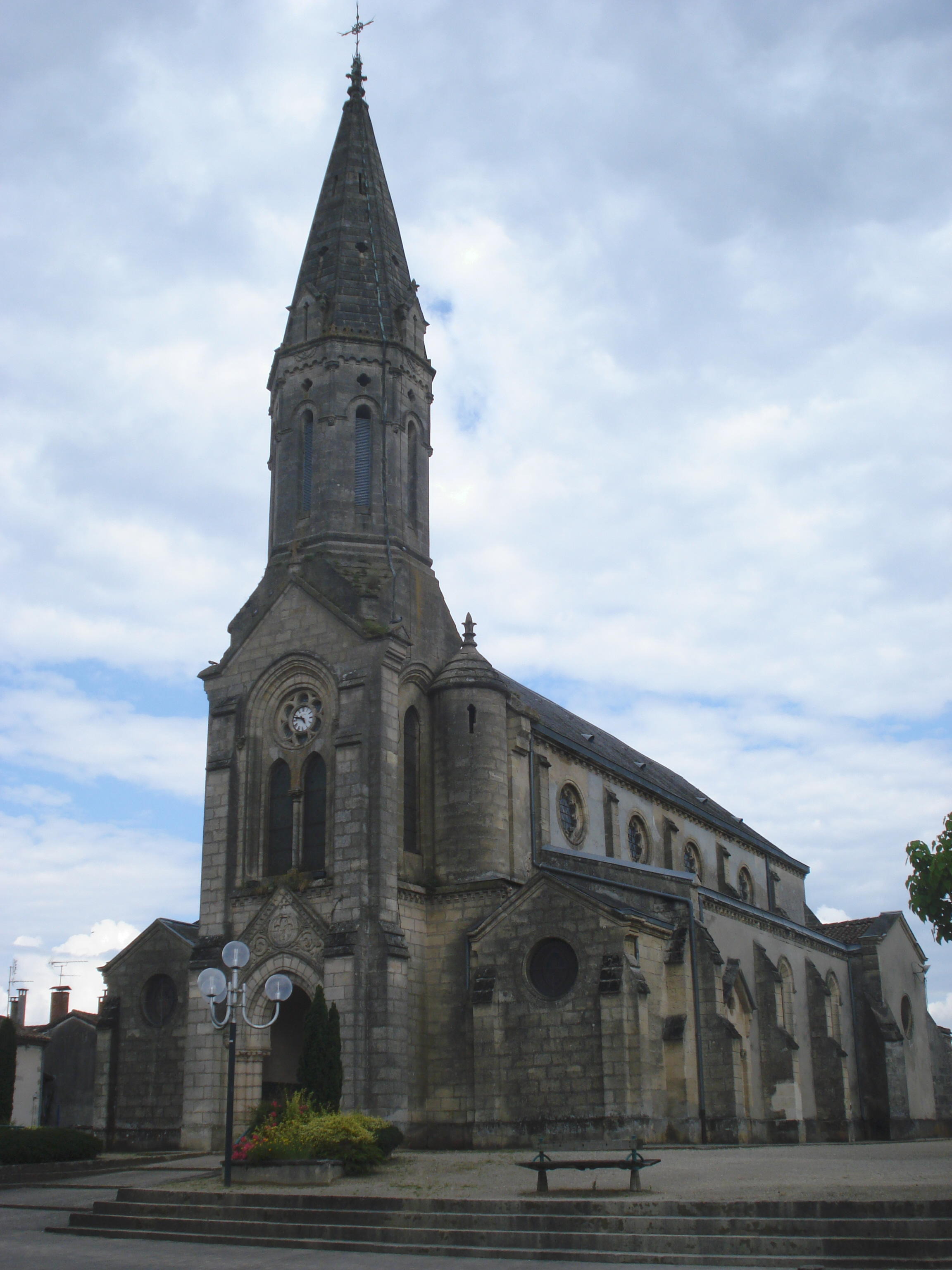
- The church in Captieux

- Coat of arms
- Location of Captieux
- Location within France Location within Nouvelle-Aquitaine
- Coordinates: 44°17′34″N 0°15′32″W
- Country: France
- Region: Nouvelle-Aquitaine
- Department: Gironde
- Arrondissement: Langon
- Canton: Le Sud-Gironde
- Intercommunality: Bazadais

Government
  - Mayor (2020–2026): Christine Luquedey
- Area^{1}: 119.33 km^{2} (46.07 sq mi)
- Highest elevation: 136 m (446 ft)
- Lowest elevation: 69 m (226 ft)
- Population (2023): 1,429
  - Density: 11.98/km^{2} (31.02/sq mi)
- Time zone: UTC+01:00 (CET)
  - Summer (DST): UTC+02:00 (CEST)
- INSEE/Postal code: 33095 /33840
- ^{1} French Land Register data, which excludes lakes, ponds, glaciers > 1 km^{2} (0.386 sq mi or 247 acres) and river estuaries.

Captieux (French pronunciation: [kapsjø]; Occitan: Capsiuts) is a commune of Southwestern France, located in the Gironde department, Nouvelle-Aquitaine (before 2015: Aquitaine).

It lies near the border with the Landes and Lot-et-Garonne departments.

The commune is in the east of the Parc naturel régional des Landes de Gascogne.

Between 1950 and 1967, the U.S. Army's 23,000-acre 571st Ordnance Ammunition Command (Captieux Ordnance Depot) was situated southwest of the village.

The Itinéraire à Grand Gabarit, a route which has been modified to allow its use by the oversize road convoys conveying body sections and wings of the Airbus A380 airliner, bypasses Captieux using a specially created private track about 1 kilometre (0.62 mi) to the east of the village.

== Population ==
Historical population
Year	Pop.	±% p.a.
1968	1,646	—
1975	1,669	+0.20%
1982	1,742	+0.61%
1990	1,707	−0.25%
1999	1,503	−1.40%
2007	1,399	−0.89%
2012	1,334	−0.95%
2017	1,281	−0.81%
2023	1,429	+1.84%
Source: INSEE

== See also ==
- Communes of the Gironde department
