= Jean Sentuary =

French civil servant

Jean Sentuary was a French civil servant who was governor of the island of Bourbon (now known as La Réunion) in the southwest Indian Ocean in the mid 18th century. He at first served as its procurer general, then became governor of the colony between 7 September 1763 and 14 October 1763, succeeding Jean-Baptiste Charles Bouvet de Lozier. He was also the father of three notable figures - Marie-Catherine Sentuary, Michelle de Bonneuil and Françoise-Augustine Duval d'Eprémesnil.
