= Vieillevigne =

Vieillevigne may refer to the following places in France:

- Vieillevigne, Haute-Garonne, a commune in the Haute-Garonne department
- Vieillevigne, Loire-Atlantique, a commune in the Loire-Atlantique department
