= Château de Vieillevigne =

Castle and stately home in Occitania, France

Coordinates: 43°24′16″N 1°39′26″E

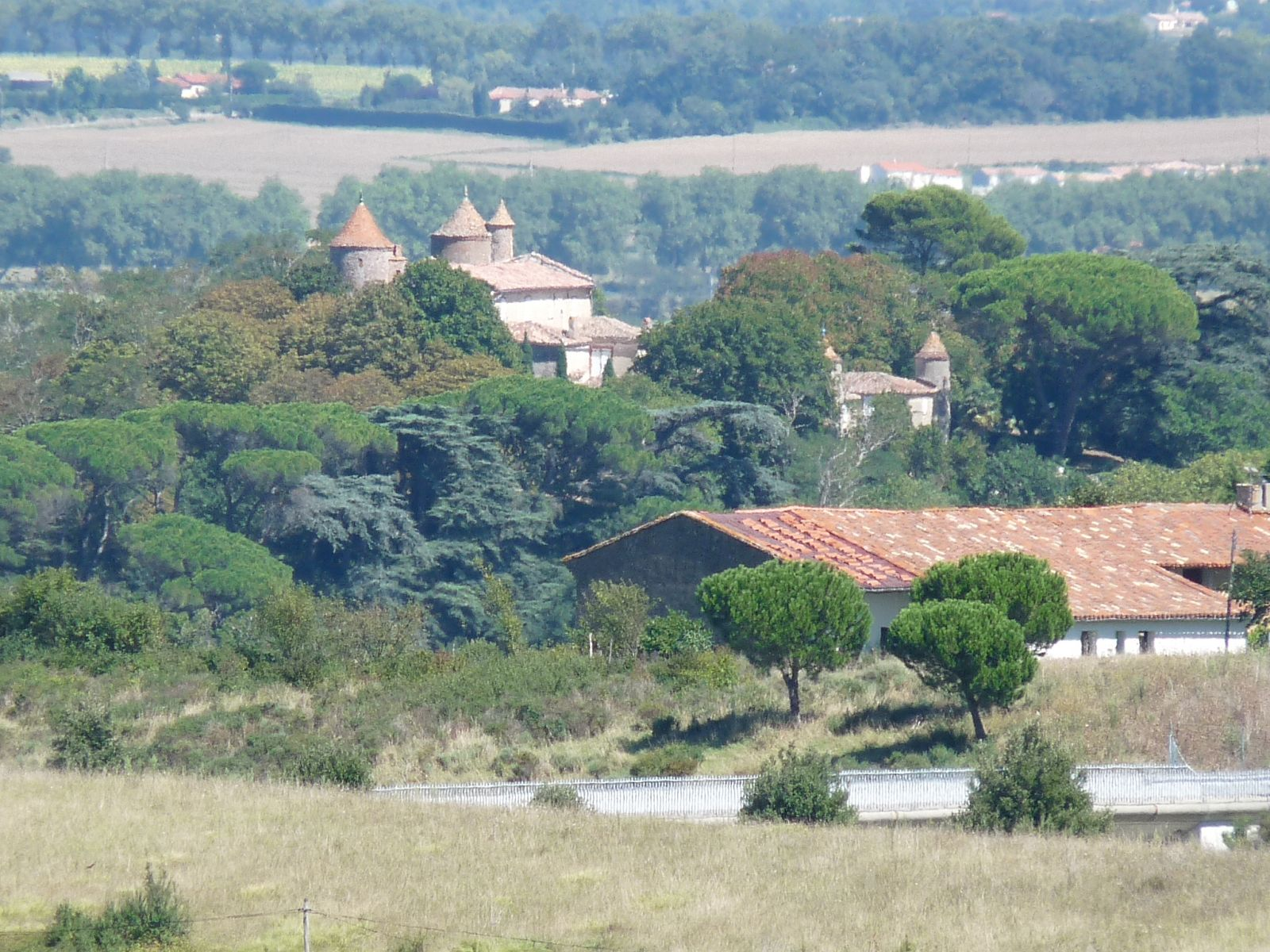
Château de Vieillevigne

The Château de Vieillevigne is a castle and stately home in the commune of Vieillevigne in the Haute-Garonne département of France. Originally built in the 16th century, it was transformed in the 17th, 18th and 19th centuries.

The 16th-century castle was redeveloped and enlarged in the 17th and 18th centuries. Surrounded by a countryside park in the 19th century, it consists of a residence flanked on the north by two circular corner towers, and on the south by two square pavilions hugging a terrace. Two low wings border a courtyard which was closed off with the construction of a fourth building in 1824. Inside is a grand 17th-century staircase and elements of the original 18th-century decoration. Privately owned, it has been listed since 2001 as a monument historique by the French Ministry of Culture.

== See also ==
- List of castles in France
