= Vieillevigne, Haute-Garonne =

Vieillevigne
- Commune
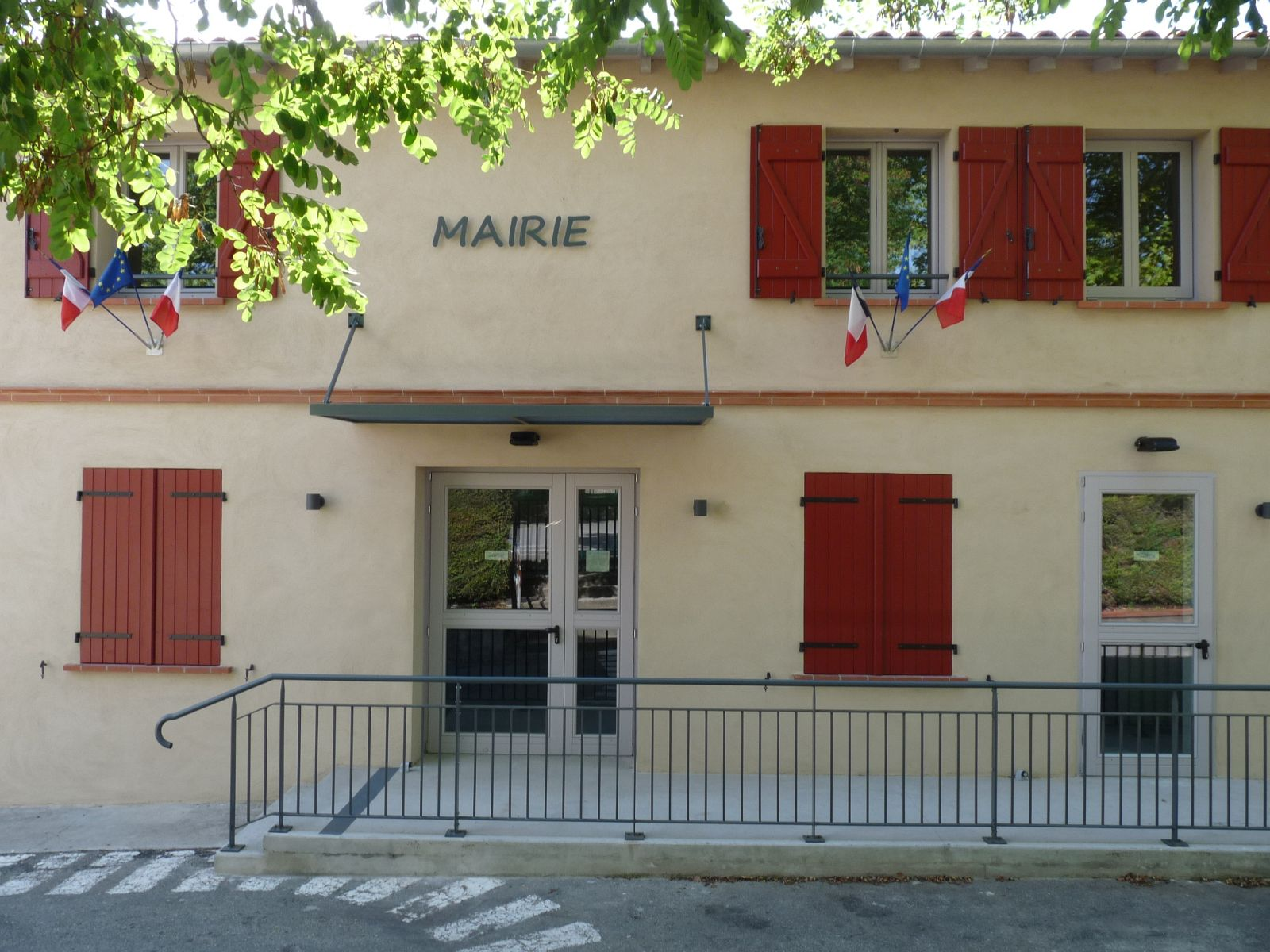
- The town hall in Vieillevigne

- Coat of arms
- Location of Vieillevigne
- Location within France Location within Occitanie
- Coordinates: 43°24′09″N 1°39′23″E
- Country: France
- Region: Occitania
- Department: Haute-Garonne
- Arrondissement: Toulouse
- Canton: Revel

Government
  - Mayor (2020–2026): Laurent Miquel
- Area^{1}: 3.14 km^{2} (1.21 sq mi)
- Elevation: 169 m (554 ft)
- Highest elevation: 247 m (810 ft)
- Lowest elevation: 164 m (538 ft)
- Population (2023): 344
  - Density: 110/km^{2} (284/sq mi)
- Time zone: UTC+01:00 (CET)
  - Summer (DST): UTC+02:00 (CEST)
- INSEE/Postal code: 31576 /31290
- ^{1} French Land Register data, which excludes lakes, ponds, glaciers > 1 km^{2} (0.386 sq mi or 247 acres) and river estuaries.

Vieillevigne (French pronunciation: [vjɛjviɲ]; Occitan: Vièlhavinha) is a commune in the Haute-Garonne department in southwestern France.

== Population ==
Historical population
Year	Pop.	±% p.a.
1968	123	—
1975	111	−1.46%
1982	124	+1.59%
1990	153	+2.66%
1999	174	+1.44%
2007	287	+6.46%
2012	296	+0.62%
2017	339	+2.75%
2023	344	+0.24%
Source: INSEE

== Sights ==
The Château de Vieillevigne is a 16th-century castle which developed as a stately home and is listed as a historic site by the French Ministry of Culture.

== See also ==
- Communes of the Haute-Garonne department
