= Doumergue =

Doumergue may refer to:

- Émile Doumergue (1844–1937), French scholar of John Calvin
- François Doumergue (1858–1938), French naturalist
  - Doumergue's fringe-fingered lizard, a species of lizard in the family Lacertidae
  - Doumergue's skink, a species of skink in the family Scincidae
- Gaston Doumergue (1863–1937), French politician and President of France

== See also ==
- Domergue
