= Louis Sicard =

French ceramist, sculptor and writer

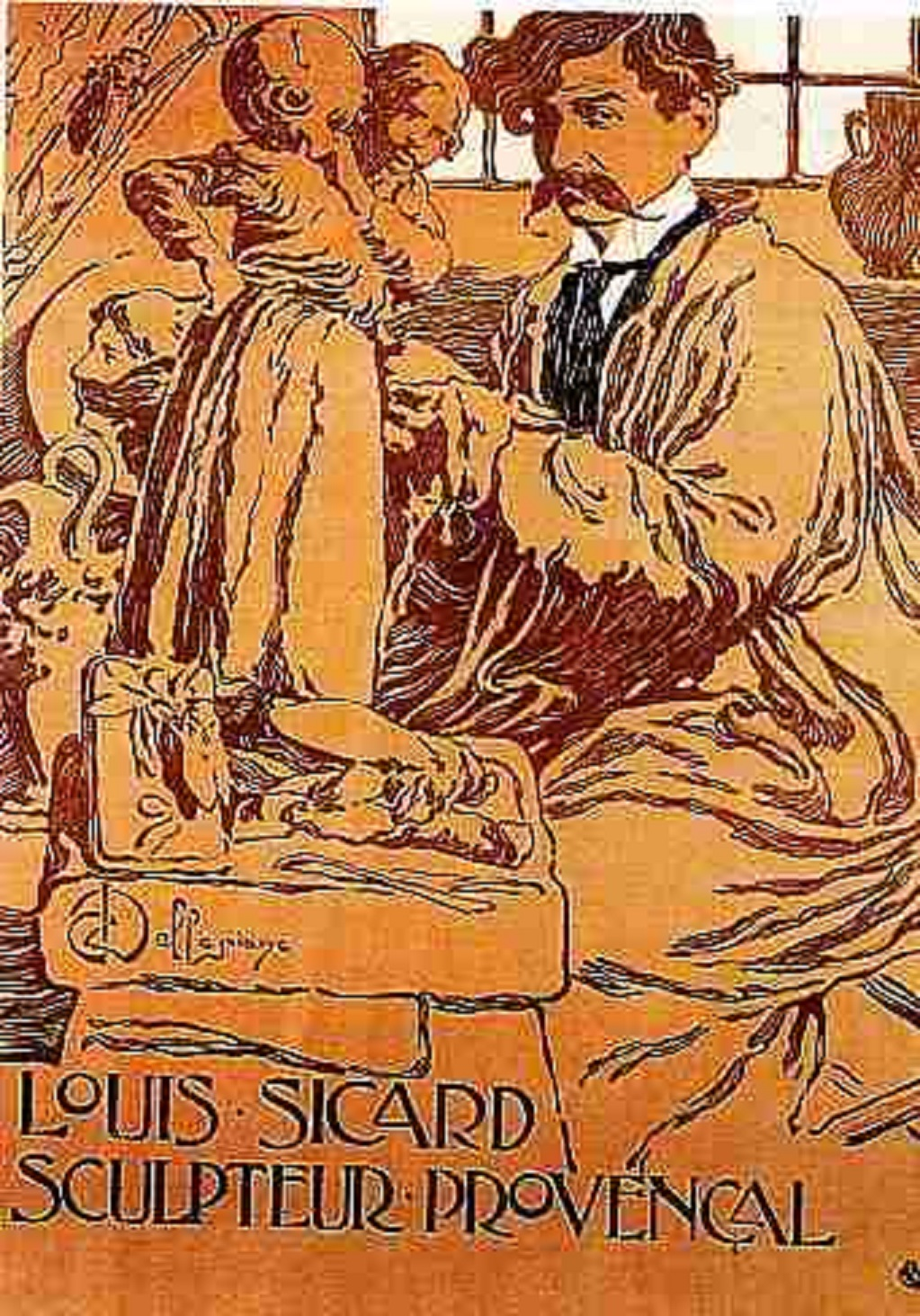
- Louis Sicard sculpteur provençal (1906), poster by David Dellepiane
- Born: January 21, 1871; Aubagne
- Died: June 28, 1946 (aged 75); Aubagne
- Known for: Ceramist, sculptor, writer, and teacher at the École de Beaux-arts in Marséille
- Movement: Félibrige

Louis Sicard was a French ceramist, sculptor and writer, born in Aubagne on January 21, 1871, and died in the same town on June 26, 1946.

A member of the Félibréen movement, he is famous for having created the first earthenware cicada in 1895. He is renowned for his technical knowledge of kiln operation and clay preparation. For many years, he taught modeling and throwing at the Aubagne boys' school (1901–1943) and at the École des Beaux-Arts in Marseille (1924–1943). On several occasions, he lost lawsuits brought against his competitors to protect his cicada models. His two sons, Georges (1904–1989) and Théo (1911–1970) took over his studio on his death. His sister, Thérèse Neveu, was a renowned Provencal santon-maker.

== The beginnings ==
Louis Marius Sicard was born on January 21, 1871, in Aubagne, in the workshop of his father, Léon Sicard (1826-circa 1900), who spent most of his working life as a crucible maker. Louis Sicard learned to wheel in 1883, using his father's ceramic techniques. He quickly made a name for himself as a talented turner. In 1891, while working at the Magnat workshop in Menton, Queen Victoria came to visit. In his excitement, Louis Sicard is said to have accidentally squirted a drop of barbotine into the Queen's eye. She didn't hold it against him, however, and gave him 20 francs to thank him for his demonstration, leaving him "more dead than alive". Depending on the version, the potter or a comrade would then have remarked: "At twenty francs an eye, if you had plugged them both, they would have given you forty francs".

== Consolidation ==
=== A technician ===
Louis Sicard's professional background gave him in-depth knowledge of kiln operation: in 1897, he won first prize in the Société des Architectes de Marseille competition for his model of a large circular kiln with an inverted flame. In 1912, he was commissioned to study the Dieulefit clay deposits and investigate the causes of the area's inferior ceramic production. He perfected a clay mix that produced more refractory, less porous pottery, and developed a lead-free glaze to replace alquifoux, a lead sulfide dangerous to workers and consumers alike.

=== A multi-talented artist ===
In 1898, Louis Sicard received a small grant of 100 francs from the commune of Aubagne to attend evening classes with Émile Aldebert at the École des Beaux-Arts in Marseille. There, he studied modeling and sculpture, acquiring great skill. By the end of his training, Louis Sicard had already produced several subjects inspired by the Italian Renaissance, as well as a number of commissioned portraits of regional socialites and national figures. The poet Elzéar Rougier described his working methods while the ceramist was working for Atelier Aubert in Aubagne: "Louis Sicard then showed me his clay portraits, which were one of his specialties. He seemed to improvise his medallions and busts; if need be, he would take his pack of clay, the "pâte créatrice", to the models themselves, requiring only three or four brief sessions of patience, good grace and, above all, naturalness. Then, in his studio, he created a work of art that was life itself. And, precisely, I am looking with pleasure at the aristocratic bust of a young lady with a slender collar, delicate, fleshy shoulders, her hair done in a flamingo style, following the latest whim of fashion, which has so many pretty ones; the eyes speak, the mouth speaks, the cheeks are like blossoming flowers; the clay in the complexion becomes feminine flesh...".

It is as a sculptor that Louis Sicard is represented by David Dellepiane on a poster produced for an exhibition he staged in 1906. Françoise-Albane Beudon notes of this poster: "Louis Sicard is captured in the clutter of his studio, modeling a water carrier with his fingers. On the wall, some of the pieces he excelled at: tambourines, cicadas and medallions. Captured in the fever of creation, his face is powerfully rendered, with the apple of his eye as black as his lavaliere".

Louis Sicard's talents led him to be commissioned, around 1895–1898, to produce a six-by-eight-meter clay and plaster model of the city of Marseille under Louis XIV, and in the early 1910s another model or bas-relief depicting a stretch of the Marseilles coastline including the Lazarettoo.

On his own, the ceramic artist also developed his writing and acting skills. Noted for his storytelling talents, he wrote regularly for the Marseilles Provençal newspaper La Sartan under various pseudonyms or under his real name (150 papers). On a wall in the Aubert workshop in Aubagne, where he worked as a freelancer in the early 1900s, Louis Sicard wrote a couplet that was noticed by Provençal historian, poet and playwright Elzéar Rougier:

L'argiélo es dins lei man de l'ome
Ce que l'ome es dins lei man de Dieù (in Occitan).

The clay is in Man's hands
Man is in God's hands.

=== A well-known personality ===
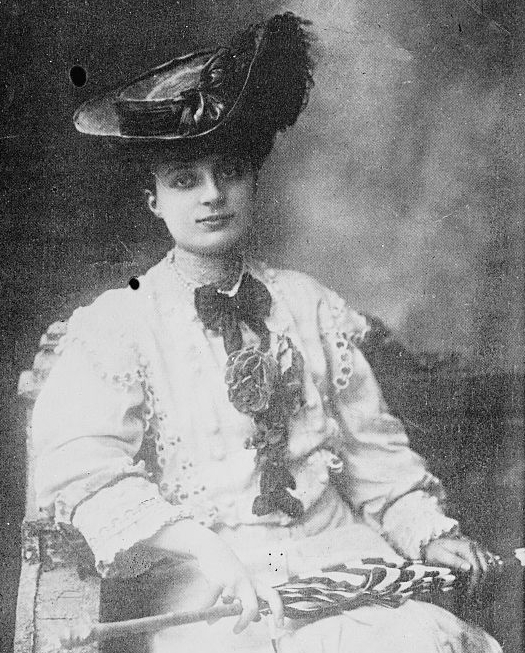
Anna de Noailles.

The Provençal ceramist taught modeling and throwing from 1901 to 1943 at the Aubagne boys' school. In 1929, the Comité départemental de l'Enseignement technique (Departmental Committee for Technical Education) recognized these courses as compulsory for young people at the school to learn the ceramics craft. From 1924 to 1943, he was appointed to teach ceramics at the École des Beaux-Arts in Marseille.

His technical and artistic knowledge, his contacts with the art world, his literary output, his membership of the Félibréen movement, the gifts he gave to and visits from celebrities all helped build and enhance his reputation. He knew the actor Raimu – who bought him a table set – the playwright Edmond Rostand, the Provençal historian Marcel Provence, the inventor and patron Dominique Piazza... He received in his studio the prefect and later minister Abraham Schrameck, Jean Jaurès to whom he gave two objects with cicadas in 1909, and also President Gaston Doumergue. In 1926, he received a visit from the Countess Anna Mathieu de Noailles, who is said to have gratified him with "Monsieur, you have spring in your hands" as she watched him turn an amphora with plant motifs.

== Workshops, ceramic production and technical processes ==
=== From workshop to factory ===
After being hosted successively by Aubert until 1906 or 1910, by the Barielle brothers until 1914, and by Albert de la Poussardière from 1918, when he was demobilized, until 1922, Louis Sicard rented the factory from Charles Remuzat. He acquired the factory in 1926 and set up a Private limited company with his children. The family workshop, known as the "Usine", was located at no. 2 boulevard Émile-Combes (formerly rue du Rosier) in Aubagne. While Théo was responsible for the artistic side of the business, his brother Georges was in charge of press relations and bookkeeping. Other workers came on a more or less regular basis, depending on requirements and their specialties.

=== The manufacturing process ===
The production techniques used in the workshop were described by journalist Jean Bazal in a special issue of the November 1941 issue of Sciences et Voyages, who noted that the production process had not changed, and was able to observe the preparation of the paste obtained from red or white clay, Calcium carbonate, dolomite and silica. The resulting clay blocks were dried in plaster buckets, then pressed between large plaster disks, as this material absorbs moisture. The clay was then sent to the rotting kiln, where it acquired greater plasticity. It was then mixed with mallets – known as "pastage" – to make it homogeneous. The kiln, fueled by wood from the nearby garrigues, received the products for a first firing. Objects were then decorated by hand with metal oxides mixed with fluxes, then dipped in a bath of soft pink lead silicate varnish. A second firing at 1,000 °C sealed in the varnish, protecting the decoration. For mass-produced objects such as cicadas, Louis Sicard used the casting technique alongside stamping and turning.

=== Ceramic production ===
Production at Louis Sicard's workshop was extremely rich. (Note: Amouric (2012), pp. 102–150) In addition to earthenware portraits, santons were produced in high-fired tin-glazed earthenware, some of them designed by Thérèse Neveu, as well as promotional items such as objects featuring a cicada, a variation on the theme of Mirèio carrying a basket of figs offered by La Figatine liqueur to its concessionaires, and commemorative objects such as portraits of Tsar Nicholas II and his wife to mark the conclusion of the Franco-Russian alliance in 1892. The range of tableware was highly diverse: tea and coffee sets, gargoulettes, vegetable dishes, egg sets, vases, dishes and plates in a variety of shapes, saltcellars, candy dishes, ashtrays, paperweights, bookends, decorative amphoras, electric lamp bases, baskets, piggy banks, and more. Many pieces were produced in line with Art Nouveau themes. Painted decorations were very common: humorous, with fish, santons, flowers and landscapes. With the exception of dishes and plates, Louis Sicard's signature cicada was often depicted in the form of a sconce.

=== The cicada's tribulations ===
In 1895, while Louis Sicard was working in Siméon Aubert's workshop in Aubagne, the Société générale des Tuileries de Marseille or the Tuilerie de Berre indépendante, depending on the version, asked the young Aubagne-born artist to create a corporate gift symbolizing Provence, to be given to customers as a New Year's gift. Inspired by the Félibrige poets, for whom the cicada is an emblem, the artist designed an earthenware paperweight featuring a cicada resting on an olive branch. He signed it with the motto imagined by Frédéric Mistral: "Lou Souleù mi fa canta" (in Occitan) ("The Sun makes me sing"). The ceramist quickly developed the insect figure into a wide range of objects: cigale porte-bouquet, vase, plate, ashtray, marmite, bonbonnière with cicada, etc. From 1921 onwards, Louis Sicard filed several of his designs with the clerk's office of the Tribunal de Prud'Homme for registration. These registrations, which were filed much later than the invention of the motif, were cancelled each time. Lawsuits brought by the man of art throughout the 1920s against competitors who copied the motif always ended in his disfavor, despite clear evidence of copying. In Le Petit Provençal of October 30, 1923, the félibre Paul Ruat reported that Louis Sicard's articles could not meet demand and "were imitated by manufacturers in Vallauris, Saxony, Copenhagen and elsewhere. Naturally, the further away from Aubagne, the less accurate the likelihood of cicadas became. Today, there are few Provencal families, and few foreigners who have visited Provence, who don't have some earthenware cicada souvenir on their tableware." The cicada became a synonymous for Provence, despite a loss of interest from the 1960s until the late 1980s, when collectors began to take an interest; from then on, it became once again a characteristic model of kitsch bimbeloterie for tourists.

== Posterity ==
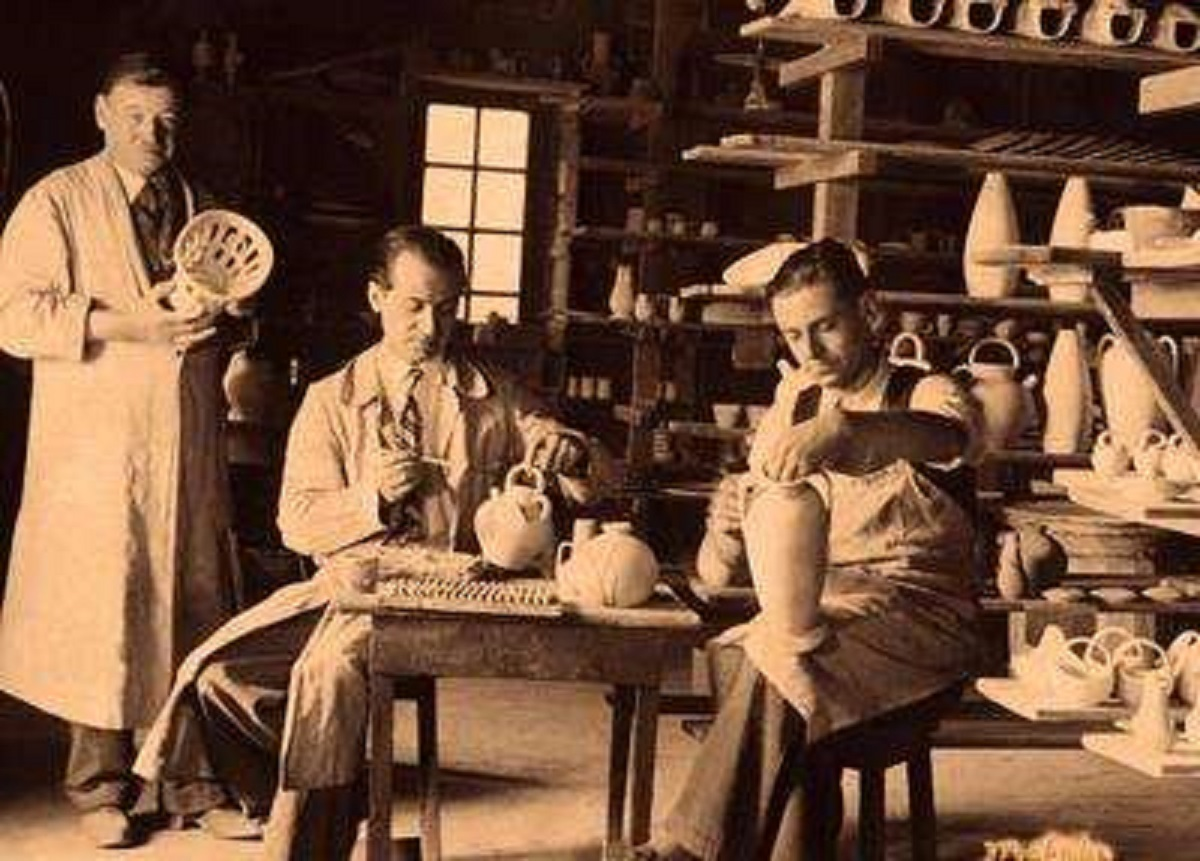
Louis Sicard with his two sons, Théo and Georges, at l'Usine, postcard from the 1930s.

During World War II, Louis Sicard suffered from left-sided hemiplegia, which made it difficult for him to practice his art. He died on June 28, 1946, shortly before his sister Thérèse Neveu, a renowned Provencal santon maker.

Théo (1911–1970), the youngest son, followed in his father's footsteps in the family workshop, which he took over on his death. He was a talented turner, a highly skilled technician and an excellent decorator. From 1943, he also took his father's place teaching at the École des Beaux-Arts in Marseille. Inspired by contemporary art, he added a modern touch to Sicard's work. His elder brother, Georges (1904–1989), was a man of letters and a theater enthusiast. However, he played an important role in the company's administrative and financial management. Christian (1930–1993), son of Georges and grandson of Louis, became a decorator at the Usine. His interest in design led him to develop personal products such as farandoles and cloisonné dishes, following in his uncle's footsteps.

After Théo's death, Georges Sicard decided in 1976 to hand over the factory to family friends Raymond and Sylvette Amy, who continued Louis Sicard's productions. By the early 2000s, the workshop, still run by the Amy family, was well known across the Atlantic for its production of clay santons and cicadas.

Nearly 900 works produced by the Sicard workshop between 1895 and 1972 were presented at an exhibition, Un Été de Faïence : l'atelier Sicard 1895–1972, held in Aubagne from July 6 to September 9, 2012. An exhibition catalog was published for the occasion.

== See also ==
- Kitsch
- Ceramic
- Aubagne
