= Domergue =

Domergue is a French surname. Notable people with the surname include:

- Faith Domergue (1924–1999), American film actress
- François-Urbain Domergue (1745–1810), French grammarian and journalist
- Jacques Domergue (born 1953), French politician
- Jean-François Domergue (born 1957), French footballer
- Jean-Gabriel Domergue (1889–1962), French artist
- Marcel Domergue (1901–1969), French footballer
- Robert Domergue (1921–2014), French footballer

== See also ==
- Doumergue
