= Garlaban =

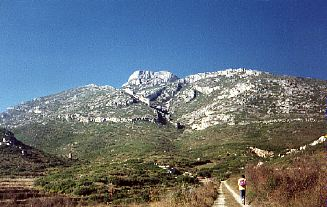

Highest point
- Elevation: 715 m (2,346 ft)
- Coordinates: 43°19′53″N 5°33′13″E

Geography
- Location within France
- Location: Bouches-du-Rhône, France

Garlaban (French pronunciation: [ɡaʁlabɑ̃]) is a mountain which looks out to Aubagne. The summit is 715 metres high although its highest point is the butte des pinsots (731 m).

It can be seen from most of the southern part of Bouches-du-Rhône, from Marseille to the valley of Huveaune, through to the motorway in Toulon and the one in Aix-en-Provence. In the past, seamen from Marseille used to look to it to find direction.

== Cultural references ==
- It is perhaps best known thanks to Marcel Pagnol, who referred to it in My Father's Glory and My Mother's Castle.
