= La Royante =

Coordinates: 43°18′05″N 5°32′58″E

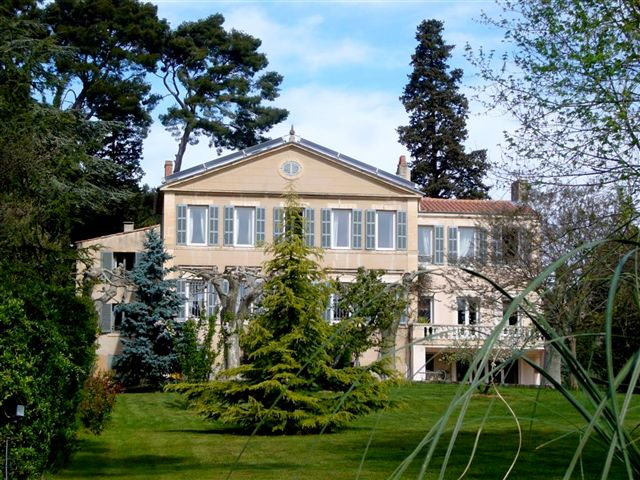
La Royante in Aubagne en Provence

La Royante is a bastide (country manor) located in the town of Aubagne in Provence, between Cassis and Aix-en-Provence on the south side of Garlaban mountain. It displays typical 18th-century Provençal architecture including a remarkable Gothic chapel. Mentioned on old maps as "the castle of the bishop", the property currently hosts a guesthouse. It was the center of historical research for Heritage Days in 2011.

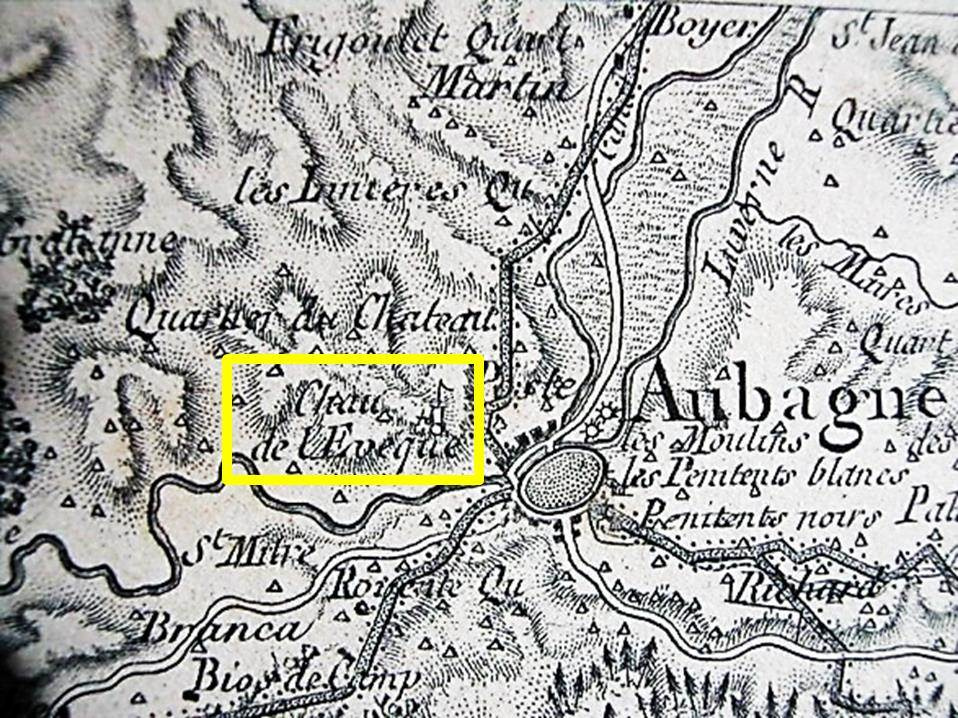
Map of the 18th-century Aubagne mentioning the "castle of the bishop" around La Royante

== The neo-Gothic chapel ==
Directly accessible from within the main building, the chapel is embedded in a perpendicular wing. The nave shows two bays with ribbed vaults, supported by Corithian pillars. Each bay is decorated with two statues of the evangelists of both sides.

The choir area ends on a canted apse and is lit by five colorful stained glass windows Saint Thomas, Virgin Mary, Saint Dominic, Saint Joseph and Saint Francis of Assisi. Its altar is topped with a small dais, surrounded by two scenes: on the left, a haloed lamb, symbolizing the Jesus Christ, lies on a promontory from which a spring sours and where two deer - the faithful - are drinking; right, two doves drinking from the same cup, symbolizing sweetness and Christian virtues.

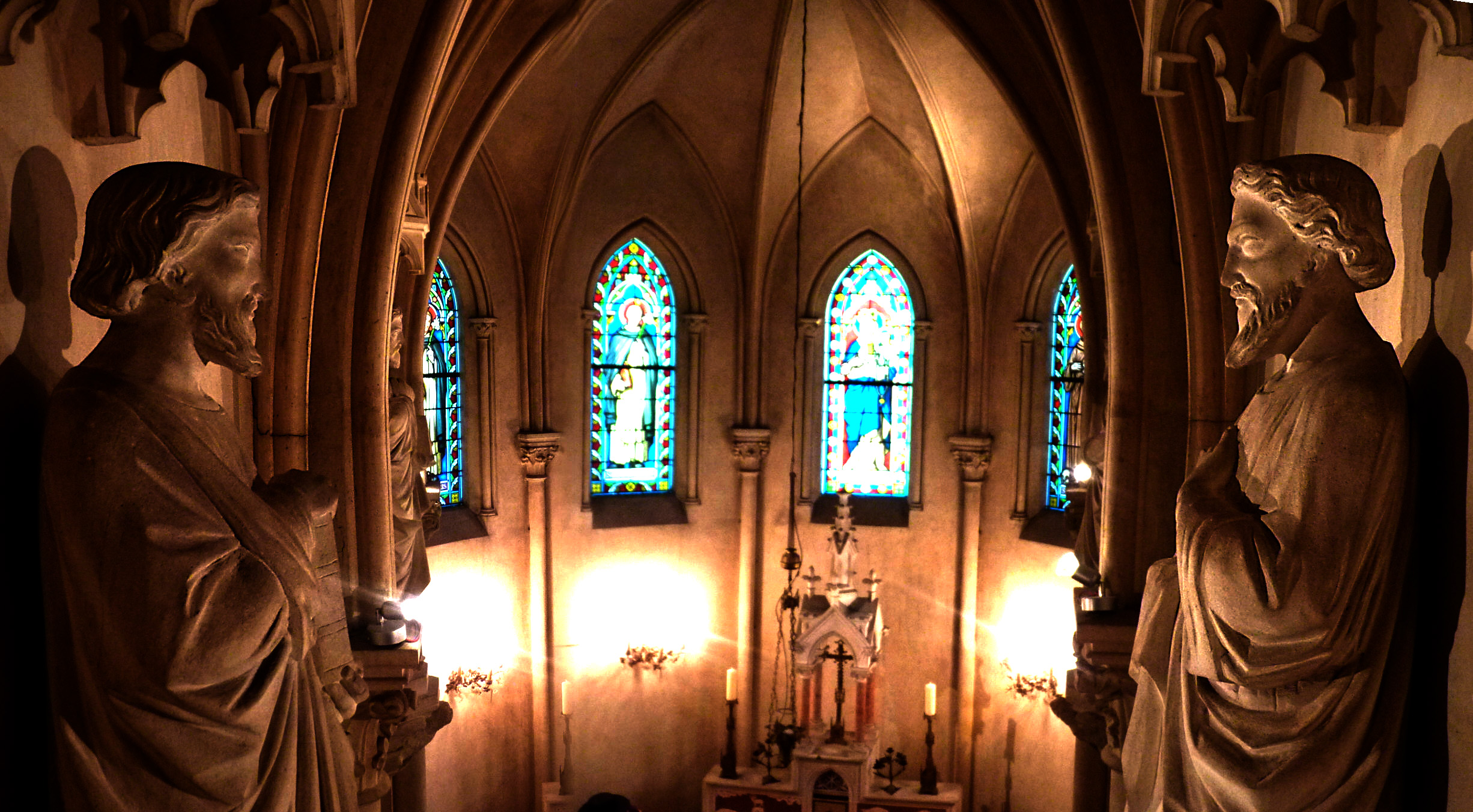
Inside view of the chapel

In front of the altar, the pavement is decorated with neo-Romanesque pattern, and bears the inscription "Pavete Sanctuarium meum ad", i.e. : "Be fearful at the approach of my sanctuary" Just above, a winged dragon twists inside three circles. The initials of the couple at the origin of the chapel, Fortuné and Thomasine Broquier are drawn on each side of the altar.

Fortuné Broquier, a lawyer in Marseille, close to senior officials of the Crown, acquired the property in 1857. He is also shown at the bottom of a pillar in the back of the chapel.

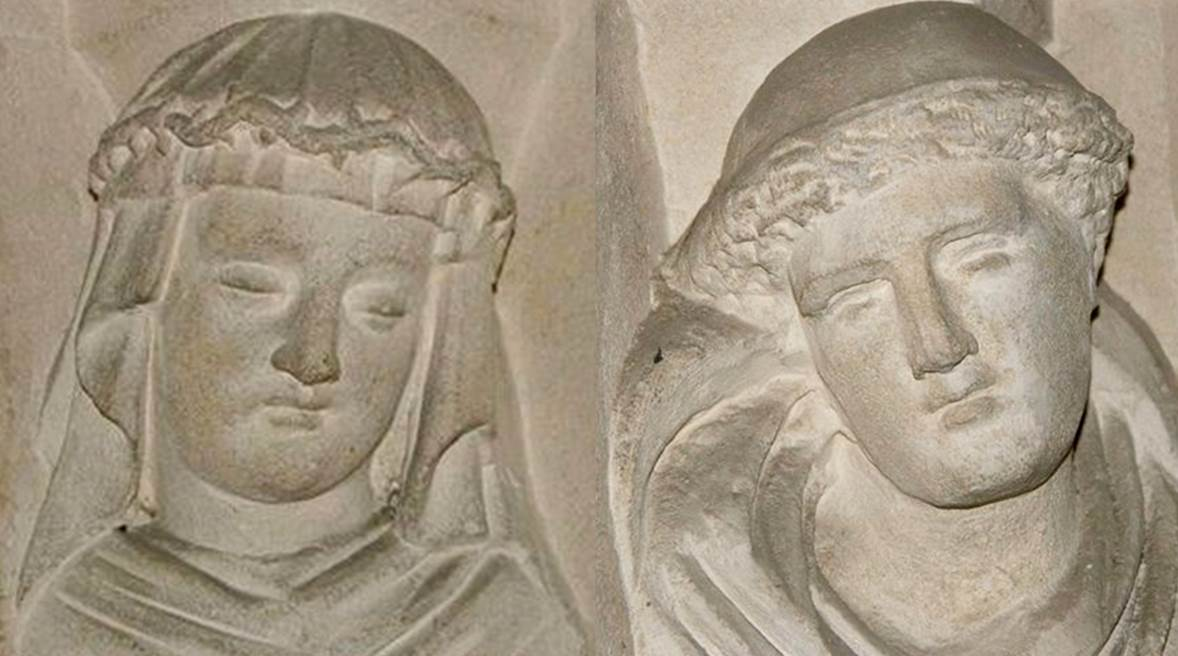
Thomasine and Fortuné Broquier

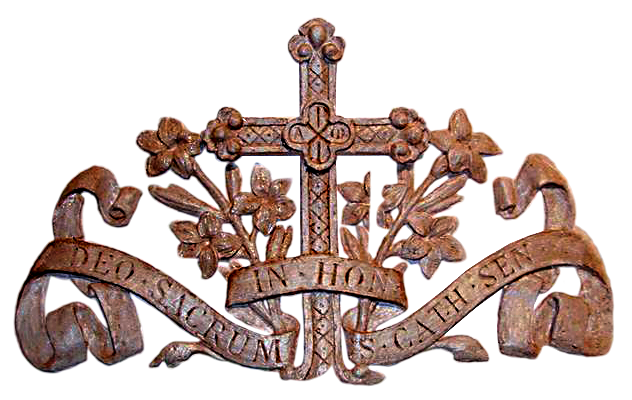
Dedication to saint Catherine of Sienna

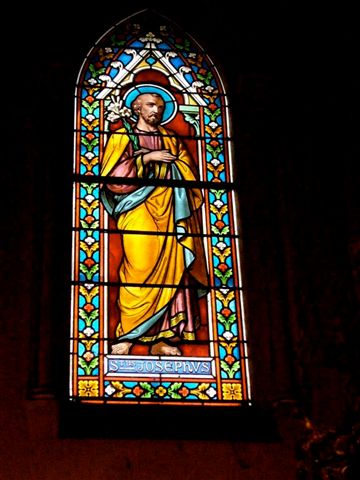
Saint Joseph stained glass window

The location being 30 minutes away from the main town church Fortuné Broquier proposed to Church authorities to build a chapel so that he and his guests can benefit from the celebration of masses. Pope Pius IX himself gave his blessing to the Broquier couple, revealing the influence of the family. The pope sent them three letters between 1874 and 1877: they detail the organization of masses, indicate what furniture to adopt and mention the possibility of hosting Dominicans. Fortuné Broquier was closely tied to this monastic order - which also guide the dedication of the chapel to Saint Catherine of Siena, as recalled on a plaster cast

Masses held at La Royante experienced a real success with the locals, so much so that religious authorities worried and pope Pius IX had to reiterate his support for the Broquier family in a third and last letter. These three letters were used to date the building of the chapel in the early 1870s. The dating is confirmed by the striking stylistic kinship between certain elements of the chapel and the church of Saint-Barthélemy in Marseille, built in 1872 by Gaullier on a design by up by Verdier and Condamin. The two buildings share very similar altar iconography, similar single nave, apse and ribbed vault, and finally a colored cement pavement.

== Modern times ==
The property is currently operated as a guesthouse.
