= Aubagne =

Commune in Provence-Alpes-Côte d'Azur, France

Aubagne Aubanha (Occitan)
- Commune
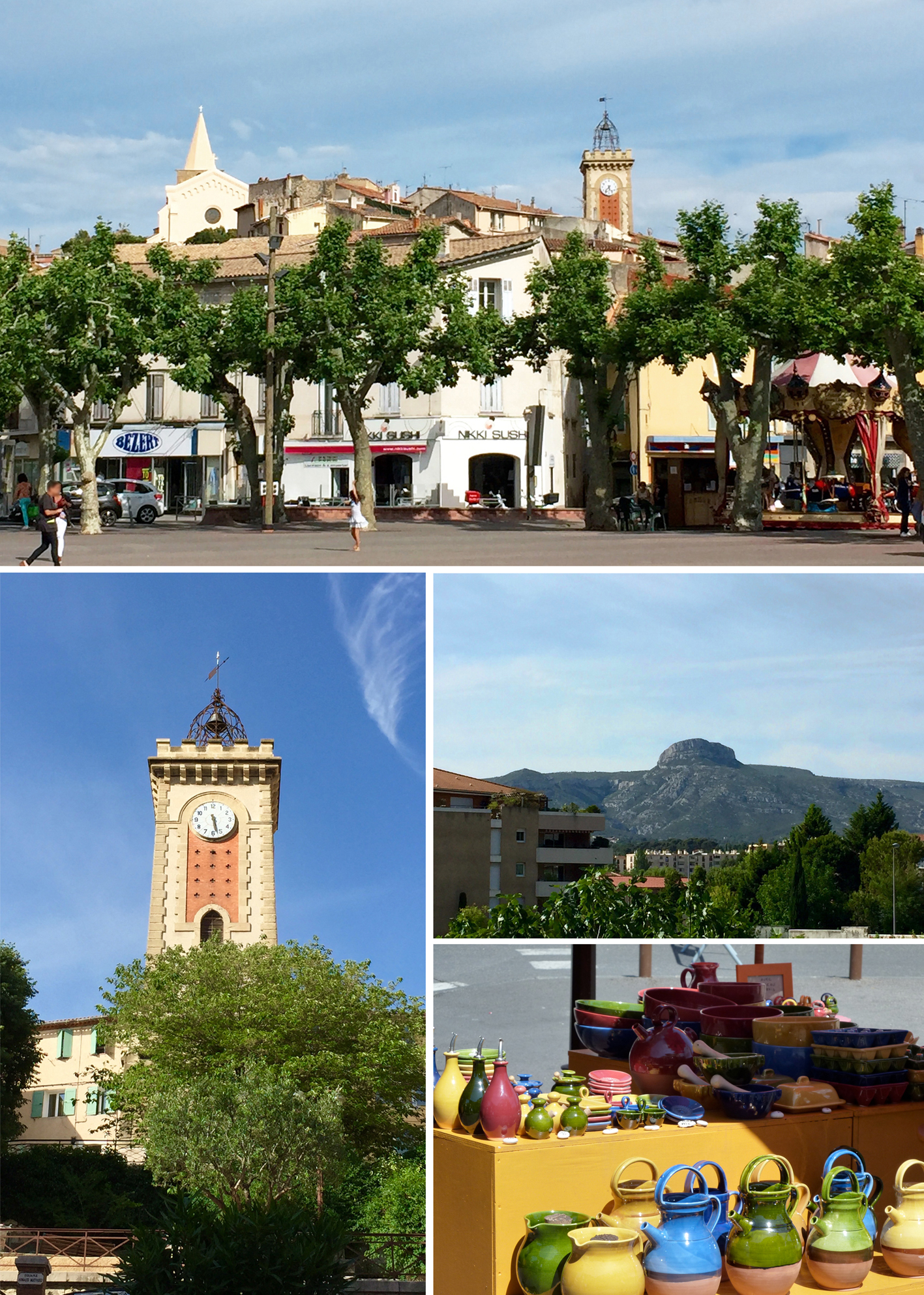
- Clockwise from top: city centre, Garlaban hill, Aubagne Market, Tour de l'Horloge

- Coat of arms
- Location of Aubagne
- Location within France Location within Provence-Alpes-Côte d'Azur
- Coordinates: 43°17′27″N 5°34′15″E
- Country: France
- Region: Provence-Alpes-Côte d'Azur
- Department: Bouches-du-Rhône
- Arrondissement: Marseille
- Canton: Aubagne
- Intercommunality: Aix-Marseille-Provence

Government
  - Mayor (2026–32): Jean-Pierre Squillari
- Area^{1}: 54.9 km^{2} (21.2 sq mi)
- Elevation: 101 m (331 ft)
- Highest elevation: 701 m (2,300 ft)
- Lowest elevation: 74 m (243 ft)
- Population (2023): 47,529
  - Density: 866/km^{2} (2,240/sq mi)
- Time zone: UTC+01:00 (CET)
  - Summer (DST): UTC+02:00 (CEST)
- INSEE/Postal code: 13005 /13400
- Dialling codes: 0442
- ^{1} French Land Register data, which excludes lakes, ponds, glaciers > 1 km^{2} (0.386 sq mi or 247 acres) and river estuaries.

Aubagne (French: [obaɲ]; Occitan: Aubanha according to the classic norm or Aubagno according to the Mistralian norm) is a commune in the department of Bouches-du-Rhône, southern France.

== Geography ==
Aubagne is located in the Huveaune Valley and surrounded by the mountain ranges of Garlaban with Sainte-Baume to the north and 17 km (11 mi) east of Marseille. Aubagne was the main city of the former Agglomeration community of Pays d'Aubagne et de l'Étoile; it has been part of the Aix-Marseille-Provence Metropolis since 2016. It is the sixth largest city of Bouches-du-Rhône by population.

It is the main producer of Santon figurines and also hosts many cultural events each year. The Foreign Legion has its headquarters in Aubagne. Public transport has been free at the point of use since the year 2000.

Access to the commune is by the A50 autoroute from Marseille which continues south to Toulon. The A501 and A52 autoroutes branch off the A50 in the commune and merge to go north to Aix-en-Provence. Numerous departmental roads go through the commune including: the D96 which goes north to Roquevaire, the D2 which goes east to Gémenos, the D8N which comes from Marseilles and goes south-east to Cuges-les-Pins, the D41E which goes south to Cassis, and many other connecting roads within the commune. There are several smaller towns and villages in the commune apart from the main town: Les Arnauds, Les Grands Mellets, Pinchon, La Martelle, L'Agrie, La Coueste, La Thuiliere, and Font de Mai. A large proportion of the commune is urban with mountainous terrain to north and south

The main railway from Marseille passes through the commune splitting into two lines - one going north-west and one going south with a station in the town.

The river Huveaune flows through the commune from the east flowing west into the Mediterranean Sea at Prado beach in the 8th Arrondissement in Marseille.

=== Climate ===
Climate data for Aubagne (1981-2010)
Month	Jan	Feb	Mar	Apr	May	Jun	Jul	Aug	Sep	Oct	Nov	Dec	Year
Mean daily maximum °C (°F)	12.9 (55.2)	14.0 (57.2)	17.0 (62.6)	19.2 (66.6)	24.1 (75.4)	28.1 (82.6)	31.1 (88.0)	31.0 (87.8)	26.0 (78.8)	21.5 (70.7)	16.1 (61.0)	13.0 (55.4)	21.2 (70.1)
Daily mean °C (°F)	7.4 (45.3)	8.1 (46.6)	10.7 (51.3)	13.0 (55.4)	17.4 (63.3)	21.1 (70.0)	23.8 (74.8)	23.8 (74.8)	19.6 (67.3)	16.0 (60.8)	10.8 (51.4)	7.9 (46.2)	15.0 (58.9)
Mean daily minimum °C (°F)	1.9 (35.4)	2.2 (36.0)	4.4 (39.9)	6.8 (44.2)	10.7 (51.3)	14.0 (57.2)	16.5 (61.7)	16.6 (61.9)	13.1 (55.6)	10.4 (50.7)	5.6 (42.1)	2.8 (37.0)	8.7 (47.8)
Average precipitation mm (inches)	66.8 (2.63)	35.3 (1.39)	30.5 (1.20)	58.5 (2.30)	41.9 (1.65)	27.3 (1.07)	8.5 (0.33)	20.9 (0.82)	81.6 (3.21)	91.4 (3.60)	73.7 (2.90)	64.5 (2.54)	600.9 (23.64)
Average precipitation days (≥ 1 mm)	5.4	4.2	3.9	6.9	4.4	3.3	1.3	2.1	4.9	6.7	7.2	5.7	56
Source: Infoclimat

== Transport ==
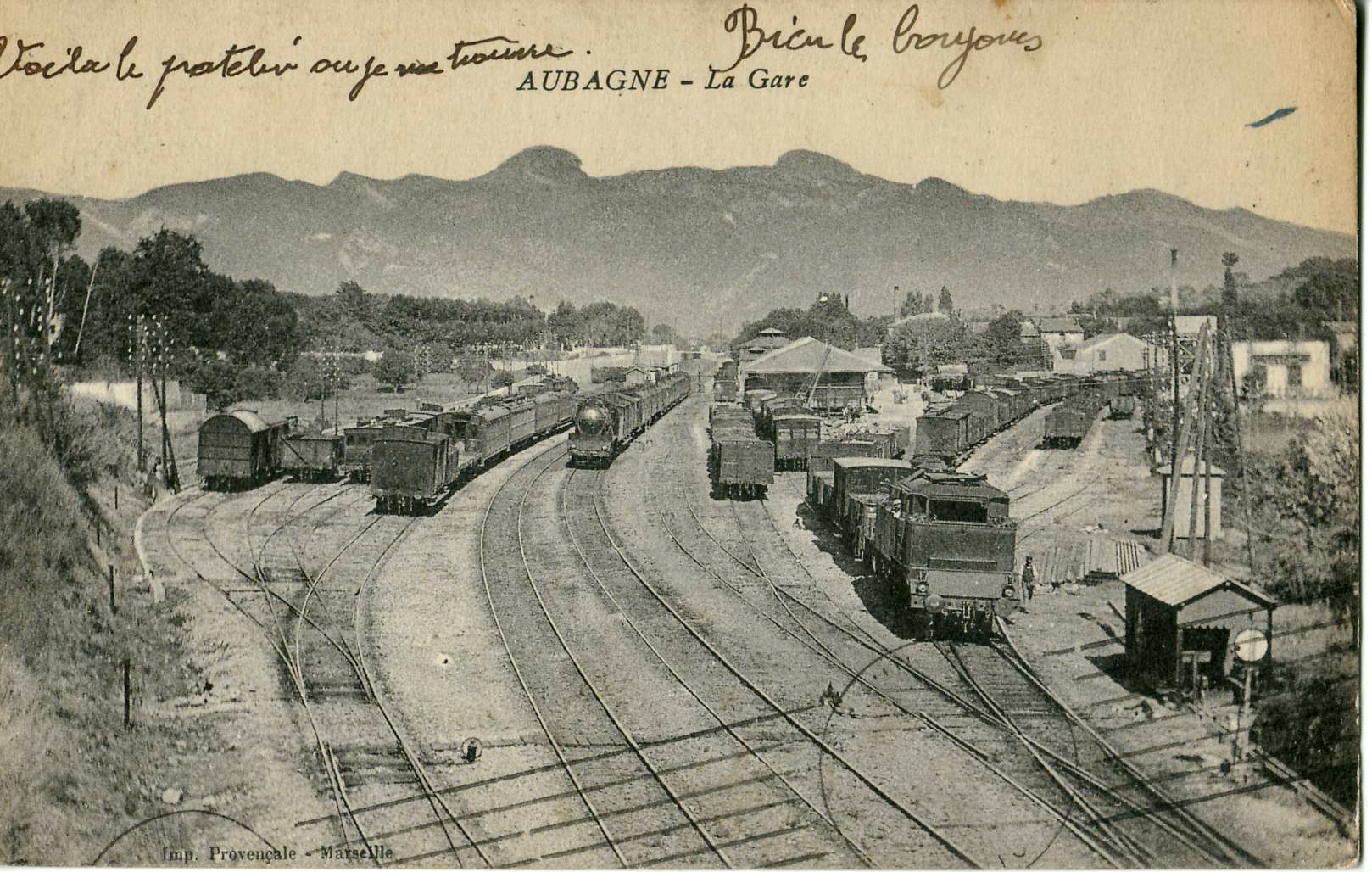
Aubagne station before 1916

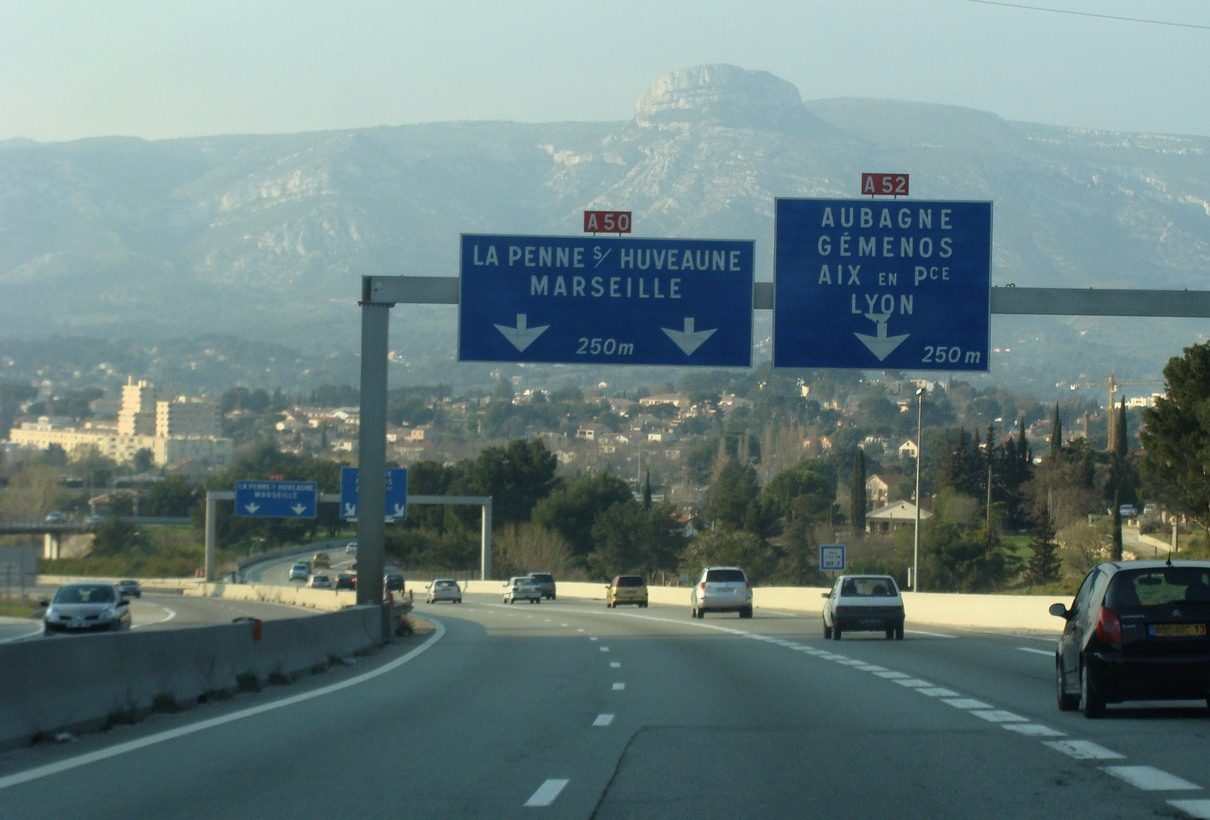
The A50-A52 junction in Aubagne

Aubagne was the first commune in France to be completely surrounded by autoroutes: the A50 autoroute Marseille-Toulon, the A52 autoroute to Aubagne-Aix-en-Provence, and the connecting motorway A501.

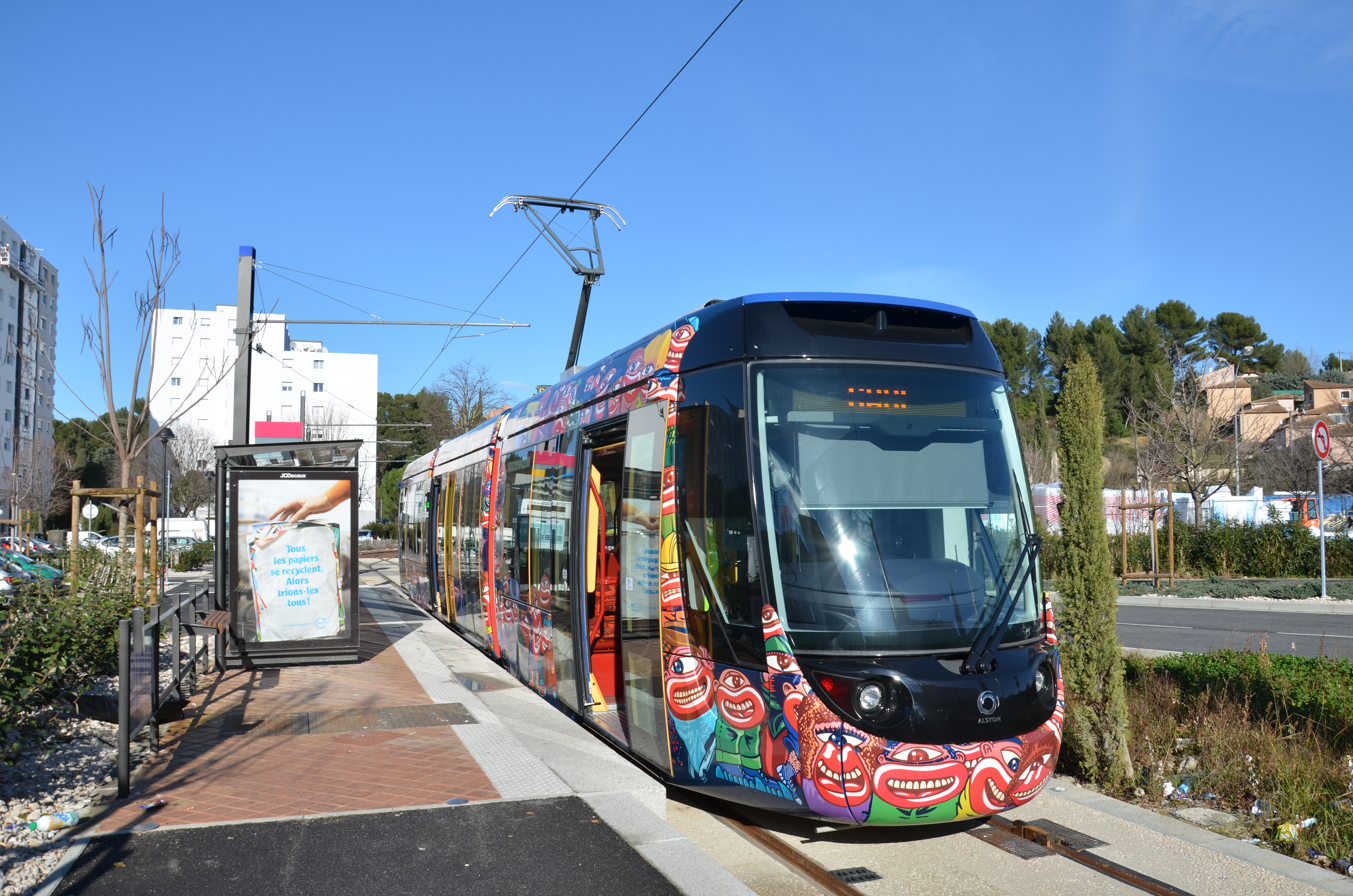
A tram at the railway station

Regional TER trains operated call at the Gare d'Aubagne railway station, linking the city with Marseille and Toulon. Local public transport in the city, operated under the Lignes de l'agglo brand, is provided by a network of buses and, since 2014, a single 2.8-kilometre (1.7-mile) tram line with seven stops between the railway station and Le Charrel. This project has been criticized, as it is not common for a city of its size. Construction started in 2012 and the first phase opened on 1 September 2014, with service provided by eight Alstom Citadis Compact trams. An eastern extension of this line to Les Paluds, as well as a second line to La Penne-sur-Huveaune in the west, has been planned, with a long-term project to link the network to the Marseille tramway.

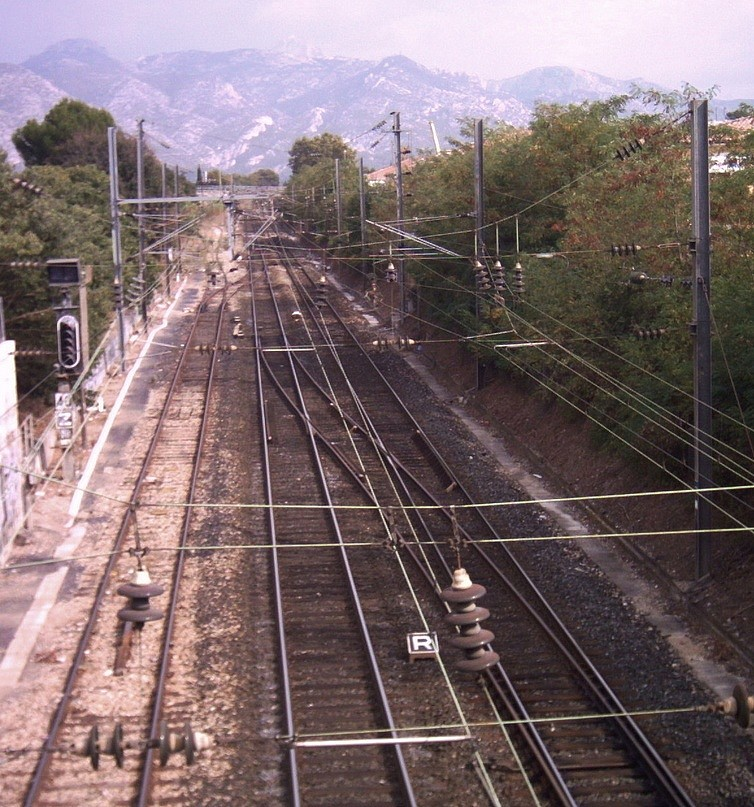
Aubagne railway station

In 2009, Aubagne made bus travel zero-fare, a scheme which was subsequently extended to the tramway following its opening. This makes the Aubagne tramway the first in the world to be completely free for all users (the Tallinn network, by contrast, is only free for city residents).

== History ==
=== Toponymy ===
The name Aubagne derives from the Latin phrase ad bainea, meaning 'at the baths'.

=== The Middle Ages ===
The death of Queen Joanna I of Naples began a conflict of succession as to who would become the head of the County of Provence. The Union of Aix, a confederation of cities in the region of Provence, supported Charles, Duke of Durazzo, rather than Louis I, Duke of Anjou. By the spring of 1382 the Lord of Aubagne, François des Baux, supported the Duke of Anjou. This support was conditional upon the Duke helping to restore the queen to her throne.

On 4 April 1402 in Brantes, at the foot of Mont Ventoux, and in the presence of his wife Alix des Baux, Odon de Villars bestowed upon his nephew Philippe de Lévis the fiefs of Brantes, Plaisians and their dependencies: the Lordships of Saint-Marcel, Roquefort, le Castellet, Cassis, and Port-Miou which were dependencies of the barony of Aubagne, as well as La Fare-les-Oliviers, and Éguilles. In return, Philippe de Lévis would be surety for Viscount Raymond VIII of Turenne for the agreement between Odon de Villars, his wife Alix, and himself. If Odon and Alix failed to respect the terms of the agreement, they would have to pay 50,000 florins to the viscount.

=== Heraldry ===
Arms of Aubagne	Blazon: Azure, a Roman letter A of Or interlaced with a letter V the same, in chief 2 fleur-de-lis the same, in base a sea of Argent.

== Politics and administration ==
=== Political life ===
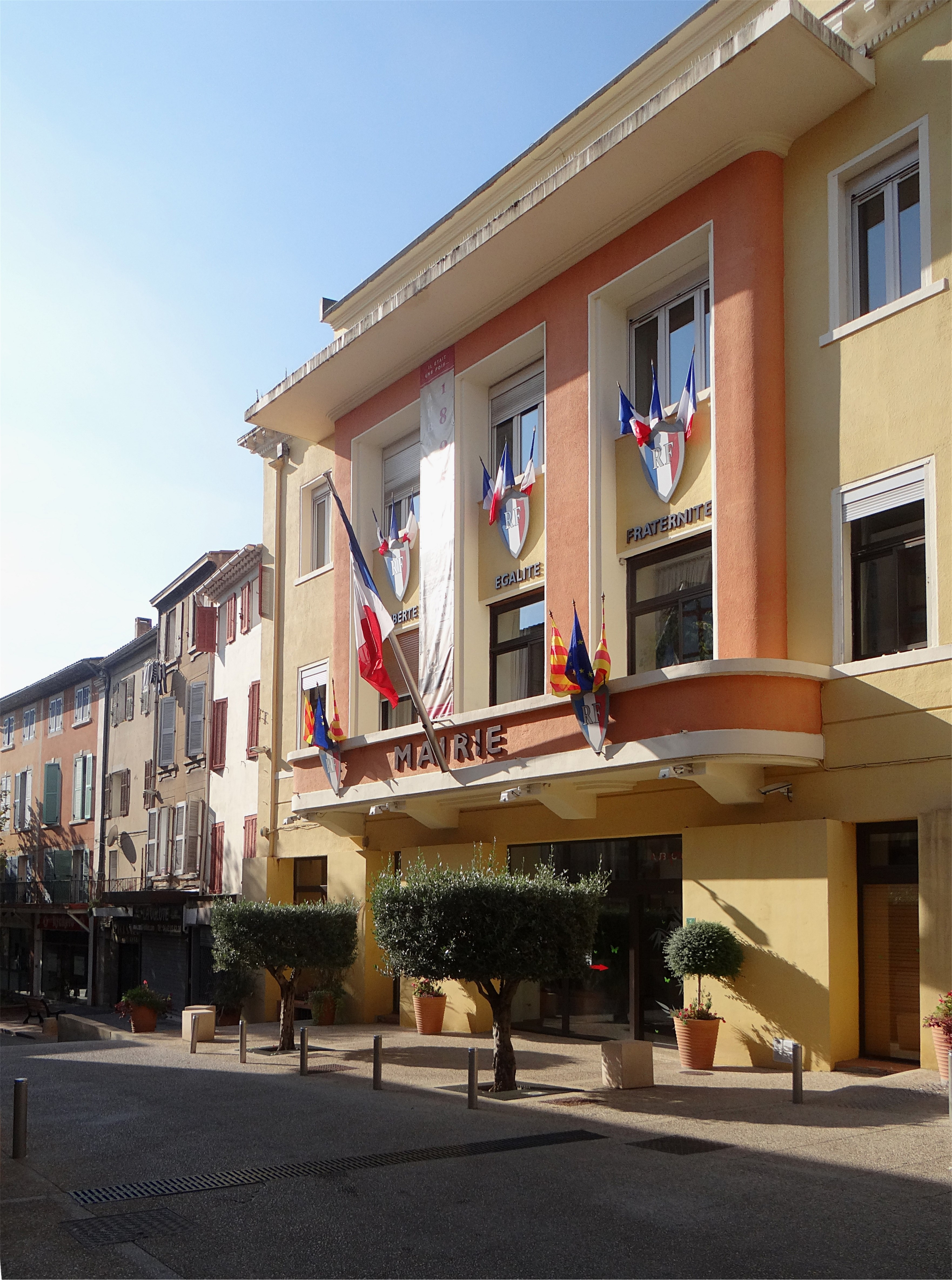
The Hôtel de Ville

Between 1965 and 2014, Aubagne has elected three Communist mayors: the municipal council is composed mainly of communist, socialist, and other left-leaning members. Still, a significant portion of the population supports centre, right-of-centre, or even far-right political positions. In the second round of elections in 1988, both a representative of the French Communist Party (Parti communiste), Jean Tardito, and a representative of the far-right National Front party (Front National), Joëlle Melin, were elected. Edmond Garcin, of the Communist party, was elected mayor from 1965 to 1987.

In 2001, the resignation of Jean Tardito brought Daniel Fontaine (PCF) to the position of mayor. In 2008 there were 4 candidates in the first round of municipal elections: Daniel Fontaine for The United Left and a civil society, Sylvia Barthelemy for the UMP and the New Centre, Jean-Marie Orihuel for the Democratic Movement, and Joëlle Melin for the National Front. In the second round the United Left, the Civil Society, and the Democratic Movement joined together to form the Left Union list which was renamed the "rainbow". In 2014, the mayorship shifted as Gérard Gazay (UMP) was elected to the position of mayor after an alliance with Sylvia Barthelemy during the second round.

The Hôtel de Ville was established in a house on Rue Saint-Matthieu in 1828.

=== List of mayors ===
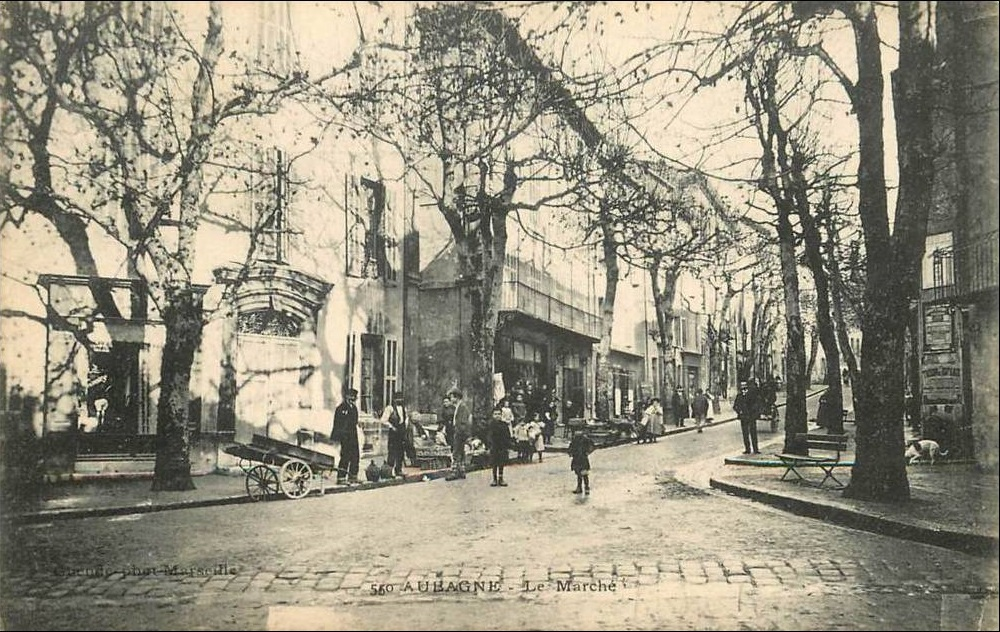
The market at Aubagne in the early 1900s

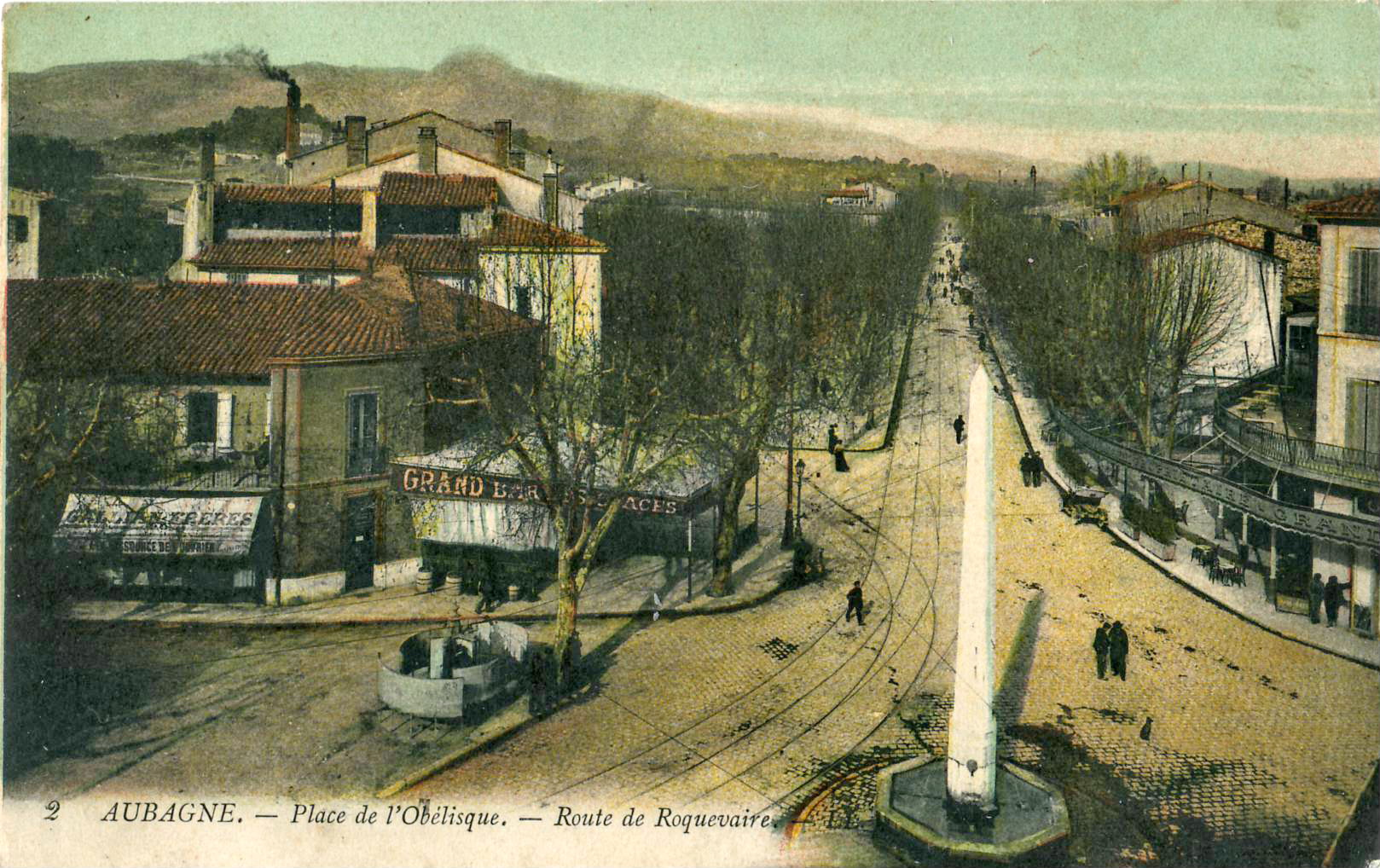
Place de l'Obelisque in 1914

List of successive mayors

From	To	Name	Party
1792	1793	Jean Baptiste Domergue	
1831	1843	Félix Beaumond	
1870	1871	Jean Louis Henri Dieudonné Celly	
1906		Fernand Bouisson	
1919	1925	Etienne Marius Florent Boyer	
1933	1942	Marius Boyer	
1945	1951	Mario Cresp	
1951	1953	André Jayne	
1953	1959	Marius Boyer	
1959	1965	Yves Chouquet	
1965	1987	Edmond Garcin	PCF
1987	2001	Jean Tardito	PCF
2001	2014	Daniel Fontaine	PCF
2014	2026	Gérard Gazay	LR
2026	incumbent	Jean-Pierre Squillari	

== Environment and related policies ==
Agenda 21 sets the terms and conditions for sustainable development in Aubagne which includes providing free public transit, offering a recycling program, encouraging energy conservation and energy demand management, launching awareness campaigns in schools to promote sustainable development and eco-citizenship, and giving incentives for purchasing solar panels. More than 4,000 individual bins and 15,000 recycling bags are available to residents.

The city of Aubagne conducts its environmental, social, and economic policies in collaboration with neighbouring communities to help enhance sustainable development and improve living conditions.

Communal transport: Since 15 May 2009 municipal buses have been free and the Tramway of Aubagne will also be when it opens in 2014. This has reduced the commune's transportation-related ecological footprint: 15% more buses have been put into service, and bus usage has increased by 175%, with 35% of these users from modal shift.

Compiègne and Châteauroux have done the same but with goals that are more socioeconomic: making the centre of town more dynamic, improving buying power, reducing isolation, etc.

In 2020, the commune was awarded three flowers by the National Council of Towns and Villages in Bloom in the Competition of cities and villages in Bloom.

== Population ==
Its inhabitants are known as Aubagnais or Aubagnaises in French.

Historical population

Year	Pop.	±% p.a.
1793	7,230	—
1800	5,610	−3.56%
1806	6,620	+2.80%
1821	6,122	−0.52%
1831	6,349	+0.36%
1836	6,481	+0.41%
1841	6,208	−0.86%
1846	6,131	−0.25%
1851	6,482	+1.12%
1856	6,765	+0.86%
1861	7,232	+1.34%
1866	7,408	+0.48%
1872	7,658	+0.55%
1876	8,027	+1.18%
1881	7,885	−0.36%
1886	8,239	+0.88%
1891	8,154	−0.21%
1896	8,400	+0.60%
1901	8,724	+0.76%

Year	Pop.	±% p.a.
1906	9,614	+1.96%
1911	9,744	+0.27%
1921	10,271	+0.53%
1926	11,707	+2.65%
1931	13,085	+2.25%
1936	13,949	+1.29%
1946	16,061	+1.42%
1954	17,639	+1.18%
1962	21,211	+2.33%
1968	27,938	+4.70%
1975	33,595	+2.67%
1982	38,561	+1.99%
1990	41,100	+0.80%
1999	42,638	+0.41%
2007	44,804	+0.62%
2012	45,243	+0.20%
2017	46,209	+0.42%
2023	47,529	+0.47%

Source: EHESS and INSEE (1968-2023)

== Economy ==
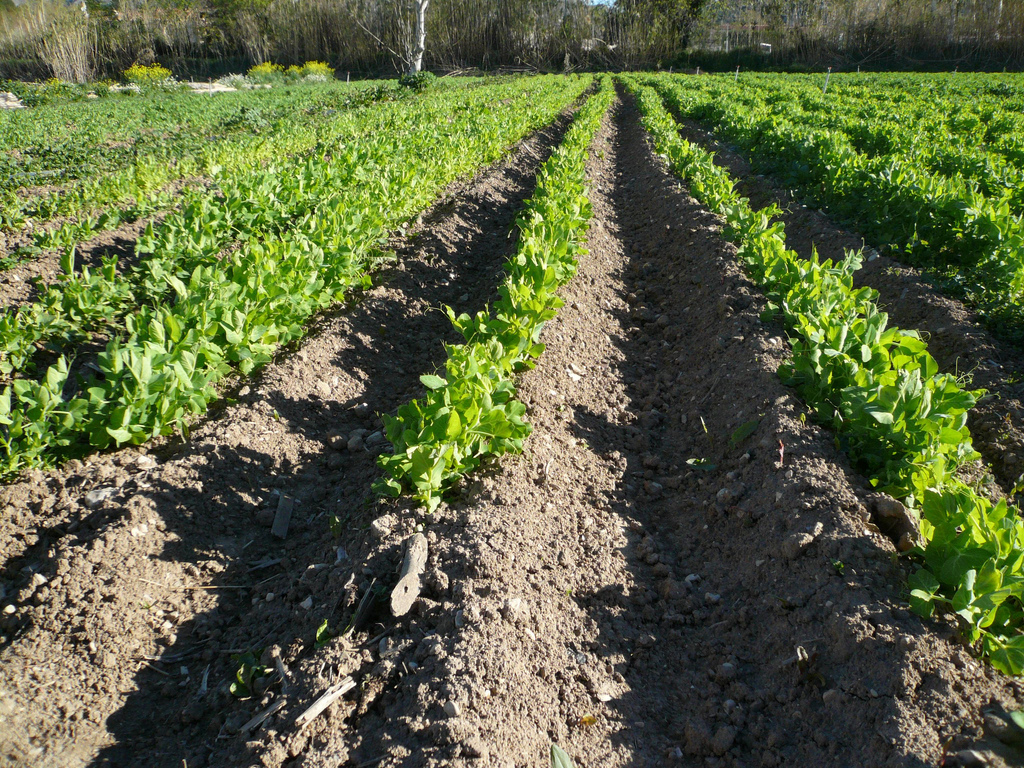
Field of peas

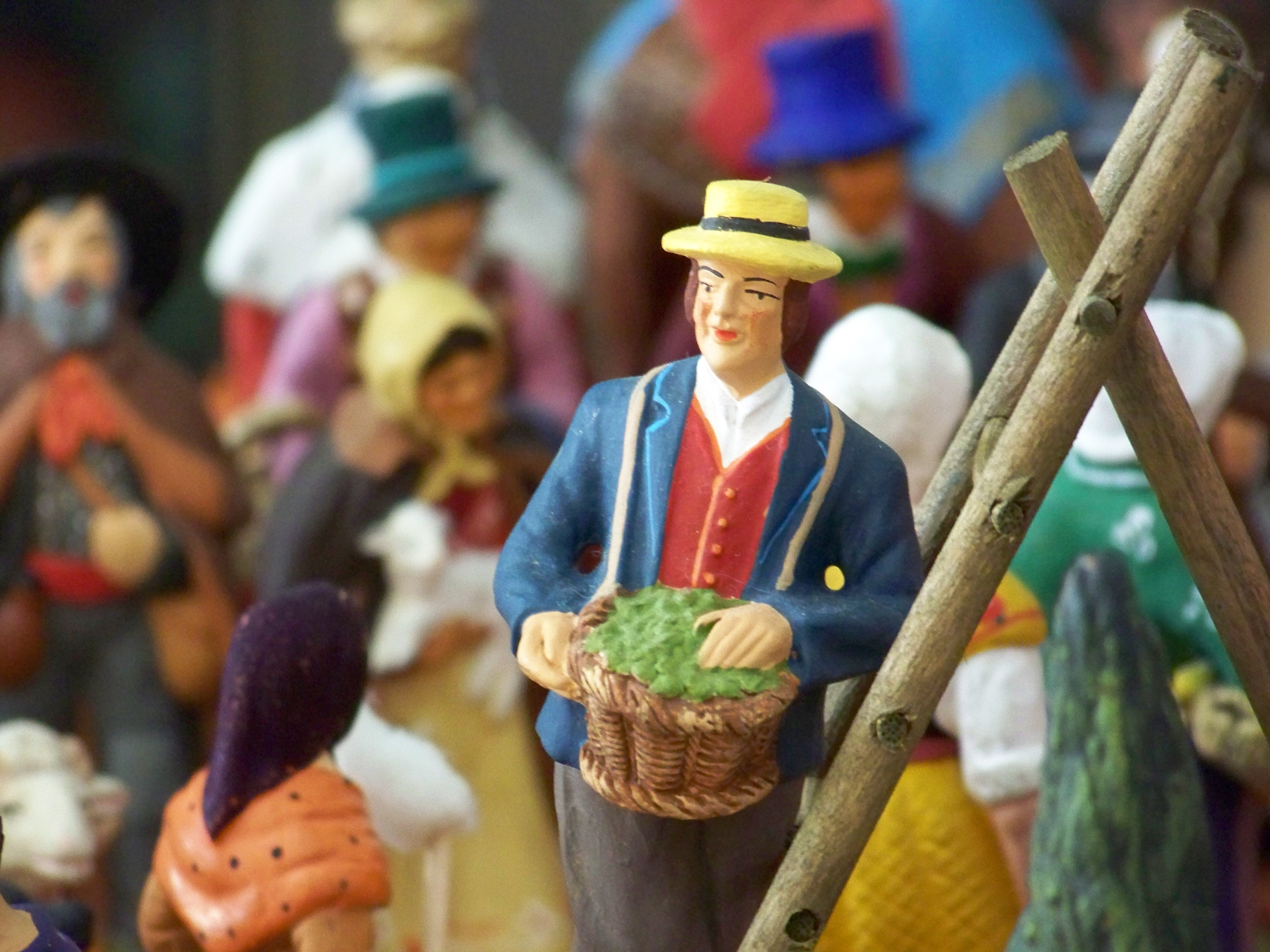
A Santon of a produce seller

=== Industry, trade and crafts ===
- Industry:
  - Zones of Activity (ZAC): Paluds, La Martelle (shops: Auchan and others), Napallon Business Park;
  - Thales Underwater Systems currently has one of two establishments in France at Aubagne. The other is at Brest;
- Agriculture: there are farms at various locations in Aubagne (Huveaune Valley, Beaudinard, Napollon);
- Ceramic Crafts:: terracotta, Santon figurines; the appearance of domestic nurseries has allowed the development of Santon makers who now continue this art in a dozen workshops;
- Janot Distillery: produces its Gambetta syrup and its Janot Pastis in Aubagne;
- Sartorius Stedim Biotech: produces biopharmaceutical equipment;
- Viticulture: Aubagne is a wine commune located in the geographical areas of IGP Bouches-du-Rhone and the Mediterranean IGP;
- Branch office of the Chambre de commerce et d'industrie Marseille-Provence (Chamber of Commerce and Industry Marseille-Provence).

=== Budget and indebtedness ===
Aubagne is one of the most indebted cities in France. According to the latest report of the Court of Auditors of PACA (July 2013), the debt amounts to 157.6 million euros. According to a ranking published by Le Journal du Net, Aubagne would place 3rd for debt per head of 3,685 Euros per capita - about 5 times the national average. Only Cannes and Levallois-Perret, much richer communes, are higher. The total indebtedness of 119.9 million euros in 2010 exploded in 2013 to reach EUR 157.6 million. The debt servicing payments have at the same time multiplied by 3.1 from 8.626 million euros to 26.933 million euros between 2010 and 2011.

The listing for Aubagne by the French Fitch Ratings agency in 2010 was "BBB−": "We have downgraded the city of Aubagne due to a strong presence of structured products, along with a very low savings rate and high debt loads. The rating has changed from "A−" to "BBB−" - the lowest category for this investment type" Subsequently the city has not wanted to pursue the issue of its credit status.

In 2009 Aubagne municipality renegotiated certain loans considered "toxic" which were based on risky products contracted with ABN AMRO bank (loans now owned by NatWest Group). Risky loans have been converted to fixed-rate borrowings: less advantageous but less risky. The Court of Auditors in 2013 noted that these renegotiations resulted in additional financial burden borne by the commune of the order of 50 to 70 million Euros (19 million for the Dexia and Caisse d'Epargne loans and 25 to 43 million for the RBS loan).

Investments in the commune are about half the average for French communes in the same stratum: approximately 13.3% of revenues against 31.4% according to the administrative accounts for the commune in 2012.

Finally the Observatory of subsidies has repeatedly criticized the management of the city of Aubagne, particularly for subsidies not related to the commune or representing a "waste of public money".

=== Taxation ===
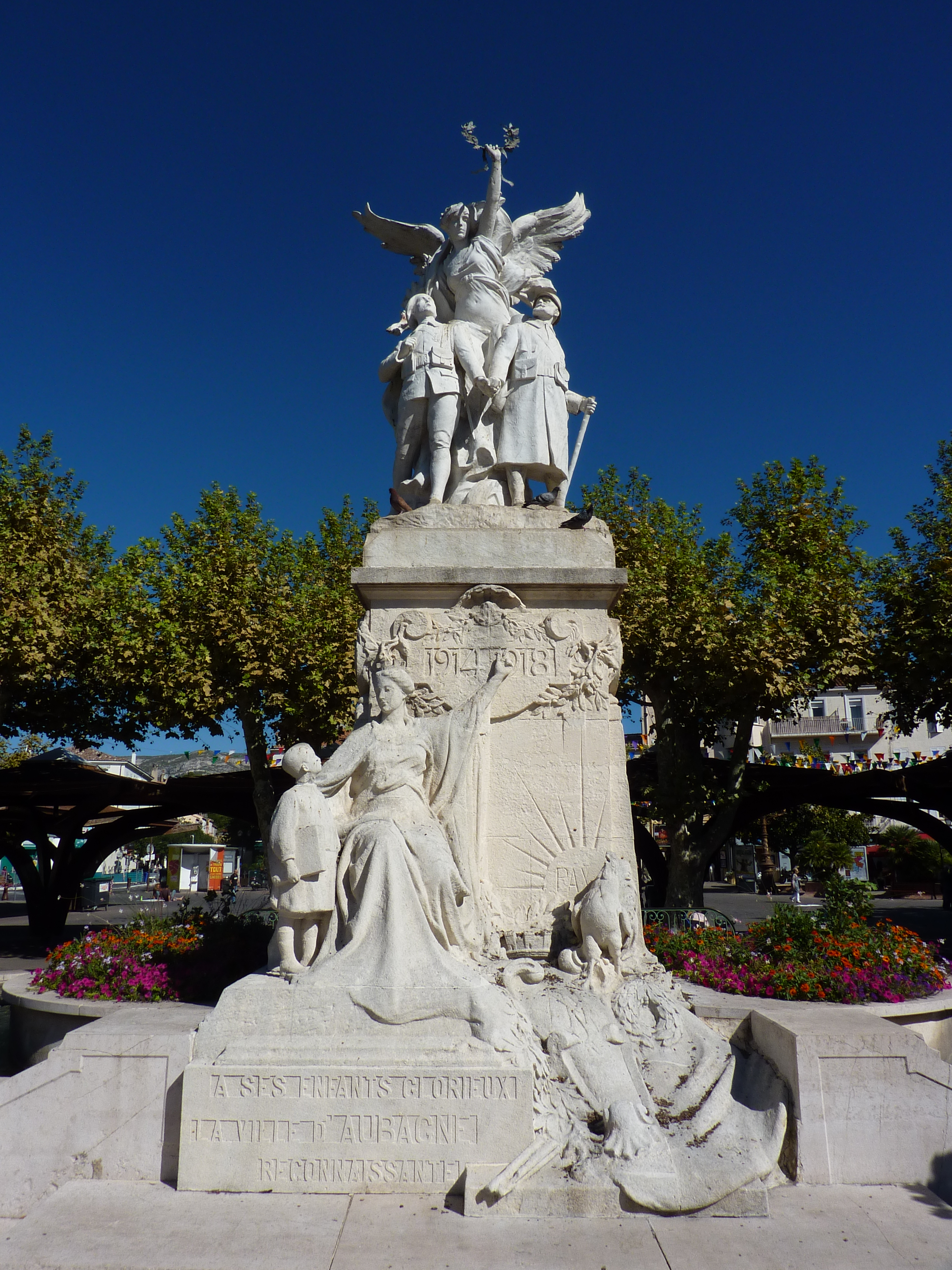
The War Memorial

The 2012 Administrative Accounts for the commune mentions a result of 662 euros per capita tax for Aubagne against 482 euros for the stratum of comparable communes - or higher taxes by 37%.

Aubagne is part of the "Top 20" of towns who have increased their taxes the most in 2012. The city ranks 12th in France for the highest increases in taxes in 2012 according to the website Challenges.fr

== Culture and heritage ==
=== Civil heritage ===
- The War Memorial (1922), registered as a historical monument
- The French Foreign Legion Museum
- Thérèse Neveu Studio
- Birthplace of Marcel Pagnol

=== Religious heritage ===
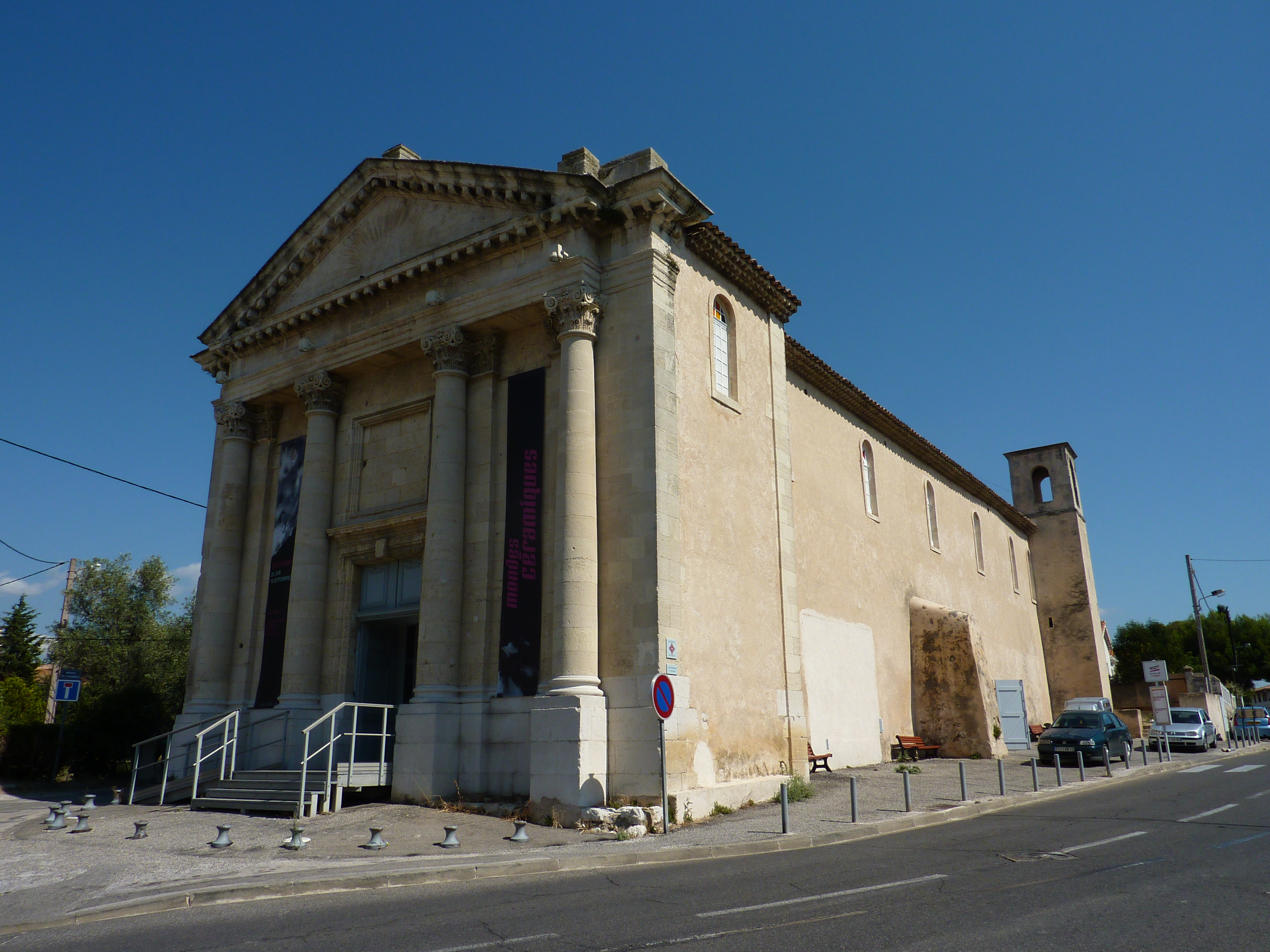
Chapel of the Black Penitents

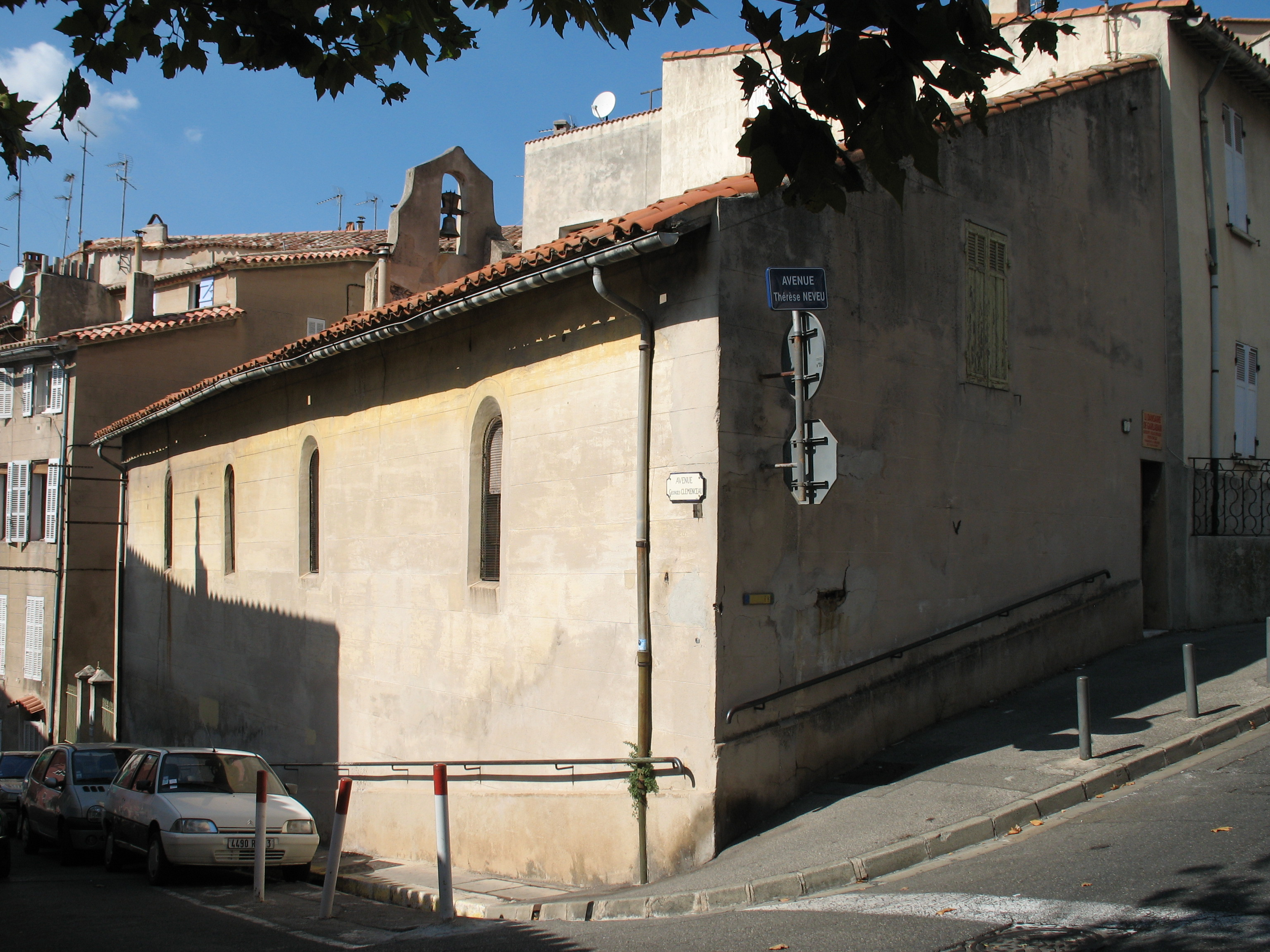
Chapel of the Grey Penitents

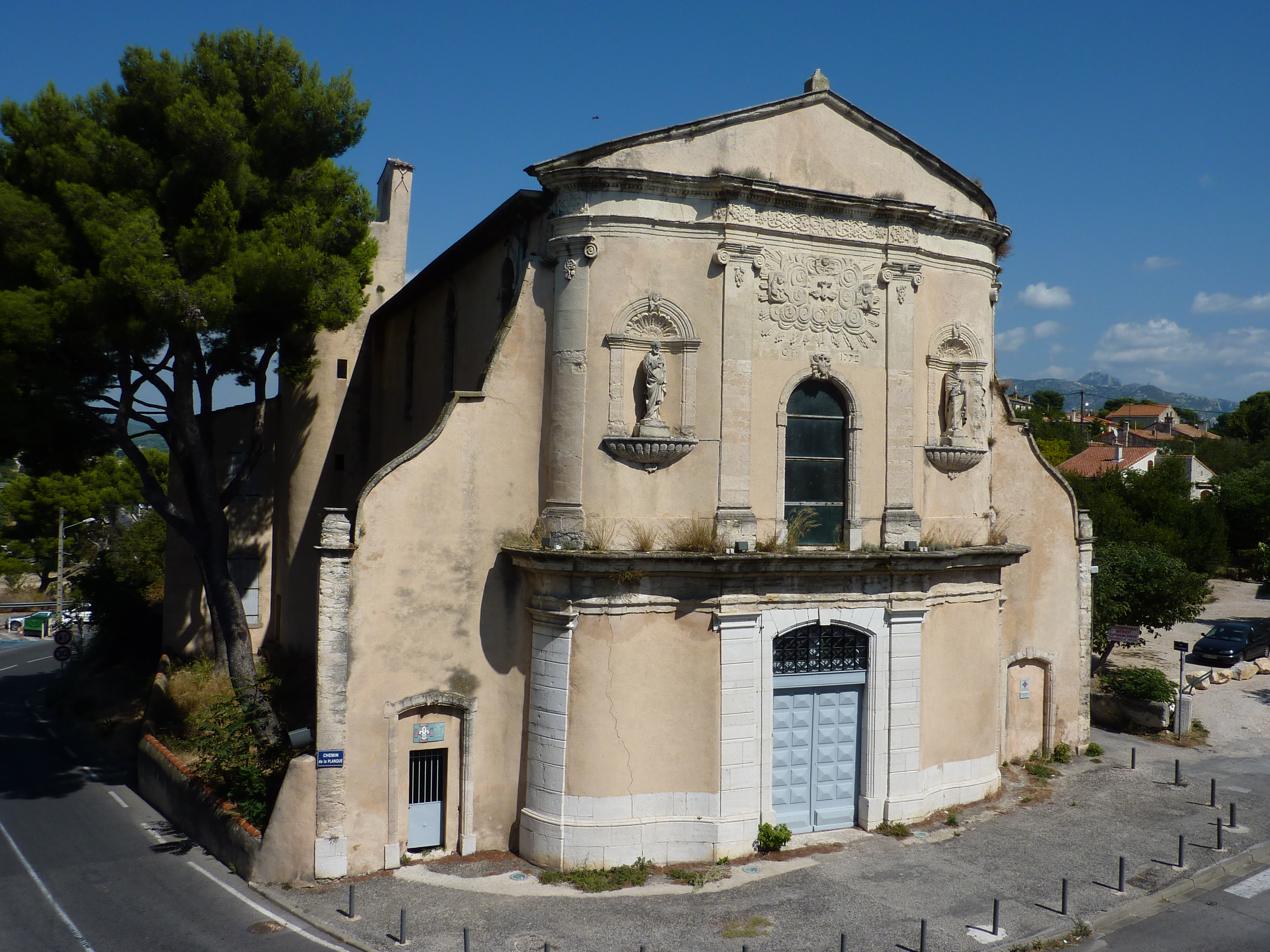
Chapel of the White Penitents

- The Chapel of Black Penitents contains one item that is registered as a historical object:
  - A Painting: Beheading of Saint John the Baptist (1695)
- The Chapel of Grey Penitents
- The Chapel of White Penitents contains several items that are registered as historical objects:
  - A Painting: The death of Saint Joseph (19th century)
  - A Painting: Purgatory (18th century)
  - A Painting: Sainte Parenté (17th century)
  - A Painting with frame: Incredulity of Saint Thomas (17th century)
- The Church of Saint-Sauveur contains several items that are registered as historical objects:
  - Instrumental part of the Organ (1784)
  - Rostrum Organ (1784)
- The Chapel of the Observance contains a Statue of the Virgin and Child (17th century) which is registered as a historical object.
- The Church of Saint-Pierre-les-Aubagne contains many items that are registered as historical objects:
  - A Statue: Christ aux liens (16th century)
  - Stalls (18th century)
  - Painting: The Circumcision (17th century)
  - Painting: The disciples of Emmaus (17th century)
  - Panelling, floor coverings and Sideboard in the Sacristy (18th century)
  - Reliquary (18th century)
  - Commemorative plaque for the consecration of the church (17th century)
  - Bust-reliquary: Saint Matthieu (18th century)
  - Retable: 2 angels adoring the paschal Lamb (18th century)
  - 2 Bas-reliefs: The Adoration of the Magii and the Descent from the Cross (18th century)
  - Painting: Virgin & child and St. John the Baptist (16th century)
  - Main Altar, Altar seating, Tabernacle (18th century)
  - 2 Bronze Bells (17th century)
- Bastide of La Royante Known as "The Bishop's manor" in past centuries, this bastide (country manor) displays a gothic chapel with remarkable statues and stained glass windows.
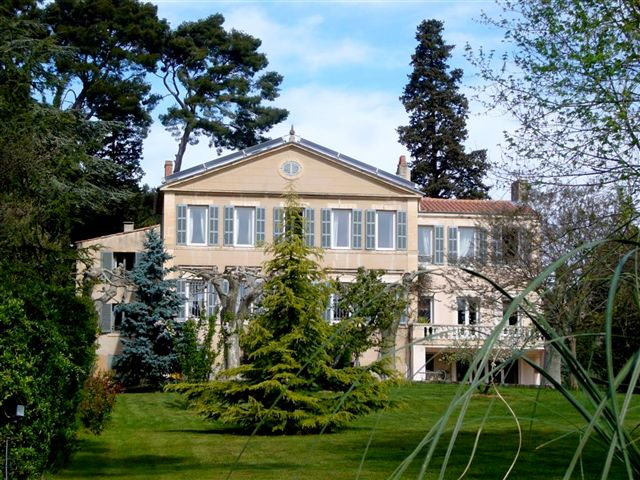
La Royante

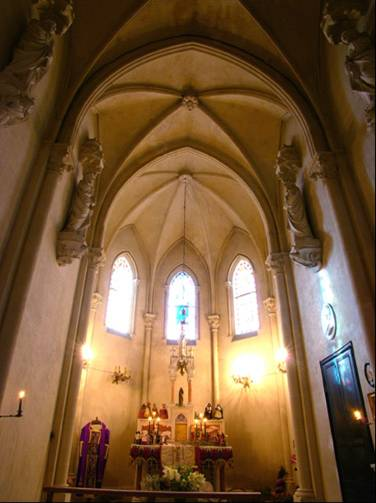
La Royante chapel

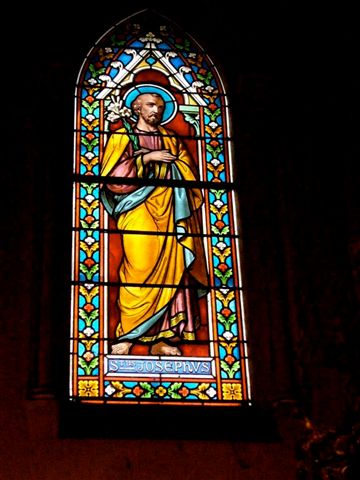
Stained glass in La Royante chapel
- La Morochita

=== Environmental heritage ===
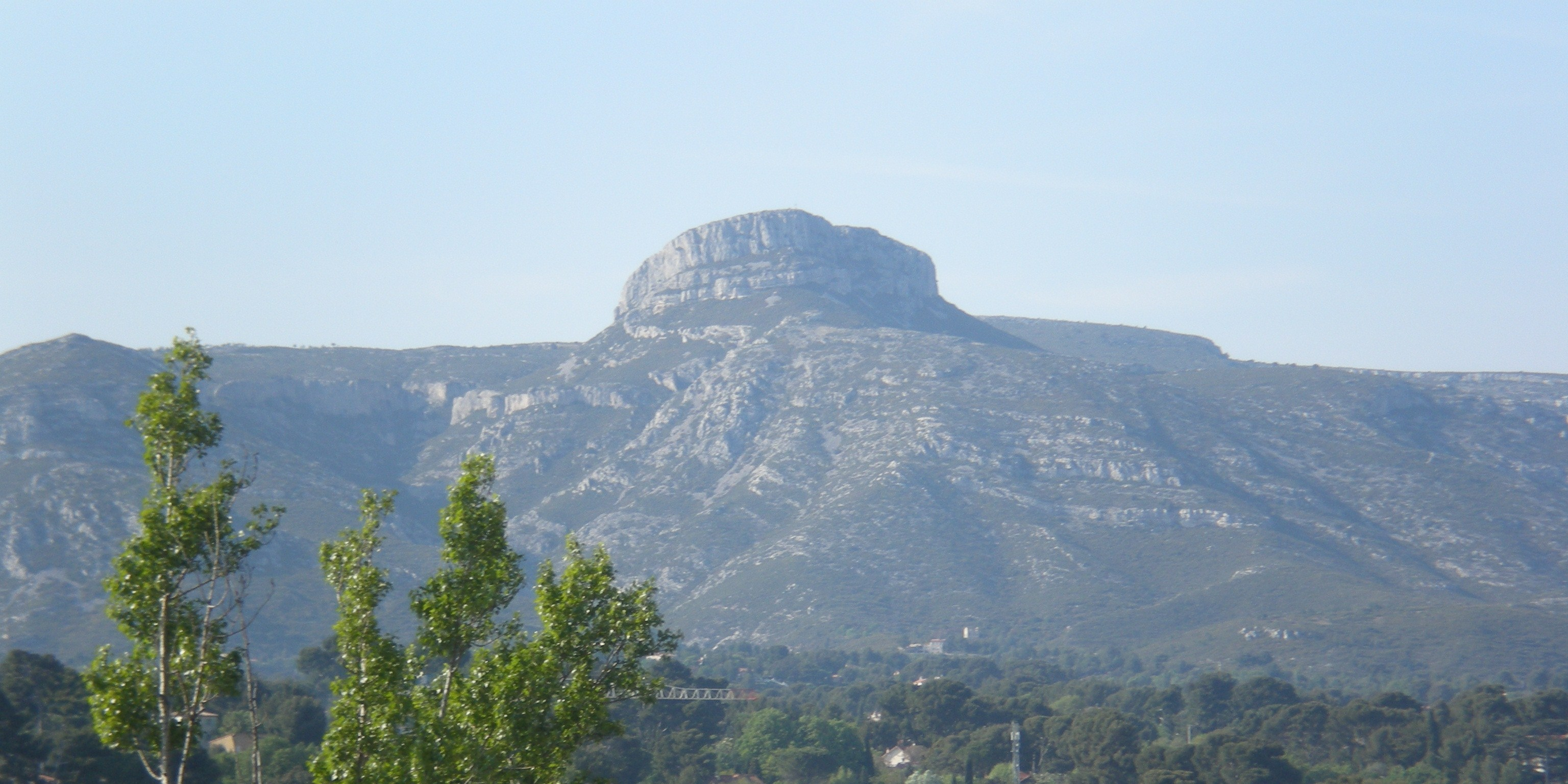
The Garlaban hill viewed from Aubagne

- The Garlaban hill

=== Cinematic heritage ===
Aubagne is the birthplace of Marcel Pagnol, home to the University of Image and Sound (Satis department), 9 cinemas (Cinema Palace and Pagnol), and an International Film Festival.

Aubagne is referred to frequently in the film Manon des Sources.

The Aubagne Ciné Passion association was founded in late 1989 by Charles Villani at a time when cinema was in crisis. Rapidly bringing in many members, its activity was intense and from 1992 until 1999 it organized the 1st Festival of Passions sponsored by Ticky Holgado and Gérard Jugnot. Thereafter each year the Festival featuring long and short films takes place in October or November. Numerous directors, actors, screenwriters, and producers come to present their works in advance of their premier at the Festival of Passions: Jean-Claude Carrière, John Malkovich, Christopher Lee, Lio, Jean-François Stévenin, Jacques Marin, Carmen Chaplin, Paul Vecchiali, Mathieu Demy, Julie Gayet, Benoît Magimel, Pierre Sullice, Olivier Austen, Luc Palun, Catherine Jacob, Marc de Jonge, Michel Voletti, Pomme Meffre, Yannick Bellon, Franck Fernandel... and of course Ticky Holgado and Gérard Jugnot.

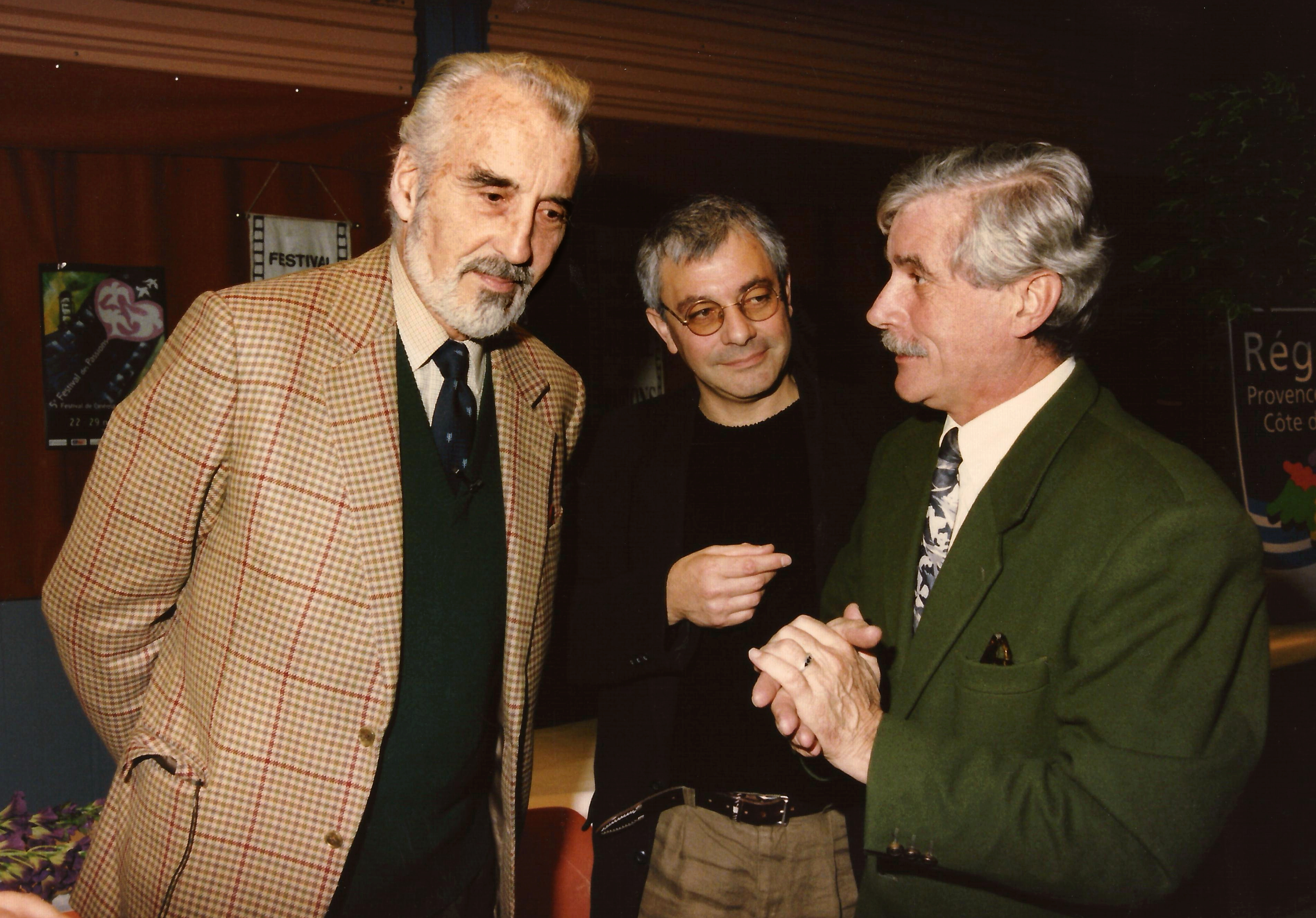
Christopher Lee met by Charles Villani at Aubagne for the Festival of Passions

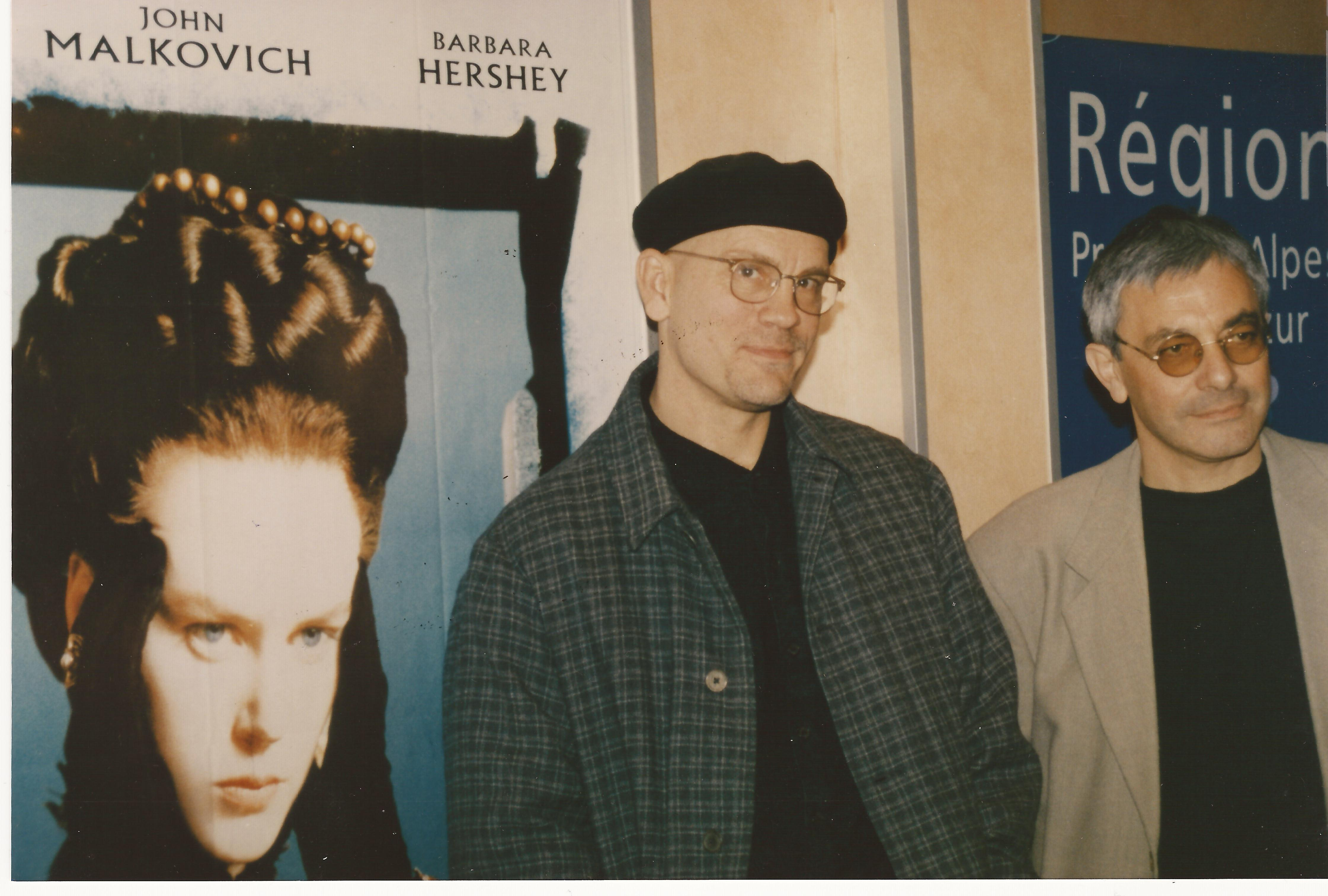
John Malkovich and Charles Villani at the Festival of Passions in Aubagne

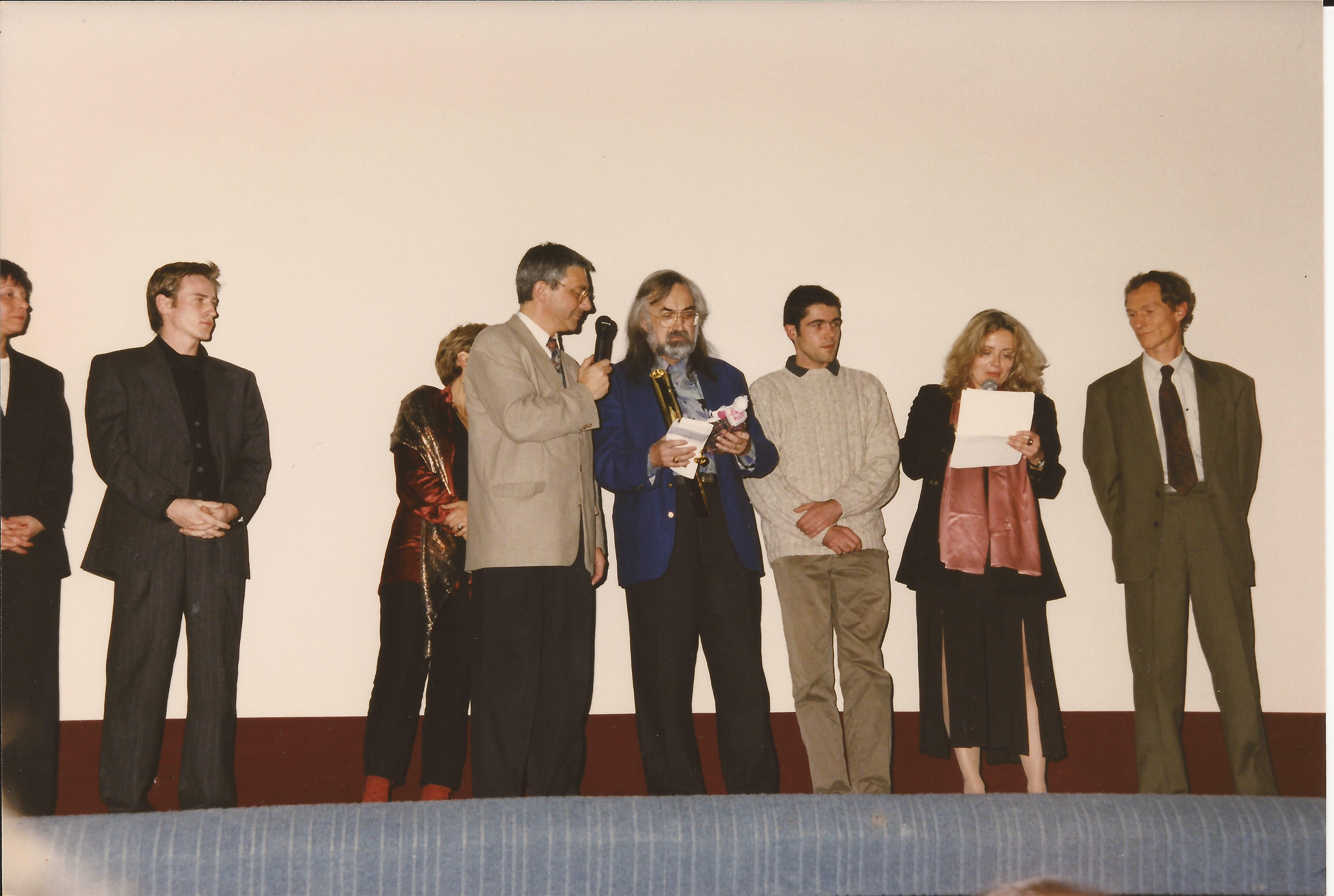
Prizegiving at the Festival of Passions in the presence of Benoît Magimel, Sophie Barjac, Charles Villani (Aubagne Ciné Passion), Jean-Michel Descombes (Festival Saint Jean de Luz)

In 2000 the City of Aubagne request 3 associations: Alphée (photos), Aubagne Ciné Passion (long films), Méridiens (short films) to merge to organize an international film festival. The association of Alcimé was then created, chaired by Charles Villani for its first year and its first festival called FIFA (International Film Festival of Aubagne) that endured. In 2001 differences of perspective caused the departure of Aubagne Ciné Passion from the Alcimé structure. Charles Villani passed the chairmanship to Jean Michel Descombes (General Delegate of the Young Filmmakers Festival of Saint-Jean-de-Luz) and, in 2002, the association went to the nearby commune of Gémenos to organize the RCG (Cinematographers Meetings in Gémenos). Gisèle Mezzina became the president of Aubagne Ciné Passion. Since 2007, the last year of the RCG, the association continues its activities with its circle of members.

== Cultural events and festivities ==
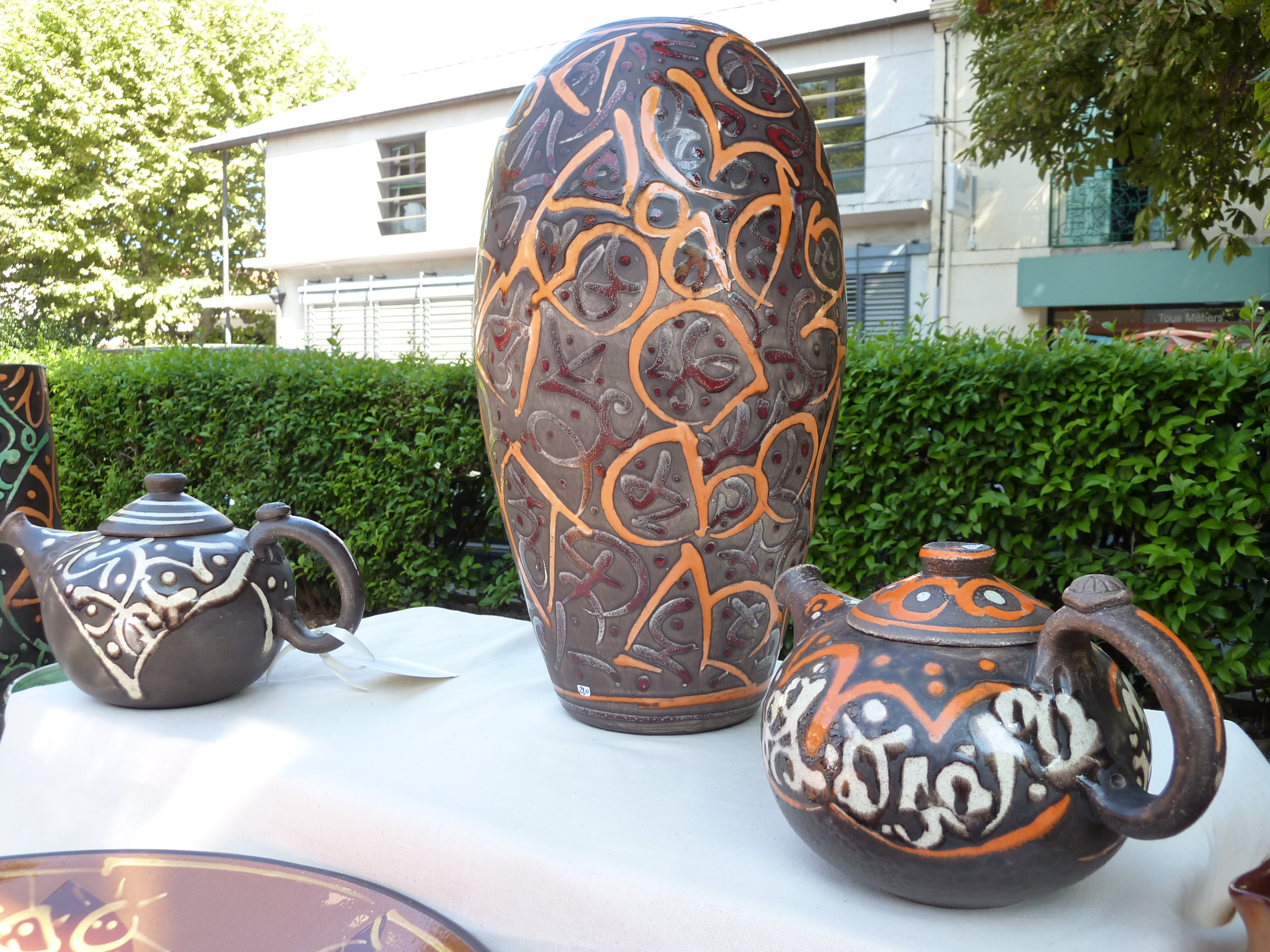
Modern pottery in Aubagne

In the summer of 2013, the city hosted a mobile Annex from the Centre Georges Pompidou as part of the Marseille-Provence 2013 events.

Each year Aubagne has a series of regular and one-off events:

January

- Old postcards, stamps and old papers Exchange

March

- International Film Festival of Aubagne (ranked among the 20 most important film festivals in France out of 350)
- Women's Day

April

- Dance in April
- Camerone (Commemoration of the Battle of Camarón in the Foreign Legion)

May

- Festival of Neighbours

June

- Music festival
- Schools Gala
- The Santon makers Trophy

July

- Festimôme
- The International Festival of singular art

August

Argilla, Festival of ceramics and a pottery market.

- The great cavalcade

September

- The festival of peace

October

- The Great Rendezvous of Aubagne

November

- Children's Book Days

December

- The Biennial of santon makers art

There are also the Scientific Tuesdays of Aubagne

== Facilities ==
=== Education ===
There are 30 schools in Aubagne including:

- Primary schools: Jean-Mermoz, Passons, Chaulan, Antide-Boyer, Charrel, Tourtelle, Camp-Major, Pin-Vert, Victor-Hugo, and Paul-Eluard Perrussonne;
- Colleges: Joseph-Lakanal, Lou Garlaban;
- High schools: Joliot-Curie, Eiffel, and Sainte-Marie (renowned for its success rate in the Baccalauréat and its level of education: the premier High School of Bouches-du-Rhône and 14th nationally, it is considered one of the best schools in the Provence-Alpes-Côte d'Azur and even in France).

The SATIS department (Cinema/Audiovisual), attached to the University of Provence, is also located in Aubagne.

=== Health ===
- Edmond-Garcin Hospital is a general hospital centrally positioned to be available to 230,000 inhabitants of eastern Bouches-du-Rhône as well as western Var.
- La Casamance Clinic

=== Sports ===
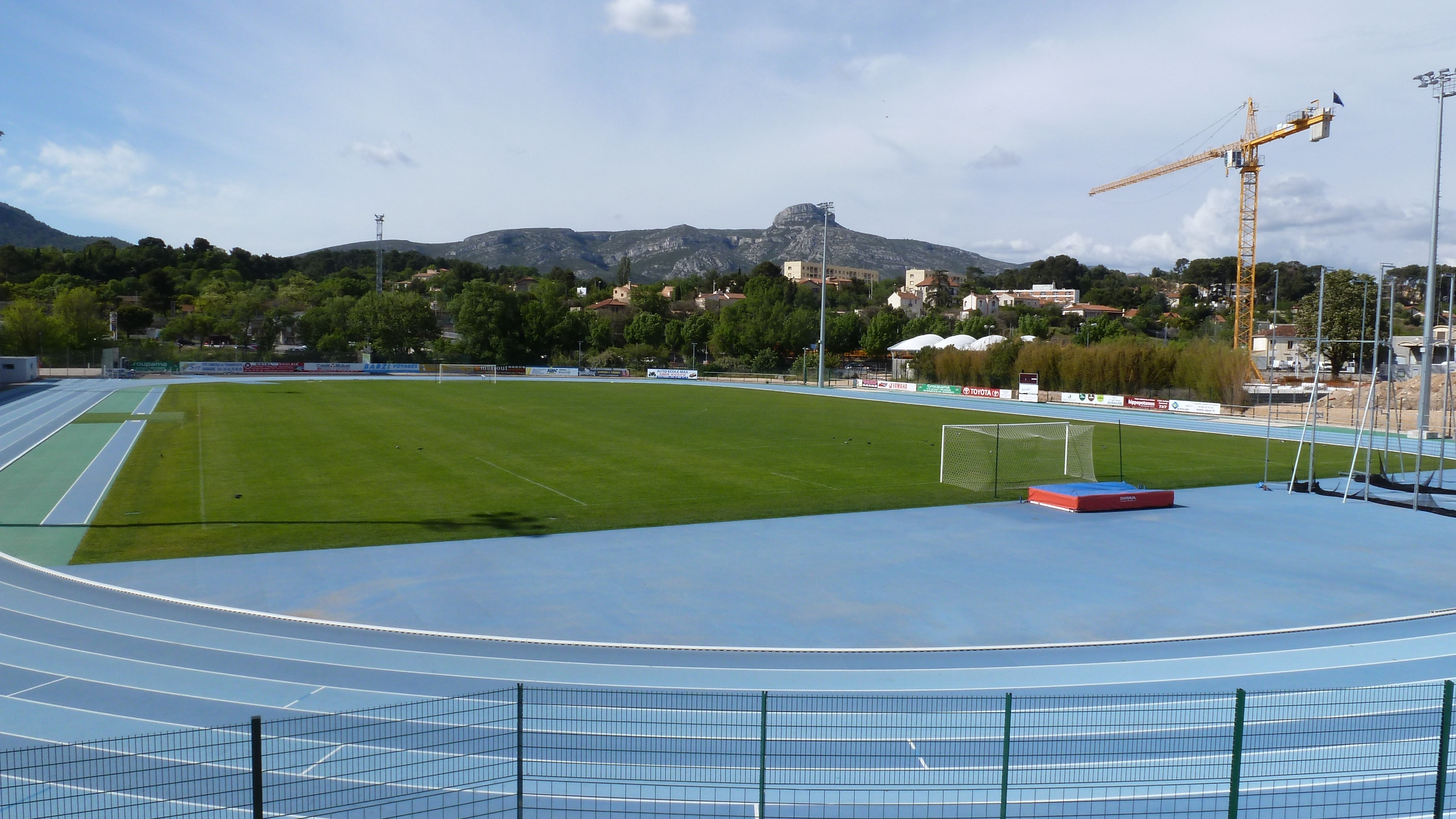
Lattre-de-Tassigny Stadium

- Lattre-de-Tassigny Stadium (home ground of Aubagne FC)
- Bras d'Or Stadium
- Complex Serge-Mésonès
- Complex Mouren
- Complex Charrel
- Tennis Complex at Saint-Pierre-les-Aubagne
- 6 sports fields
- 5 fields nearby
- 6 Gymnasium facilities
- 1 indoor swimming pool (Alain-Bernard at Charrel)
- 1 skating rink ("Mégaglace")- closed in 2013

=== Foreign Legion Garrison ===
Since 1962 the Foreign Legion Command and the 1st Foreign Regiment of the Foreign Legion has had 800 men stationed at Aubagne.

For the centenary of the Battle of Camarón on 30 April 1963 the war memorial, which had been placed in the Vienot barracks in Sidi Bel Abbès, was repatriated to Aubagne. This monument depicts a globe flanked by four legionnaires. The bronze statue was designed by sculptor Henri Pourquet. The weight of the monument is 80 tonnes.

The French Foreign Legion Museum is located at Aubagne in the Viénot barracks: it commemorates all of the military campaigns of the Legion in history with displays showing the evolution of uniforms, weapons, and decorations until today. The crypt houses the wooden hand of Captain Jean Danjou.

== Notable people ==
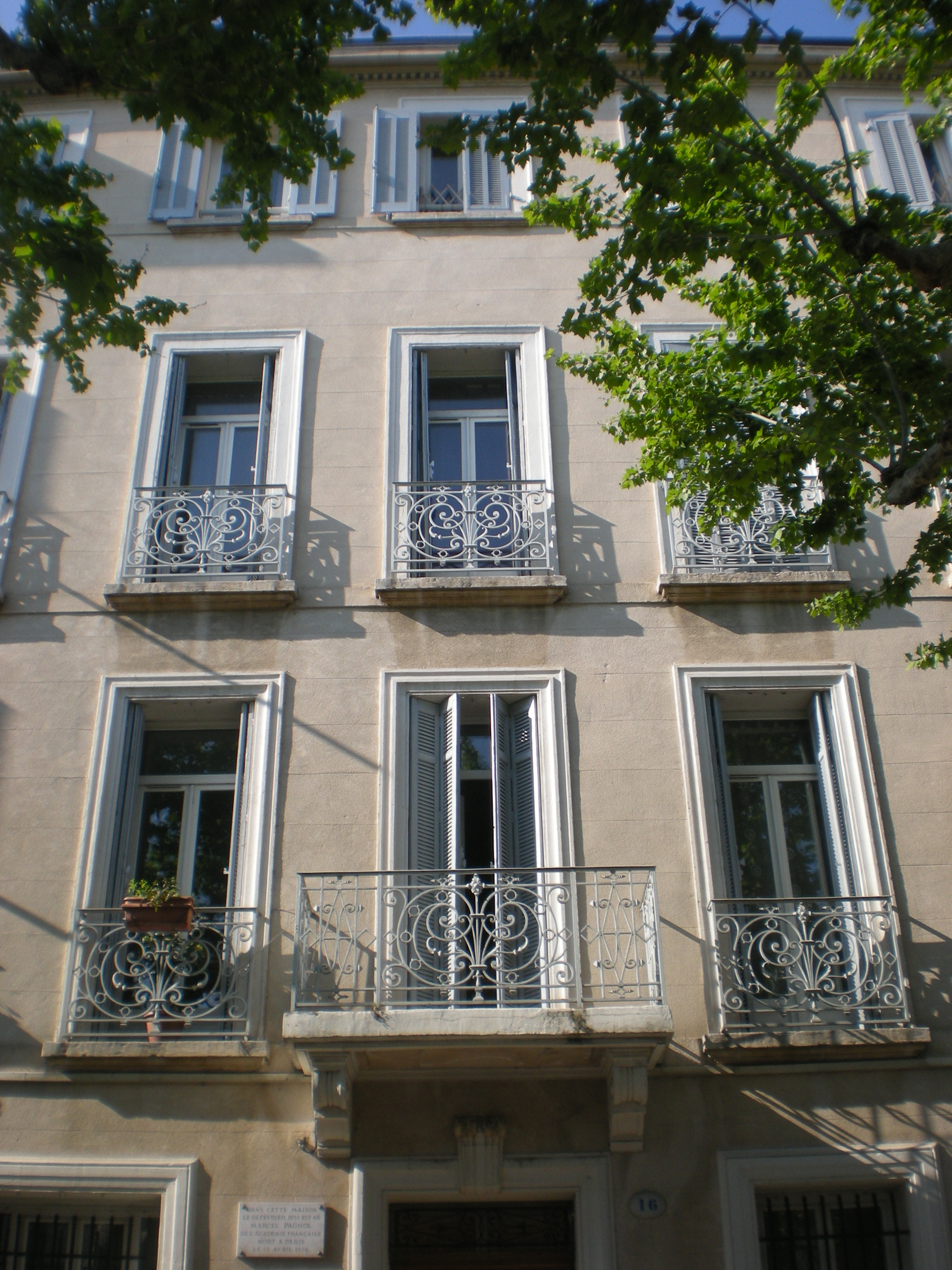
Birthplace of Marcel Pagnol

- François-Urbain Domergue (1745-1810), grammarian and journalist elected to the Académie française.
- François Barthélemy (1747-1830), one of the Directors of the French First Republic.
- Honoré Joseph Antoine Ganteaume (1755-1818), Vice-Admiral of the Royal Marine and of the Republic.
- Antide Boyer (1850–1918), French railway worker and politician, born in Aubagne
- Fernand Bouisson (1874-1959), President of the Chamber of Deputies from 1927 to 1936, President of the Council in 1935, elected Mayor of Aubagne in 1906.
- Marcel Pagnol (1895-1974), writer and filmmaker, born in Aubagne; it was in the hills near Aubagne that his romantic diptyque L'Eau des collines (Water from the Hills) was set.
- Henri Crémieux (1896-1980), Actor and French scriptwriter, born in Aubagne.
- Louis Sicard (1871 - 1946), French sculptor, ceramist, writer and teacher.
- René Marsiglia (born in 1959), footballer then entertainer.
- Rafaël Galiana (born in 1960), racing driver
- Bernard Casoni (born in 1961), football player and coach who lived in Aubagne.
- Fabien Barthez (born in 1971), footballer who lived in Aubagne.
- Stéphane Pignol (born in 1977), footballer.
- Alain Bernard (born in 1983 in Aubagne), swimmer, world record holder in 2008 of the 100 metres freestyle and the 50 metres freestyle, and olympic champion in the 100 metres freestyle.

== See also ==
- Communes of the Bouches-du-Rhône department
- Henri Raybaud
