= Hôtel de Ville, Aubagne =

Town hall in Aubagne, France

Hôtel de Ville
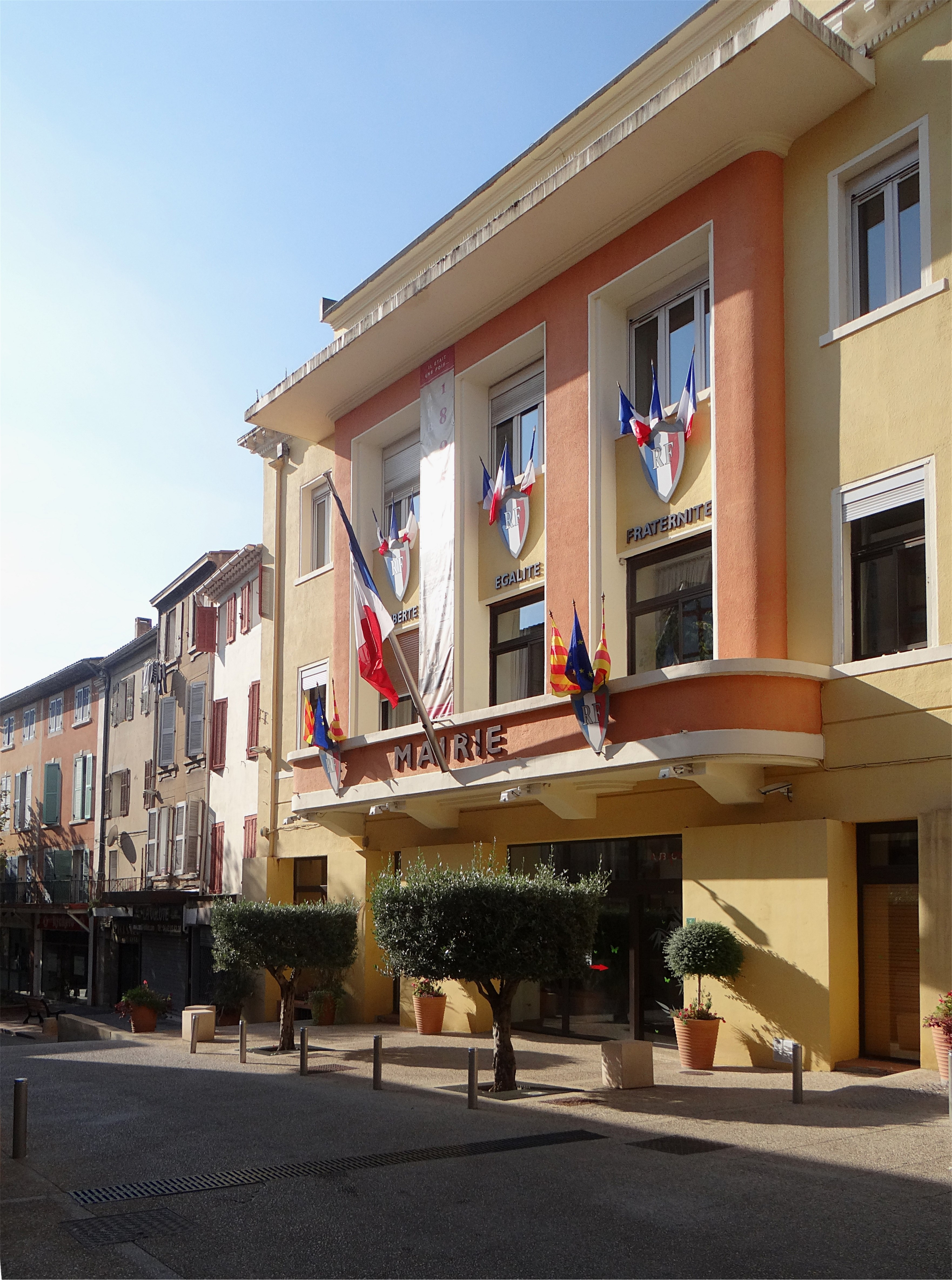
- The main frontage of the Hôtel de Ville in October 2016
- Interactive map of the Hôtel de Ville area

General information
- Type: City hall
- Architectural style: Art Deco style
- Location: Aubagne, France
- Coordinates: 43.2924°N 5.5694°E
- Completed: 1828

The Hôtel de Ville (French pronunciation: [otɛl də vil], City Hall) is a municipal building in Aubagne, Bouches-du-Rhône, in southern France, standing on Boulevard Jean Jaurès.

== History ==
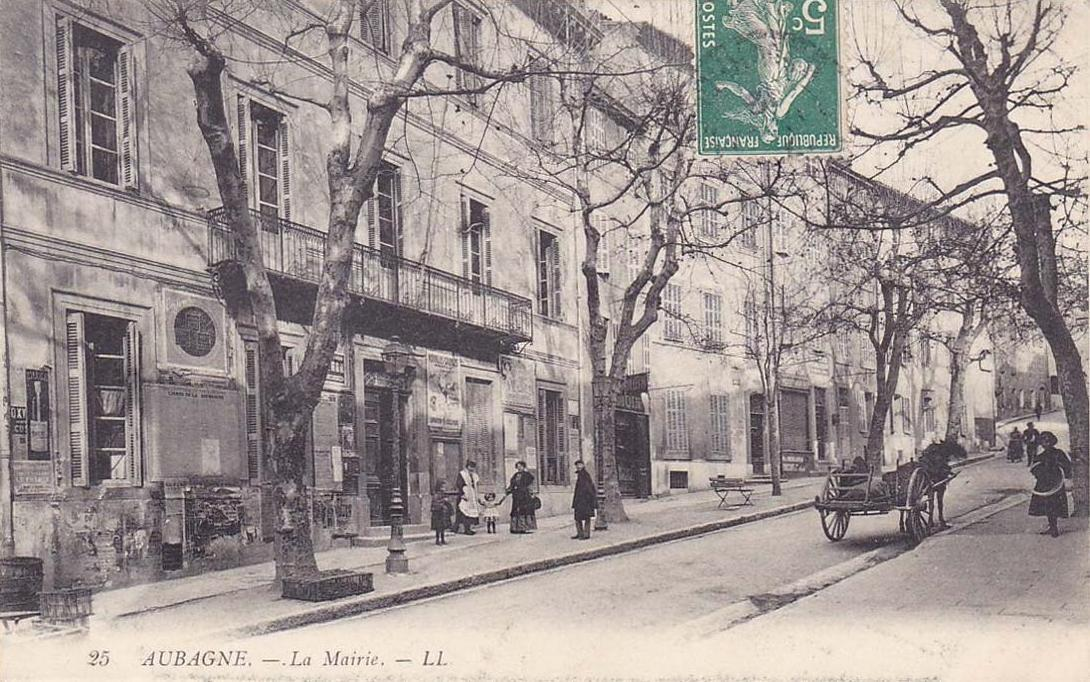
The building in the early 20th century

After the local seigneur, Bertrand II des Baux, granted certain rights to local communal councils in the area in 1300, the local council in Aubagne met in a room allocated to the Confrérie du Saint Esprit (Brotherhood of the Holy Spirit) in a building adjacent to the Church of Saint-Sauveur. This arrangement continued until the council relocated to a room above the local communal kitchen between Rue du Four and Rue Gachiou in 1618.

Following the French Revolution, the council decided to acquire a dedicated municipal building. The building they selected was a house in Rue Saint-Matthieu (now Boulevard Jean Jaurès) dating back at least to the early 19th century. The council initiated a programme of conversion works after completing the acquisition of the building in 1828. The design involved a symmetrical main frontage of five bays facing onto Rue Saint-Matthieu. There was a square headed doorway with a stone surround on the ground floor, and a wide balcony with iron railings and three French doors on the first floor. The other bays on all three floors were fenestrated with casement windows with shutters.

In the early 1930s, the council led by the mayor, Marius Boyer, decided to give the building a radical face-lift. The main frontage was remodelled in the Art Deco style, with the central three bays on the upper floors being framed by pilasters, and the whole frontage being given a stucco finish. The stucco on the balcony and on the upper floors was painted bright orange, while the stucco on the ground floor and on the outer bays was painted bright yellow. Internally, the principal room was the Salle des Mariages (wedding room), which was decorated with murals by Jean-Frédéric Canepa and Jean Lyon. After the work was completed, the building was officially reopened on 8 September 1934.

Following the allied landings in southern France in early August 1944, during the Second World War, a group from the French Resistance led by Alexandre Gilly stormed the town hall in Aubagne on 16 August 1944, in advance of the battle of Marseille which took place later that month. Notable post-war visitors to the town hall included commanding officer of the French Foreign Legion, Lieutenant-Colonel Albéric Vaillant, in November 1962, the cosmonaut, Yuri Gagarin, in September 1967, and the novelist, Marcel Pagnol, in August 1972.
