= Émile Doumergue =

French church historian and theologian

Émile Doumergue (1844–1937) was a French scholar of John Calvin who wrote the seven volume John Calvin: The Man and His Times, which was published between 1899 and 1927. He was professor of ecclesiastical history at the Theology Faculty of Montauban from 1880 until 1919.

Doumergue portrayed Calvin as the "founder of modern freedoms" and said that the areas where Calvinism was popular were also the areas where democracy established itself.
