= David Dellepiane =

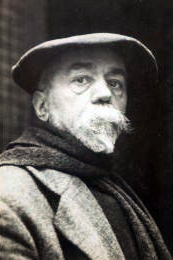
David Dellepiane (early 1900s)

Davide Paolo Dellepiane, known as David Dellepiane (16 October 1866, Genoa – 25 June 1932, Marseille) was a French painter, lithographer and poster artist of Italian origin.

== Biography ==
He moved to France with his family in 1875. His father, Vittorio, a supporter of Garibaldi, was apparently compelled to leave for political reasons. They initially settled in Saint-Jean, a district that was home to many Italian expatriates.

Most of his relatives were craftspeople; his grandfather was a decorator, his grandmother, a gold embroiderer, and his father, a woodcarver who found employment with the French Navy.

In 1880, he entered the École des Beaux-Arts de Marseille, where he studied with Marius Guindon until 1885, followed by a brief stay in Genoa. After 1890, he lived in Paris, where he was influenced by the poster art of Alfons Mucha. Later, he worked under the direction of Jules Chéret, another well known poster artist, who taught him lithography. For a time, he also studied Japanese art.

Upon returning to Marseille, he set up his first workshop along the canal, on a street that was home to many other artists, including Alfred Casile, Valère Bernard, René Seyssaud, Joseph Garibaldi and Eugène Giraud

His first success came with a poster created in 1899 for the 25th centenary of the founding of Marseille; representing the legend of Protis and Gyptis. In 1903, the newly formed Provençal Tourist Office (Syndicat d'Initiative de Provence) held a competition to design a poster, which Dellepiane won. He worked regularly for the Chemins de fer de Paris à Lyon et à la Méditerranée. He also designed posters for the Exposition coloniale de Marseille (1906) and the Exposition coloniale de Marseille (1922). In 1925, he decorated the Grand Hôtel in Juan-les-Pins.

A street in the 7th arrondissement of Marseille was named after him in 1937.

== Selected works ==
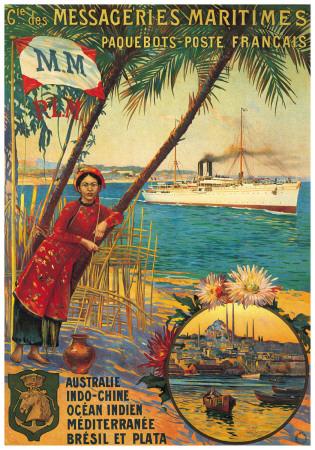
Messageries Maritimes
(ship company)

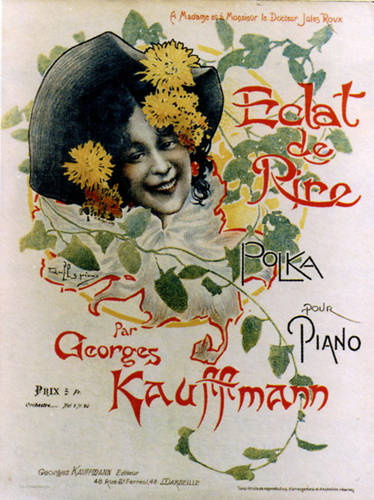
"Peal of Laughter"
(sheet music)

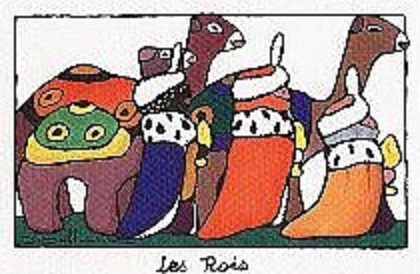
The Three Wise Men (porcelain design)

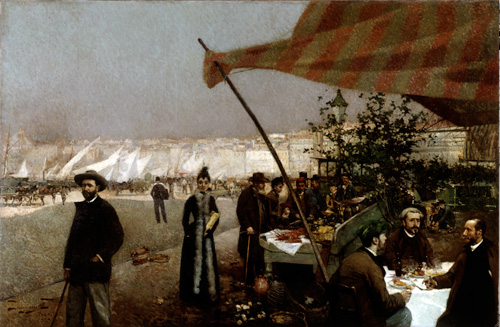
The Port of Brégaillon (La Seyne-sur-Mer)

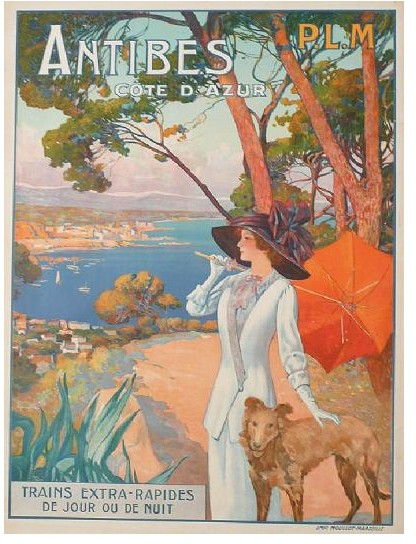
PLM (railway company)

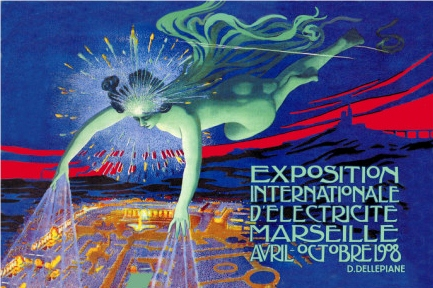
The Electricity Fairy
