= François-Urbain Domergue =

French grammarian and journalist

François-Urbain Domergue (French pronunciation: [fʁɑ̃swa yʁbɛ̃ dɔmɛʁɡ]; 24 March 1745 – 29 May 1810) was a French grammarian and journalist known for his Jacobin ideals.

Born in Aubagne to, the son of an apothecary, Domergue studied in his hometown of Aubagne, Bouches-du-Rhône and later at an oratory college in Marseille. He became a teacher in Lyon, and married a surgeon's daughter and released the first edition of his Grammaire françoise simplifiée (Simplified French grammar) in 1778. In 1784 he founded the Journal de la Langue Françoise (Journal of the French Language), which had among his objectives to fight against neologisms. After that book didn't sell well, he went to Paris and established a society of amateur French linguists. He had his Grammaire simplifiée book re-edited, collaborated in the Journal général du soir, de politique et de littérature and rereleased his Journal de la Langue Françoise book. He became grammar professor at the École centrale des Quatre-Nations, and later chaired the humanities department at the Lycée Charlemagne in Paris. He was elected to Seat 1 of the Académie française in 1803, and helped commission the Academy's dictionary.

Domerque died in Paris, France, in 1810.
