= Autoroute 50 =

Autoroute 50 may refer to:

- A50 autoroute, in France
- Quebec Autoroute 50, in Quebec, Canada

== See also ==
- A50 roads
- List of highways numbered 50
