= A52 autoroute =

Road in France

A52 autoroute

Route information
- Maintained by ESCOTA
- Length: 25.3 km (15.7 mi)
- Existed: 1974–present

Major junctions
- North end: E80 / A 8 in Châteauneuf-le-Rouge

- A 520 in Roquevaire; A 501 / A 502 in Aubagne

- South end: A 50 in Aubagne

Location
- Country: France

Highway system
- Roads in France; Autoroutes; Routes nationales

The A52 autoroute is a 25.3 km long motorway in the Bouches du Rhone departement of southeastern France. The road links the A8 autoroute with the A50 autoroute and runs from a junction 1 km east of the Péage de La Barque on the A8 to near the town of Aubagne where it meets the A50. It is a toll road except for the very southern stretch south of the Péage du Pont d'Etoile and is operated by ESCOTA. Traffic information for the road is covered by Radio Vinci Autoroutes (FM107.7). It is a mixture of 2x2 and 2x3 lane road, with recent construction work to widen some of the 2x2 lane sections (2018).

The A52 effectively provides a bypass of the city of Marseille, enabling those travelling between Toulon/Hyeres and Aix-en-Provence and Lyon to avoid travelling through the city.

When travelling southbound from Aix-en-Provence to Toulon, one must take the exit slip after the Péage du Pont d'Etoile in order to remain on the A52. This anomaly is a result of the construction history of the motorway.

== History of the A52 ==
In 1962, an autoroute named the A52 was constructed between Marseille and Auriol in order to offer a fast link part of the way between Marseille and Nice. The southern section of the current road, then known as the East Motorway, was constructed and designated A52 in 1963, the original section subsequently to be known as the western end of the A50 autoroute and the A501. The A50 section between Marseille and what is now the A501 was extended eastwards to link up with the new A52 and onward in stages to Toulon by 1975. The northern section of the A52 was subsequently constructed, joining up with the A8 autoroute creating both a link between Marseille and Nice on the one hand and between Aix-en-Provence and Toulon on the other.

On the A8 at Saint-Maximin-la-Sainte-Baume, a ramp was constructed with a view to continuing what is now the A520 from Auriol to the A8 and linking Marseille to the A8 in the direction of Nice more directly by motorway. This idea was eventually abandoned in favour of a series of developments of the D560 and in view of the construction of the A57 autoroute which provides a similar link, albeit via Toulon.

The original A52 was finally renumbered in 1982 with four different designations, only the section between the north of Aubagne and Roquevaire having kept its original number: A50 between Marseille and Aubagne, A501 north-west of Aubagne and A520 (designated first A53 then A521) to Auriol at the exit on the D560.

== List of junctions ==
Region	Department	km	mi	Junction	Destinations	Notes
Provence-Alpes-Côte d'Azur	Bouches-du-Rhône	0.0	0.0	A8 - A52	Lyon, Aix-en-Provence	
Provence-Alpes-Côte d'Azur	Bouches-du-Rhône	0.0	0.0	A8 - A52	Nice, Cannes, Fréjus, Saint-Raphaël	
Provence-Alpes-Côte d'Azur	Bouches-du-Rhône	7	4.34	33 : Belcodène	Gréasque, La Bouilladisse, Belcodène	
Provence-Alpes-Côte d'Azur	Bouches-du-Rhône	Aire de Marcel Pagnol (Westbound); Aire de Manon des Sources (Eastbound)				
Provence-Alpes-Côte d'Azur	Bouches-du-Rhône	15	9.32	33.1 : Pas-de-Trets	Roquevaire, Auriol, La Destrousse, La Bouilladisse	
Provence-Alpes-Côte d'Azur	Bouches-du-Rhône	17	10.56	A520 - A52	Saint-Zacharie, Auriol	Exit and entry from Aubagne
Provence-Alpes-Côte d'Azur	Bouches-du-Rhône	Péage du Pont de l'Étoile				
Provence-Alpes-Côte d'Azur	Bouches-du-Rhône	22	13.67	34 : Gémenos	Gémenos, Circuit du Castellet	Exit and entry from Aix-en-Provence
Provence-Alpes-Côte d'Azur	Bouches-du-Rhône	23	14.29	A501 - A52	Marseille (A50), Aubagne - centre	
Provence-Alpes-Côte d'Azur	Bouches-du-Rhône	25	15.53	35 : Aubagne	Aubagne - Les Passons, Site des Paluds, Gémenos, Cuges-les-Pins	Exit and entry from Aix-en-Provence
Provence-Alpes-Côte d'Azur	Bouches-du-Rhône	26	16.15	A50 - A52	Toulon, La Ciotat	Exit and entry from Toulon (A50)
1.000 mi = 1.609 km; 1.000 km = 0.621 mi
