= Route nationale 8 =

Road in France

The Route nationale 8, or RN 8, was a trunk road (nationale) in southeast France between Aix-en-Provence and Toulon.

== Reclassification ==
In a recent reorganisation of the French road network (2005) the RN8 has been downgraded and re-numbered as the RD8n in Bouches-du-Rhône and RDN8 in Var.

== Route ==
=== Aix-en-Provence to Marseille (0 km to 23 km) ===
The road begins at a junction with the RN 7 in Aix as the Avenue Pierre Brossolette and heads South crossing the A8 autoroute as well as the A51 autoroute heading towards the Chaine de l'Étoile (670 m). The road crosses the A7 autoroute before entering the north west suburbs of Marseille reaching the water front in the city centre.

=== Marseille to Toulon (23 km to 84 km) ===
The RN 8 heads East alongside the A50 autoroute to Aubagne passing north of Mt. St. Cyr (609 m). The road heads Southeast below the Massif de la Sainte Baume and over the Col de l'Ange (218 m). The road then passes the Parc d'OK Corral and motor racing circuit Circuit du Castellet Paul Ricard. The road turns South past Le Beausset and the Gorges de Saint Anne as well as the le Gros Cerveau.

The road then enters La Seyne-sur-Mer and Western Toulon running along the waterfront and harbour. The road ends at the start of the A57 autoroute and the RN 97 and RN 98.
