= A8 autoroute =

Controlled-access motorway in France

A8 autoroute
- La Provençale

Route information
- Part of E74 / E80
- Maintained by ASF; ESCOTA
- Length: 224 km (139 mi)
- Existed: 1961–present

Major junctions
- West end: E80 / E714 / A 7 in Coudoux

- E712 / A 51 in Aix-en-Provence; A 52 in Châteauneuf-le-Rouge; A 57 in Le Cannet-des-Maures
- East end: E80 / A 10 in Menton (Italian)

Location
- Country: France

Highway system
- Roads in France; Autoroutes; Routes nationales

The A8 autoroute (French: Autoroute A8), also known simply as the A8 or by its nickname La Provençale ([la pʁɔvɑ̃sal], lit. 'The Provençal'), is an autoroute (motorway) in Southern France. It runs from the A7 ahead of Aix-en-Provence to the Italian border at Menton through the French Riviera, serving Cannes, Antibes, Nice, as well as Monaco. It is 224 kilometres (139 mi) long; after the Italian border, it connects with the Autostrada A10 towards Genoa.

== Route ==
The A8 is an extension of the A7 starting to the west of Aix-en-Provence at La Fare-les-Oliviers. The road passes through the Departments of Bouches-du-Rhône, Var and Alpes-Maritimes. It serves the towns of Aix-en-Provence, Fréjus, Saint-Raphaël, Mandelieu-la-Napoule, Cannes, Antibes, Nice, Monaco, and Menton before crossing the border where it becomes the A10 in Italy. It crosses the mountain ranges of Sainte-Baume and of Maures between Aix-en-Provence and Fréjus and the Massif de l'Esterel between Saint-Raphaël and Cannes. Following the Grande Corniche the road offers panoramas of the sea between Nice and Menton.

While the route now starts to the west of Aix-en-Provence, according to the 3rd edition (1973) of the Michelin Atlas des autoroutes de France, the A8 used to start just west of Coudoux. Indeed, the toll fees were listed as being 2FF from Coudoux to Aix-en-Provence in 1973.

== Capacity ==
- 2x3 lanes from Coudoux (the junction with the A7 to La Barque (junction with the A52).
- 2x2 lanes from La Barque to Saint-Maximin-la-Sainte-Baume (being expanded to 2x3 lanes) increases to 2x3 lanes at Cagnes-sur-Mer.
- 2x4 lanes from Cagnes-sur-Mer to Saint-Laurent-du-Var (the road enters the Nice agglomeration).
- 2x2 lanes in the section through the southern Alps from Nice Saint-Augustin to the frontier with Italy, this section has 15 tunnels. There is a speed limit of 90 km/h in the tunnels (70 km/h for large vehicles).

== Traffic ==
The road has heavy traffic all year round and is especially congested in July and August, in particular around Antibes and Nice. As a result, traffic-management schemes have been adopted between Var to Nice-West similar to those on the Péripherique in Paris. The autoroute is regularly closed on the Nice-Menton section as a result of rock falling onto the carriageways. The sections crossing the Maures and L'Esterel mountains are at risk from forest fires in summer.

== Opening dates of the A8 ==
- 1956: Creation of Escota, a company to be in charge of all the sections from Aix-en-Provence to the Italian Frontier.
- 1961: Opening of the toll sections of Fréjus through Mandelieu-la-Napoule to Cagnes-sur-Mer (exit 46).
- 1969: Opening of the toll section from Roquebrune to the Italian frontier (initially only one carriageway and for lightweight vehicles. Then, in 1970, both carriageways were opened).
- 1971–1974: Staged opening of the sections between Aix-en-Provence and Fréjus.
- 1976: Opening of the section between Cagnes-sur-Mer and Roquebrune (partly one carriageway only—the doubling of some tunnels was completed as late as 1988).

== List of junctions ==
Region	Department	Junction	Destinations	Notes
Provence-Alpes-Côte d'Azur	Bouches-du-Rhône	A7 - A8 + 28 : Coudoux	Lyon, Avignon, Nîmes, Barcelone, Salon-de-Provence (A54), Berre-l'Étang, Marignane	
Provence-Alpes-Côte d'Azur	Bouches-du-Rhône	A7 - A8 + 28 : Coudoux	Coudoux, La Fare-les-Oliviers	Entry and exit from Italy
Provence-Alpes-Côte d'Azur	Bouches-du-Rhône	Aire de Ventabren		
Provence-Alpes-Côte d'Azur	Bouches-du-Rhône	29 : Aix - ouest	Aix-en-Provence - centre, Jas-de-Bouffan, Encagnane, Les Milles	Entry and exit from Lyon
Provence-Alpes-Côte d'Azur	Bouches-du-Rhône	A51 & RN 296 - A8	Marseille - nord (A7), Marignane, Les Milles, Aix T.G.V, Marignane	
Provence-Alpes-Côte d'Azur	Bouches-du-Rhône	A51 & RN 296 - A8	Gap (A51), Aix-en-Provence - Encagnane, Avignon	
Provence-Alpes-Côte d'Azur	Bouches-du-Rhône	30/30a/30b : Aix - Pont-de-l'Arc	Aix-en-Provence - centre, Les Milles, Luynes, Facultés, Val-de l'Arc	
Provence-Alpes-Côte d'Azur	Bouches-du-Rhône	31 : Aix - Val-Saint-André	Aix-en-Provence, Fréjus, Saint-Raphaël, Aubagne	
Provence-Alpes-Côte d'Azur	Bouches-du-Rhône	32 : Cannet-de-Meyreuil	Fuveau, Trets, Rousset, Meyreuil, Gardanne	
Provence-Alpes-Côte d'Azur	Bouches-du-Rhône	Péage de La Barque		
Provence-Alpes-Côte d'Azur	Bouches-du-Rhône	A52 - A8	Aubagne, Toulon, Marseille - centre (A50)	
Provence-Alpes-Côte d'Azur	Bouches-du-Rhône	Aire de Rousset (Westbound); Aire de la Sainte-Victoire (Eastbound)		
Provence-Alpes-Côte d'Azur	Var	33 : Pourrières	Rousset, Pourrières, Trets	
Provence-Alpes-Côte d'Azur	Var	Aire de Saint-Hilaire (Westbound); Aire de Barcelone (Eastbound)		
Provence-Alpes-Côte d'Azur	Var	34 : Saint-Maximin	Barjols, Tourves, Saint-Maximin-la-Sainte-Baume, Auriol	
Provence-Alpes-Côte d'Azur	Var	Aire de Cambarette (Westbound); Aire des Terrasses de Provence (Eastbound)		
Provence-Alpes-Côte d'Azur	Var	35 : Brignoles	Le Val, Brignoles	
Provence-Alpes-Côte d'Azur	Var	Aire de Candumy (Westbound); Aire de Roudaï (Eastbound)		
Provence-Alpes-Côte d'Azur	Var	A57 - A8	Toulon, Hyères (A570), La Garde-Freinet, Vidauban, Le Luc, Le Cannet-des-Maures	
Provence-Alpes-Côte d'Azur	Var	Aire de Provence Verdon (Westbound); Aire de Vidauban sud (Eastbound)		
Provence-Alpes-Côte d'Azur	Var	36 : Le Muy	Saint-Tropez, Draguignan, Sainte-Maxime, Roquebrune-sur-Argens, Vidauban, Les Arcs, Le Muy	
Provence-Alpes-Côte d'Azur	Var	Aire de Jas Pellicot (Westbound); Aire du Canaver (Eastbound)		
Provence-Alpes-Côte d'Azur	Var	37 : Puget-sur-Argens	Fréjus - ouest, Puget-sur-Argens, Roquebrune-sur-Argens	
Provence-Alpes-Côte d'Azur	Var	Péage du Capitou		
Provence-Alpes-Côte d'Azur	Var	38 : Fréjus	Fréjus - centre, Saint-Raphaël	
Provence-Alpes-Côte d'Azur	Var	Aire du Reyran (Westbound ; reserved for heavy goods vehicles)		
Provence-Alpes-Côte d'Azur	Var	Aire de l'Estérel (Westbound)		
Provence-Alpes-Côte d'Azur	Var	39 : Les Adrets	Fayence, Les Adrets-de-l'Estérel	
Provence-Alpes-Côte d'Azur	Alpes-Maritimes	40 : Mandelieu	Théoule-sur-Mer, Mandelieu-la-Napoule - centre	
Provence-Alpes-Côte d'Azur	Alpes-Maritimes	41 : La Bocca	Mandelieu - est, Aéroport Cannes-Mandelieu, Cannes - centre, Cannes - ouest	
Provence-Alpes-Côte d'Azur	Alpes-Maritimes	42 : Mougins	Grasse, Le Cannet, Cannes - centre, Mougins	
Provence-Alpes-Côte d'Azur	Alpes-Maritimes	Aire du Piccolaret (Westbound)		
Provence-Alpes-Côte d'Azur	Alpes-Maritimes	Péage d'Antibes		
Provence-Alpes-Côte d'Azur	Alpes-Maritimes	44 : Antibes	Antibes, Sophia Antipolis, Vallauris, Golfe-Juan, Juan-les-Pins	
Provence-Alpes-Côte d'Azur	Alpes-Maritimes	46 : Villeneuve-Loubet - Plage	Bouches du Loup, Villeneuve-Loubet	
Provence-Alpes-Côte d'Azur	Alpes-Maritimes	Aire des Bréguières nord (Westbound); Aire de la Côte d'Azur (Eastbound)		
Provence-Alpes-Côte d'Azur	Alpes-Maritimes	47 : Villeneuve-Loubet / Cagnes-sur-Mer - ouest	Villeneuve-Loubet - centre, Vence, Cagnes-sur-Mer	
Provence-Alpes-Côte d'Azur	Alpes-Maritimes	48 : Cagnes-sur-Mer - est	Vence, Cagnes-sur-Mer	Entry and exit from Italy
Provence-Alpes-Côte d'Azur	Alpes-Maritimes	49 : Saint-Laurent-du-Var	Saint-Laurent-du-Var	
Provence-Alpes-Côte d'Azur	Alpes-Maritimes	50 : Nice - ouest	Nice - centre, Promenade des Anglais	Entry and exit from Aix
Provence-Alpes-Côte d'Azur	Alpes-Maritimes	51 : Nice - Aéroport	M.I.N., Centre Administratif, Aéroport de Nice-Côte d'Azur, Nice - Saint-Augustin	
Provence-Alpes-Côte d'Azur	Alpes-Maritimes	51.1 : Carros	Carros, Digne-les-Bains, Grenoble	
Provence-Alpes-Côte d'Azur	Alpes-Maritimes	Péage de Nice - Saint-Isidore		
Provence-Alpes-Côte d'Azur	Alpes-Maritimes	52 : Nice - Saint-Isidore	Carros, Nice, Stade de Nice, Grenoble, Digne-les-Bains	
Provence-Alpes-Côte d'Azur	Alpes-Maritimes	54 : Nice - Quartier nord	Nice	
Provence-Alpes-Côte d'Azur	Alpes-Maritimes	55 : Nice - est	Nice - L'Ariane, Port, Saint-André-de-la-Roche, La Trinité	
Provence-Alpes-Côte d'Azur	Alpes-Maritimes	E80 / A 8 becomes E74 / E80 / A 8		
Provence-Alpes-Côte d'Azur	Alpes-Maritimes	56 : Monaco (A500)	Monaco - centre, Cap d'Ail	
Provence-Alpes-Côte d'Azur	Alpes-Maritimes	Péage de La Turbie		
Provence-Alpes-Côte d'Azur	Alpes-Maritimes	57 : La Turbie	La Turbie, Èze, Roquebrune-Cap-Martin	
Provence-Alpes-Côte d'Azur	Alpes-Maritimes	Aire de Via Julia Augusta (Westbound)		
Provence-Alpes-Côte d'Azur	Alpes-Maritimes	58 : Beausoleil / Monaco - est + Aire de la Riviera Française (Eastbound)	Monaco - est, La Turbie - nord, Roquebrune-Cap-Martin, Beausoleil	
Provence-Alpes-Côte d'Azur	Alpes-Maritimes	59 : Menton	Menton, Sospel	
French - Italian Border ; E80 / A 8 becomes E80 / A 10
1.000 mi = 1.609 km; 1.000 km = 0.621 mi
