= Bretelle =

Bretelle is a French surname. Notable people with the surname include:

- Lucas Bretelle (born 2002), French footballer
- Marthe Bretelle (born 1936), French discus thrower and shotput athlete

== See also ==
- List of bretelle, diramazioni and raccordi autostradali – Types of Italian motorways
- Bretelle de Monaco – French Motorway near Monaco
