= A50 =

A50, A.50 or A-50 may refer to:

== Aviation ==
- Beriev A-50, a Russian airborne early warning aircraft
- Fiat A.50, a 1928 Italian seven-cylinder, air-cooled radial engine for aircraft
- A-50 Golden Eagle, a light attack variant of the South Korean KAI T-50 Golden Eagle advanced trainer aircraft
- Junkers A50, a German sports plane of 1930s
- A-50, a caesium-containing additive in the fuel JP-7
- Aerozine 50, a type of rocket fuel

== Roads ==
- A50 highway (Canada), a road in Québec connecting the Outaouais and National Capital region and the Greater Montreal area
- A50 road (England), a road connecting Warrington and Leicester
- A50 motorway (France), a road connecting Marseille and Toulon
- A50 road (Northern Ireland), a road connecting Portadown and Newcastle in Northern Ireland
- A50 motorway (Netherlands), a road connecting Eindhoven and Zwolle
- A50 highway (Spain), a road connecting Salamanca and Ávila
- A50 autostrada (Poland), a planned motorway being part of new Warsaw bypass

== Other uses ==
- Queen's Pawn Game (Encyclopaedia of Chess Openings code: A50)
- FTSE China A50 Index, a stock exchange index
- Article 50 of the Treaty on European Union
  - United Kingdom invocation of Article 50 of the Treaty on European Union
- Austin A50, a UK medium sized saloon car 1954-57
- Samsung Galaxy A50, smartphone released in 2019
- A-series light bulb of diameter 50 mm

== See also ==
- List of highways numbered 50
- A-50/FA-50/TA-50 variants of the KAI T-50 Golden Eagle
- A500 (disambiguation)
- A5 (disambiguation)
