= List of highways numbered 50 =

The following highways are numbered 50:

== International ==
- E50 European route E50

== Brazil ==
- BR-050

== Canada ==
- Alberta Highway 50
- Manitoba Highway 50
- Newfoundland and Labrador Route 50
- Ontario Highway 50 (Also referred to as
  Peel Regional Road 50 and York Regional Road 24 and Simcoe County Road 50)
- Quebec Autoroute 50

== China ==
- G50 Expressway

== Czech Republic ==
- I/50 Highway; Czech: Silnice I/50

== Finland ==
- Ring III (Kt 50)

== Greece ==
- EO50 road

== India ==
- NH 50, a National Highway between Pune and Nashik cities

== Ireland ==
- M50 motorway (Ireland)

== Israel ==
- Begin Expressway Highway 50 (Israel). A freeway in Jerusalem, Israel.

== Italy ==
- Autostrada A50

== Japan ==
- Japan National Route 50

== Jordan ==
- Highway 50

== Korea, South ==
- Yeongdong Expressway
- National Route 50

== Malaysia ==
- FT 50 Malaysia Federal Route 50

== New Zealand ==
- New Zealand State Highway 50

== Poland ==
- DK50, a national road functioning as a transit ring road around Warsaw
- motorway A50, planned motorway being a part of new ring road around Warsaw
- expressway S50, planned expressway being a part of new ring road around Warsaw

== Turkey ==
- O-50, a motorway in Turkey as the half ring road in Adana.

== United Kingdom ==
- British A50 (Leicester-Warrington)
- British M50 (Strensham-Ross on Wye)

== United States ==
- Interstate 50 (former proposal)
- U.S. Route 50
  - U.S. Route 50N (Kansas) (former)
  - U.S. Route 50N (Ohio–West Virginia) (former)
  - U.S. Route 50S (Kansas) (former)
  - U.S. Route 50S (Ohio–West Virginia) (former)
- Alabama State Route 50
- Arizona State Route 50 (never built)
- Arkansas Highway 50
- Colorado State Highway 50 (1923-1968) (former)
- Florida State Road 50
  - Florida State Road 50A
- Georgia State Route 50
  - Georgia State Route 50N (former)
  - Georgia State Route 50S (former)
- Hawaii Route 50
- Idaho State Highway 50
- Illinois Route 50
- Iowa Highway 50 (former)
- Kentucky Route 50 (former)
- Louisiana Highway 50
  - Louisiana State Route 50 (former)
- M-50 (Michigan highway)
- Minnesota State Highway 50
  - County Road 50 (Dakota County, Minnesota)
  - County Road 50 (Ramsey County, Minnesota)
- Mississippi Highway 50
- Missouri Route 50 (1922) (former)
- Montana Highway 50 (former)
- Nebraska Highway 50
  - Nebraska Link 50A
  - Nebraska Recreation Road 50B
  - Nebraska Recreation Road 50C
- Nevada State Route 50 (1935) (former)
- New Jersey Route 50
  - County Route 50 (Bergen County, New Jersey)
  - County Route 50 (Monmouth County, New Jersey)
  - County Route 50 (Ocean County, New Jersey)
- New Mexico State Road 50
- New York State Route 50
  - County Route 50 (Cattaraugus County, New York)
  - County Route 50 (Cayuga County, New York)
  - County Route 50 (Chautauqua County, New York)
  - County Route 50 (Dutchess County, New York)
  - County Route 50 (Erie County, New York)
  - County Route 50 (Greene County, New York)
  - County Route 50 (Monroe County, New York)
  - County Route 50A (Oneida County, New York)
  - County Route 50 (Onondaga County, New York)
  - County Route 50 (Ontario County, New York)
  - County Route 50 (Otsego County, New York)
  - County Route 50 (Putnam County, New York)
  - County Route 50 (Rensselaer County, New York)
  - County Route 50 (Schoharie County, New York)
  - County Route 50 (Suffolk County, New York)
    - County Route 50A (Suffolk County, New York)
    - County Route 50B (Suffolk County, New York)
    - County Route 50C (Suffolk County, New York)
  - County Route 50 (Ulster County, New York)
- North Carolina Highway 50
- North Dakota Highway 50
- Ohio State Route 50 (1923-1927) (former)
- Oklahoma State Highway 50
  - Oklahoma State Highway 50A
  - Oklahoma State Highway 50B
- Oregon Route 50 (former)
- Pennsylvania Route 50
- South Carolina Highway 50 (former, multiple)
- South Dakota Highway 50
- Tennessee State Route 50
- Texas State Highway 50
  - Texas State Highway Loop 50 (former)
  - Texas State Highway Spur 50 (former)
  - Farm to Market Road 50
  - Texas Park Road 50
- Utah State Route 50 (former, multiple)
- Virginia State Route 50 (former)
- Wisconsin Highway 50
- Wyoming Highway 50

== See also ==
- A50 roads

Preceded by 49	Lists of highways 50	Succeeded by 51
