= A507 autoroute =

Road in France

A507 autoroute
- 2ème rocade de Marseille
- 2nd Ring Road of Marseille

Route information
- Length: 9.7 km (6.0 mi)

Major junctions
- Orbital around Marseille
- A 7; A 50

Location
- Country: France

Highway system
- Roads in France; Autoroutes; Routes nationales

A507, also called 2ème rocade de Marseille, is a French autoroute that connects in Marseille from the freeway A50, in the east of the city to the northeast on the D4 road.

The first section between Frais Vallon and A50 was opened on 29 November 2016, while the second and final section was opened in October 2018.
