= A500 autoroute =

Road in France

A500 autoroute
- Bretelle de Monaco

Route information
- Maintained by Escota
- Length: 2 km (1.2 mi)
- Existed: 1992–present

Major junctions
- West end: E74 / E80 / A 8 in La Turbie

- East end: D 6007 in Cap d'Ail near Monaco

Location
- Country: France

Highway system
- Roads in France; Autoroutes; Routes nationales

The A500 autoroute, also known as Bretelle de Monaco, is a 2 km motorway, departing from A8 near Monaco exchange and arriving to the Moyenne Corniche near Cap d'Ail via monotube tunnel.

== Characteristics ==
- 3 lanes in 1 carriageway: 1 lane from west to east, 2 lanes from east to west
- maximum speed limit: 90 km/h

== List of junctions ==
Region	Department	km	mi	Junction	Destinations	Notes
Provence-Alpes-Côte d'Azur	Alpes-Maritimes	0.0	0.0	A8 - A500 ( 56 : Monaco - centre )	Nice, Toulon, Marseille	Westbound entry and exit
Provence-Alpes-Côte d'Azur	Alpes-Maritimes	1.0	0.6	57 : Laghet	La Turbie	Southbound entry and exit
Provence-Alpes-Côte d'Azur	Alpes-Maritimes	2.9	1.80	Èze - Village (RM 6007)	Nice, Èze	Southbound entry and exit
Provence-Alpes-Côte d'Azur	Alpes-Maritimes	3	1.86	RM 6007 - A500	Monaco, Cap-d'Ail	
1.000 mi = 1.609 km; 1.000 km = 0.621 mi
