= South Carolina Highway 50 =

South Carolina Highway 50 may refer to:

- South Carolina Highway 50 (1920s): a former state highway from Columbia to near Wallace
- South Carolina Highway 50 (1940s): a former state highway entirely in Rock Hill
