= Châteauneuf-le-Rouge =

Commune in Provence-Alpes-Côte d'Azur, France

- Commune
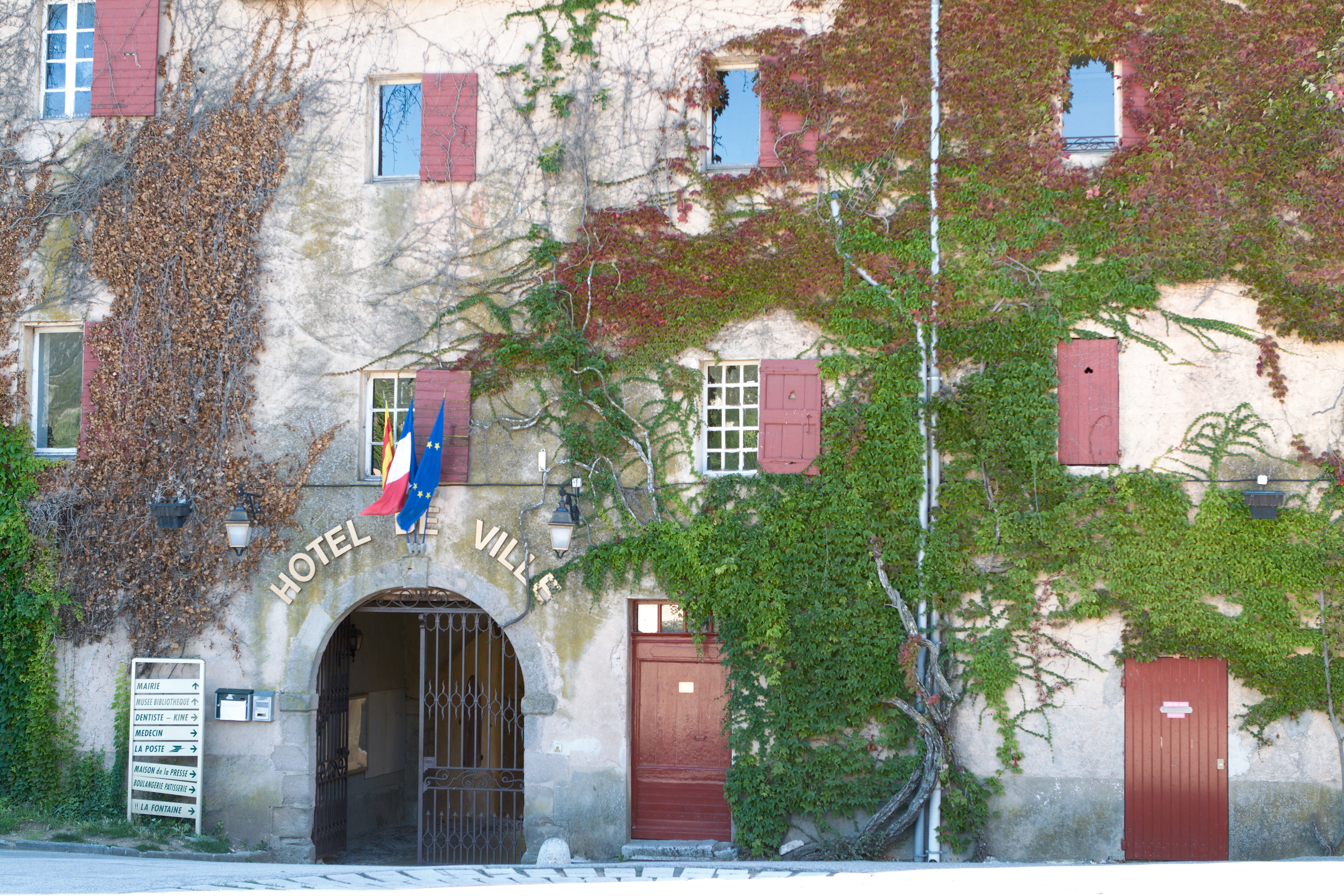
- Town hall

- Coat of arms
- Location of Châteauneuf-le-Rouge
- Location within France Location within Provence-Alpes-Côte d'Azur
- Coordinates: 43°29′26″N 5°34′14″E
- Country: France
- Region: Provence-Alpes-Côte d'Azur
- Department: Bouches-du-Rhône
- Arrondissement: Aix-en-Provence
- Canton: Trets
- Intercommunality: Aix-Marseille-Provence

Government
  - Mayor (2026–32): Michel Boulan
- Area^{1}: 13.15 km^{2} (5.08 sq mi)
- Elevation: 348 m (1,142 ft)
- Highest elevation: 511 m (1,677 ft)
- Lowest elevation: 179 m (587 ft)
- Population (2023): 2,376
  - Density: 180.7/km^{2} (468.0/sq mi)
- Time zone: UTC+01:00 (CET)
  - Summer (DST): UTC+02:00 (CEST)
- INSEE/Postal code: 13025 /13790
- ^{1} French Land Register data, which excludes lakes, ponds, glaciers > 1 km^{2} (0.386 sq mi or 247 acres) and river estuaries.

Châteauneuf-le-Rouge (French: [ʃɑtonœf lə ʁuʒ]; Occitan: Castèunòu lo Roge) is a commune in the Bouches-du-Rhône department in southern France.

== Population ==
Historical population

Year	Pop.	±% p.a.
1793	209	—
1800	249	+2.53%
1806	204	−3.27%
1821	367	+3.99%
1831	401	+0.89%
1836	407	+0.30%
1841	380	−1.36%
1846	378	−0.11%
1851	382	+0.21%
1856	382	+0.00%
1861	395	+0.67%
1866	359	−1.89%
1872	325	−1.64%
1876	289	−2.89%
1881	232	−4.30%
1886	158	−7.40%
1891	146	−1.57%
1896	120	−3.85%
1901	127	+1.14%

Year	Pop.	±% p.a.
1906	131	+0.62%
1911	138	+1.05%
1921	113	−1.98%
1926	100	−2.41%
1931	117	+3.19%
1936	114	−0.52%
1946	122	+0.68%
1954	112	−1.06%
1962	113	+0.11%
1968	165	+6.51%
1975	285	+8.12%
1982	1,071	+20.82%
1990	1,283	+2.28%
1999	1,869	+4.27%
2007	2,078	+1.33%
2012	2,130	+0.50%
2017	2,235	+0.97%
2023	2,376	+1.02%

Source: EHESS and INSEE (1968-2023)

== See also ==
- Communes of the Bouches-du-Rhône department
