= Utah State Route 50 =

Utah State Route 50 may refer to:

- U.S. Route 50 in Utah, legislatively designated as Route 50 on the two non-concurrent sections of the highway in Utah.
- Utah State Route 50 (pre-1977), a former state highway in Weber County.
- Utah State Route 50 (pre-1969), a former state highway in Carbon County.
