= Provence-Alpes-Côte d'Azur =

Administrative region of France

Provence-Alpes-Côte d'Azur Provença-Aups-Còsta d'Azur (Occitan)
- Region
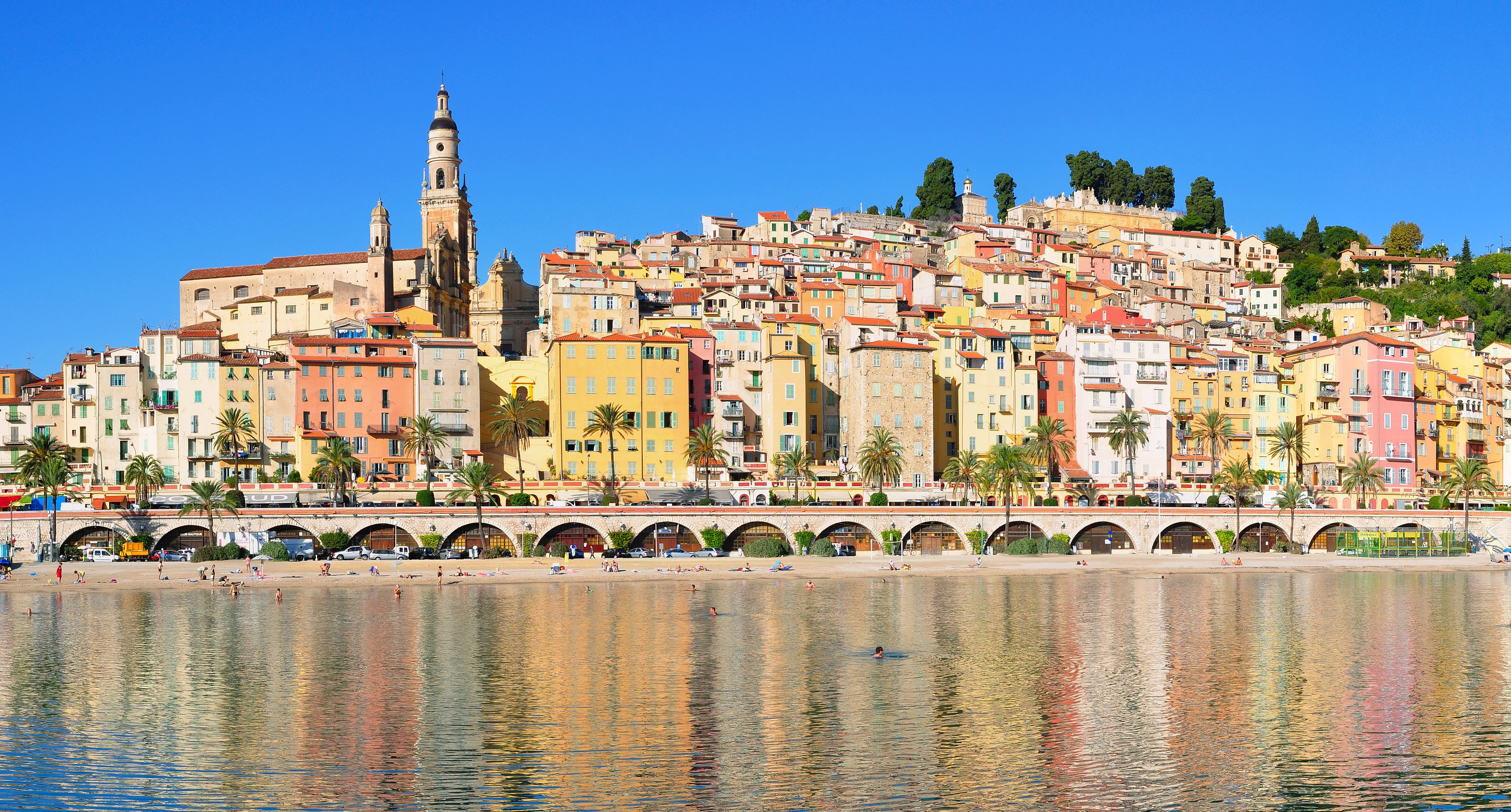
- View of Menton on the French Riviera

- Flag Coat of arms

- Coordinates: 44°00′N 6°00′E
- Country: France
- Prefecture: Marseille
- Departments: 6: Alpes-de-Haute-Provence (04); Alpes-Maritimes (06); Bouches-du-Rhône (13); Hautes-Alpes (05); Var (83); Vaucluse (84)

Government
  - President of the Regional Council: Renaud Muselier (DVD)

Area
  - Total: 31,400 km^{2} (12,100 sq mi)
  - Rank: 10th

Population (2023)
  - Total: 5,218,960
  - Density: 166/km^{2} (430/sq mi)
- Demonym: Provençals

GDP
  - Total: €217.942 billion (2024)
  - Per capita: €41,238 (2024)
- Time zone: UTC+01:00 (CET)
  - Summer (DST): CEST
- ISO 3166 code: FR-PAC
- NUTS Region: FR8
- Website: maregionsud.fr

Provence-Alpes-Côte d'Azur (Note: French pronunciation: [pʁɔvɑ̃s alp kot dazyʁ]; Occitan: Provença-Aups-Còsta d'Azur [pʀuˈvɛnsɔ ˈawps ˈkɔstɔ daˈzyʀ] or Provença-Alps-Còsta d'Azur [pʀuˈvɛnsɔ ˈalps ˈkɔstɔ daˈzyʀ]; Italian: Provenza-Alpi-Costa Azzurra; Monégasque: Prouvença-Alpe-Costa D'Azur. Literally 'Provence-Alps-Azure Coast', i.e. 'Provence-Alps-French Riviera'.) (commonly shortened to PACA), sometimes known as Région Sud, (Note: Occitan: Region del Sud. 'Southern Region'.) is one of the eighteen administrative regions of France, located at the far southeastern point of the mainland. The main prefecture and largest city is Marseille, France's second largest city proper after Paris and the 2nd largest urban area when combined with Aix-en-Provence with over 1.9 million residents.

== History ==
The region is roughly coterminous with the former French province of Provence, with the addition of the following adjacent areas: the former papal territory of Avignon, known as Comtat Venaissin; the former Sardinian-Piedmontese County of Nice annexed in 1860, whose coastline is known in English as the French Riviera and in French as the Côte d'Azur; and the southeastern part of the former French province of Dauphiné, in the French Alps. Previously known by the acronym PACA, the region adopted the name Région Sud as a commercial name/nickname in December 2017.

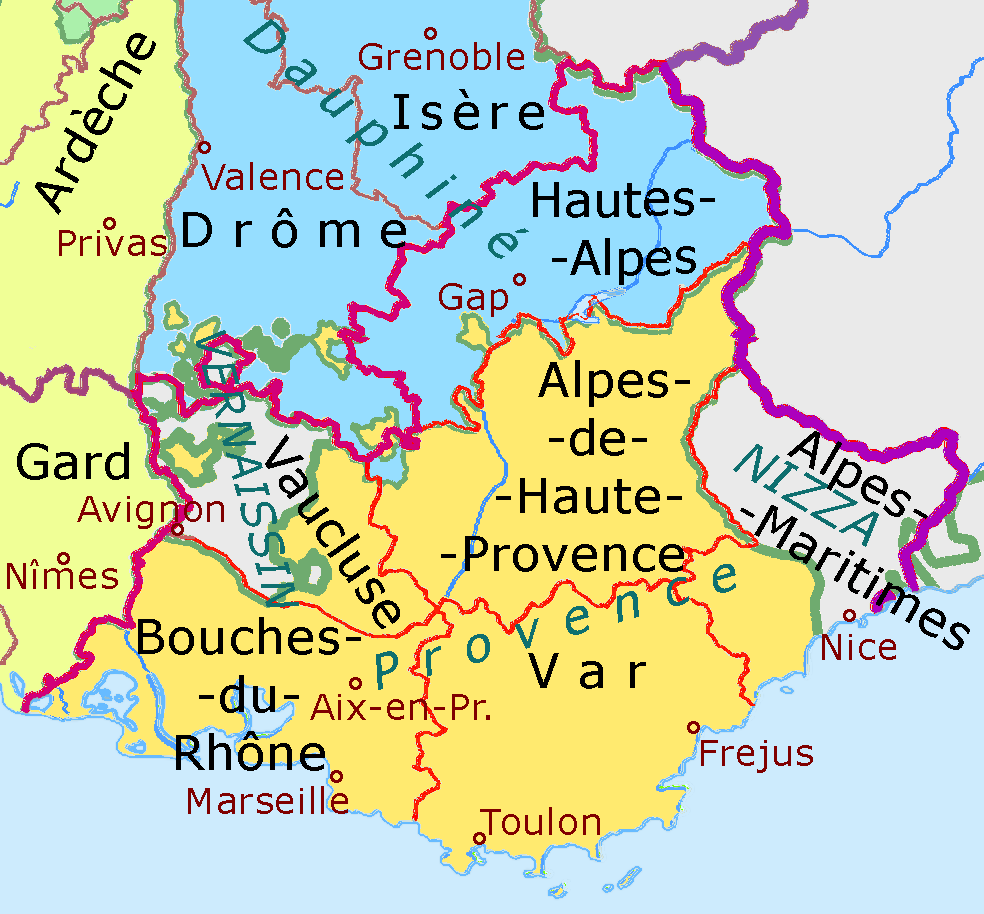
The region Provence-Alpes-Côte-d'Azur and its departments on the background of historical territories as diagramed.

== Geography ==
It encompasses six départements in Southeastern France: Alpes-de-Haute-Provence, Alpes-Maritimes, Bouches-du-Rhône, Hautes-Alpes, Var and Vaucluse. It is bounded to the east by the France–Italy border, to the south by the Mediterranean Sea and by the Principality of Monaco, to the north by Auvergne-Rhône-Alpes and to the west by Occitanie, with the Rhône marking its westernmost border. According to the 2015 population census, 5,007,977 people live in the region.

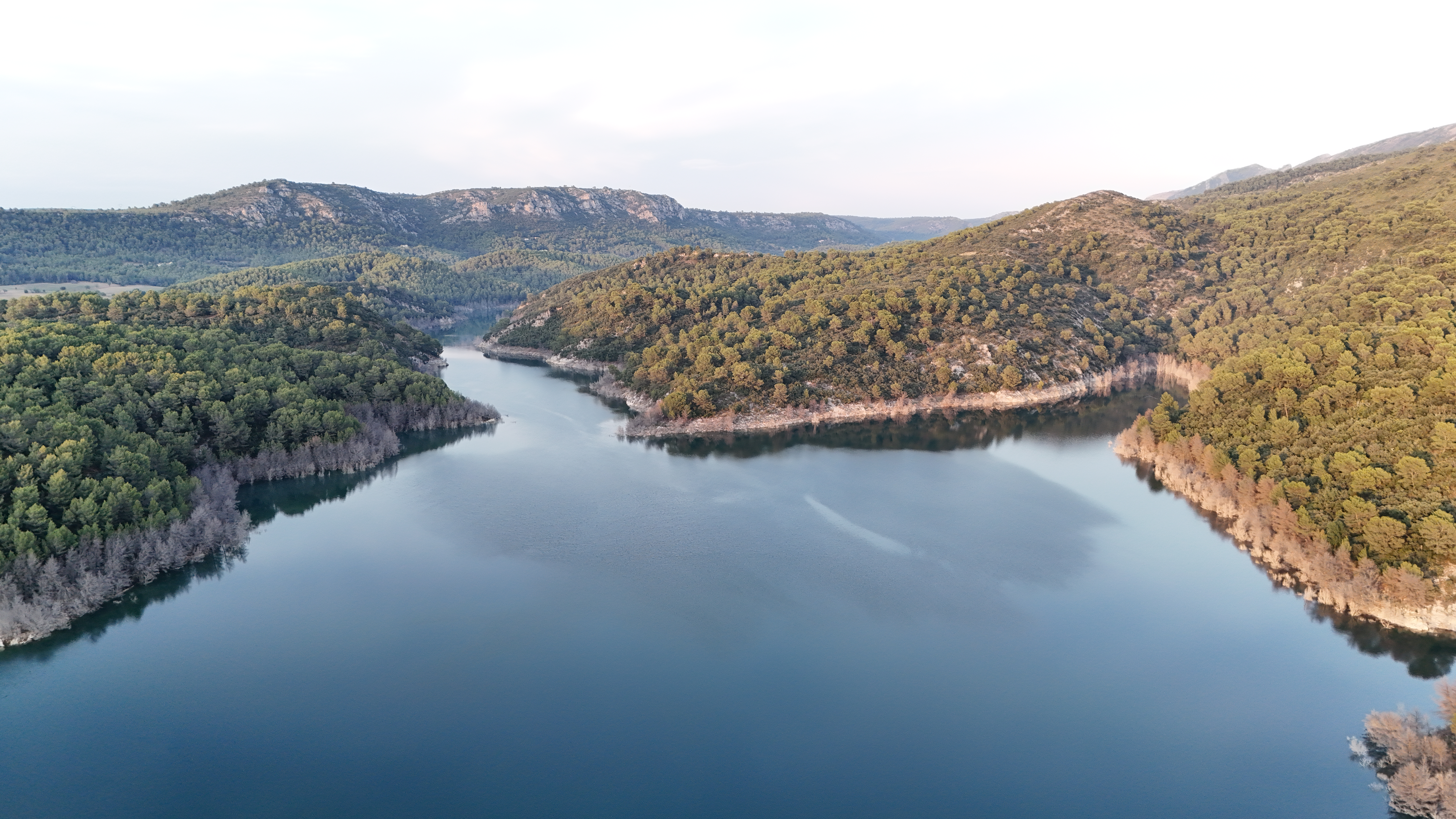
Bimont Dam near Aix-en-Provence

== Symbols ==
The region logotype displays the coat of arms created in the 1990s which combines the coats of arms of the old provinces making up Provence-Alpes-Côte d'Azur. The region's economy is the third largest in France, just behind Île-de-France and Auvergne-Rhône-Alpes.

== Demographics ==
=== Population ===
As of 2020, the population of the region was 5,098,666; Marseille and its metropolitan area is the most populous in the region with a city population of 870,321, an urban population of 1,618,479 and a metropolitan population of 1,879,601. Marseille is the second largest city in France after Paris, and has the third largest metropolitan population, behind those of Paris and Lyon respectively.

Nice is host to the second-largest population concentration in the region, with a city population of 344,875 and an urban population of 1,005,230, making it the fifth-most populous city in France.

=== Languages ===
The absolute majority of the population speaks French, but many regional and foreign languages are present in the region.

The 1999 Census, which included a complementary survey asking for the mother tongue of the respondents, gave results on the most spoken mother tongues in Provence after French:

- Provençal 5.2%
- Italian 4.4%
- Arabic 3.0%
- Spanish 2.8%
- Corsican 1.1%

=== Immigration ===
According to a 2009 study, nearly 40% of all newborns in Provence-Alpes-Côte d'Azur in 2007 had at least one parent of an immigrant background, mostly Italian, Spanish, Portuguese and Maghrebi. This is the second-highest rate after Île-de-France (Greater Paris), where the figure was around 56%. Since the 1960s, the region has been a major immigration centre from France and into France, mostly due to Northern French and to Mediterranean immigration from countries such as Portugal, Spain, Italy, Algeria, Tunisia and Morocco.

=== Departments ===
Provence-Alpes-Côte d'Azur is divided into 6 departments. These are Alpes-de-Haute-Provence, Hautes-Alpes, Alpes-Maritimes, Bouches-du-Rhône, Var and Vaucluse.

Code	Department	Area	Population	Prefecture	Sub-prefecture(s)	Population density
04	Alpes-de-Haute-Provence	6,944 km^{2} (2,681 sq mi)	161,241	Digne-les-Bains	Barcelonnette, Castellane and Forcalquier	23/km^{2} (60/sq mi)
05	Hautes-Alpes	5,549 km^{2} (2,142 sq mi)	139,554	Gap	Briançon	24/km^{2} (62/sq mi)
06	Alpes-Maritimes	4,299 km^{2} (1,660 sq mi)	1,084,428	Nice	Grasse	252/km^{2} (650/sq mi)
13	Bouches-du-Rhône	5,112 km^{2} (1,974 sq mi)	1,984,784	Marseille	Aix-en-Provence, Arles and Istres	385/km^{2} (1,000/sq mi)
83	Var	5,973 km^{2} (2,306 sq mi)	1,021,669	Toulon	Brignoles and Draguignan	196/km^{2} (510/sq mi)
84	Vaucluse	3,566 km^{2} (1,377 sq mi)	546,314	Avignon	Apt and Carpentras	151/km^{2} (390/sq mi)

== Major cities ==
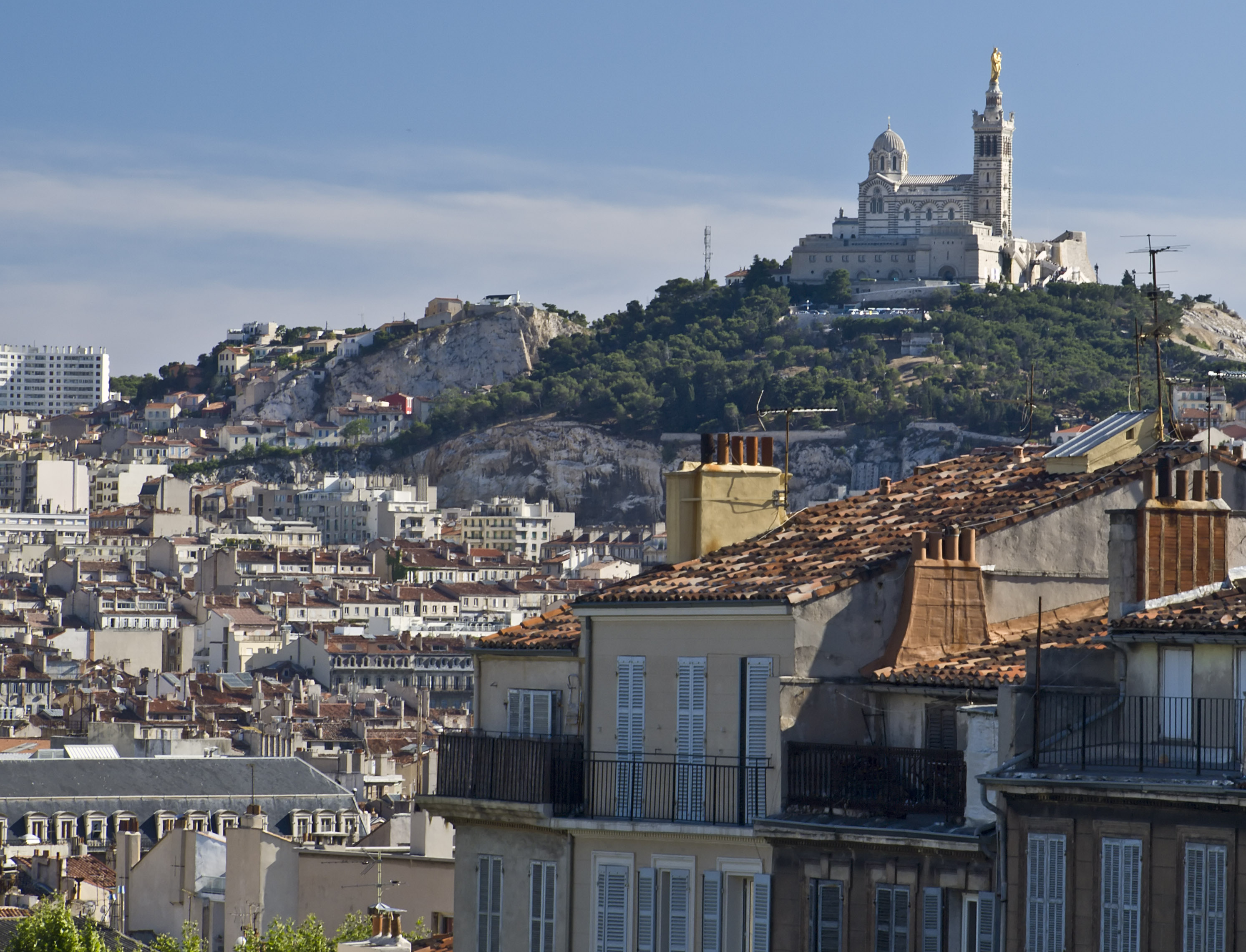
Marseille

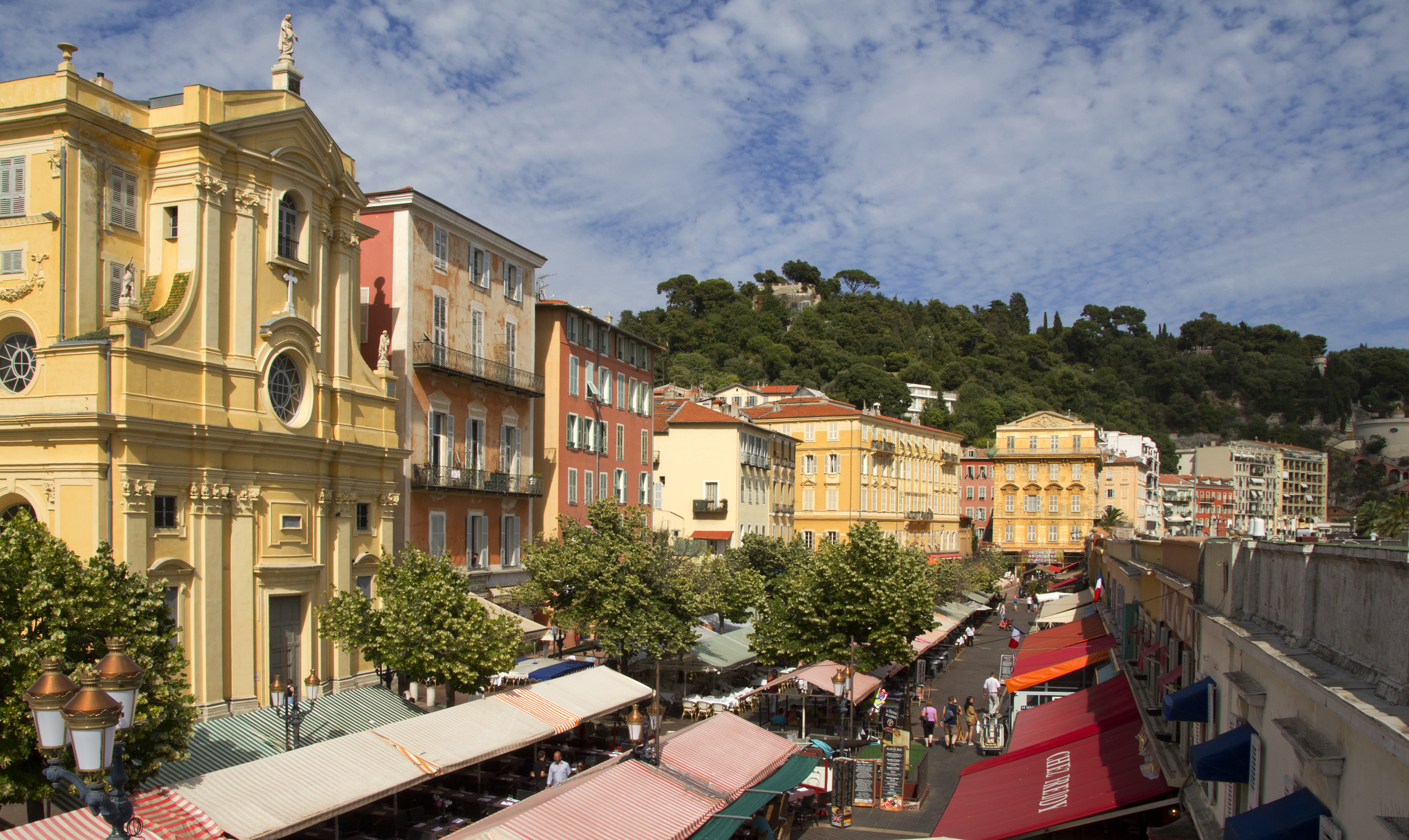
Nice

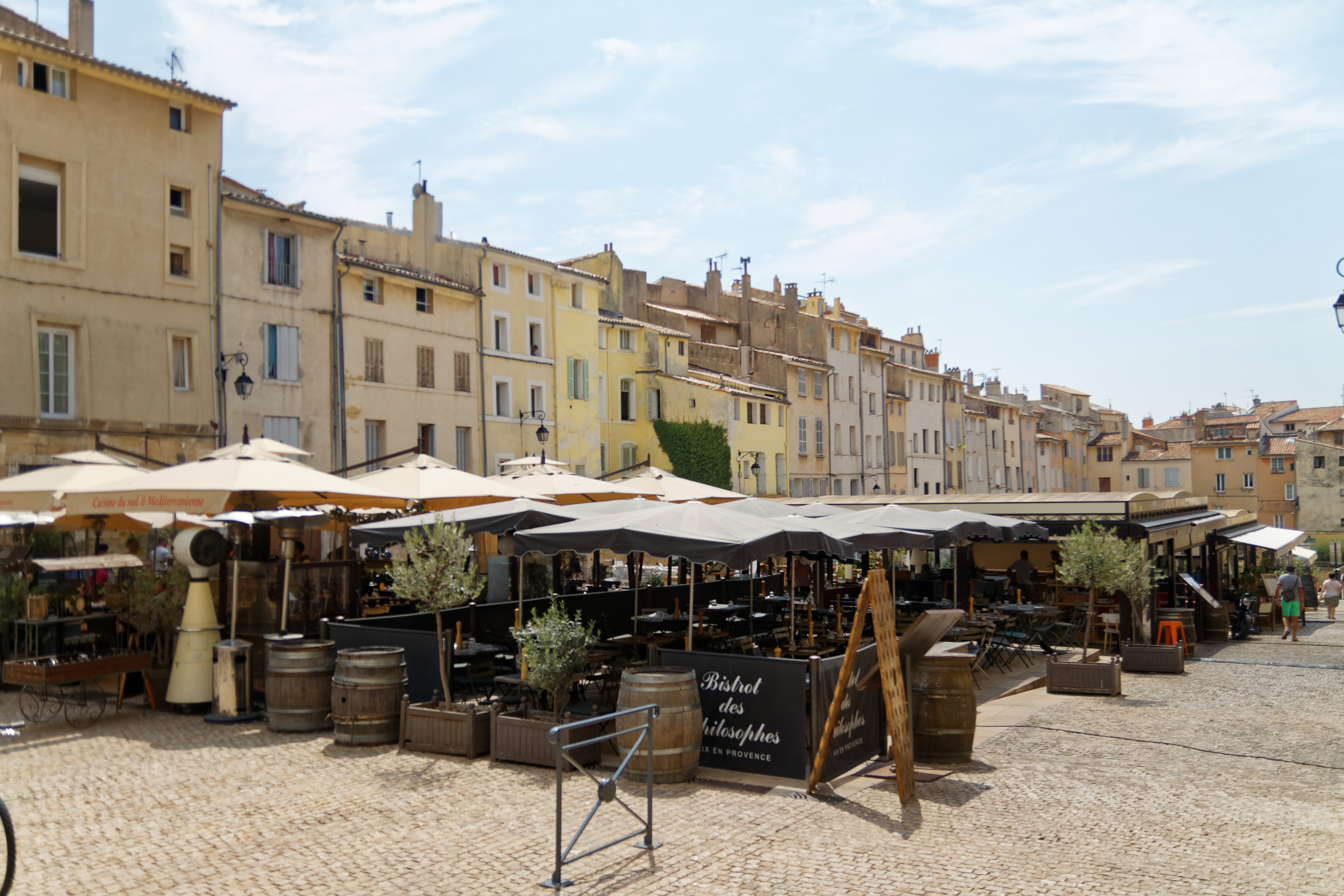
Aix-en-Provence

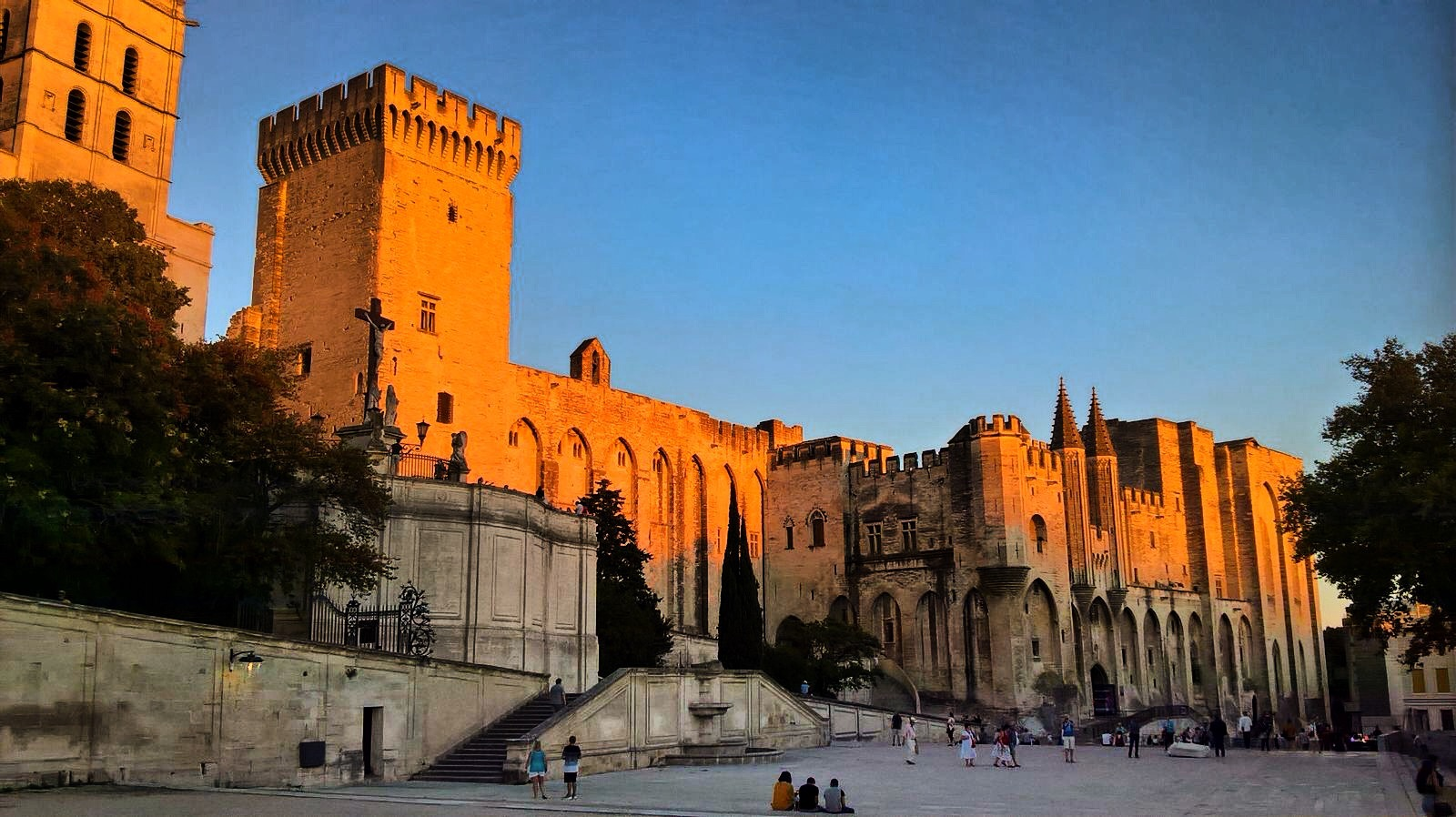
Avignon

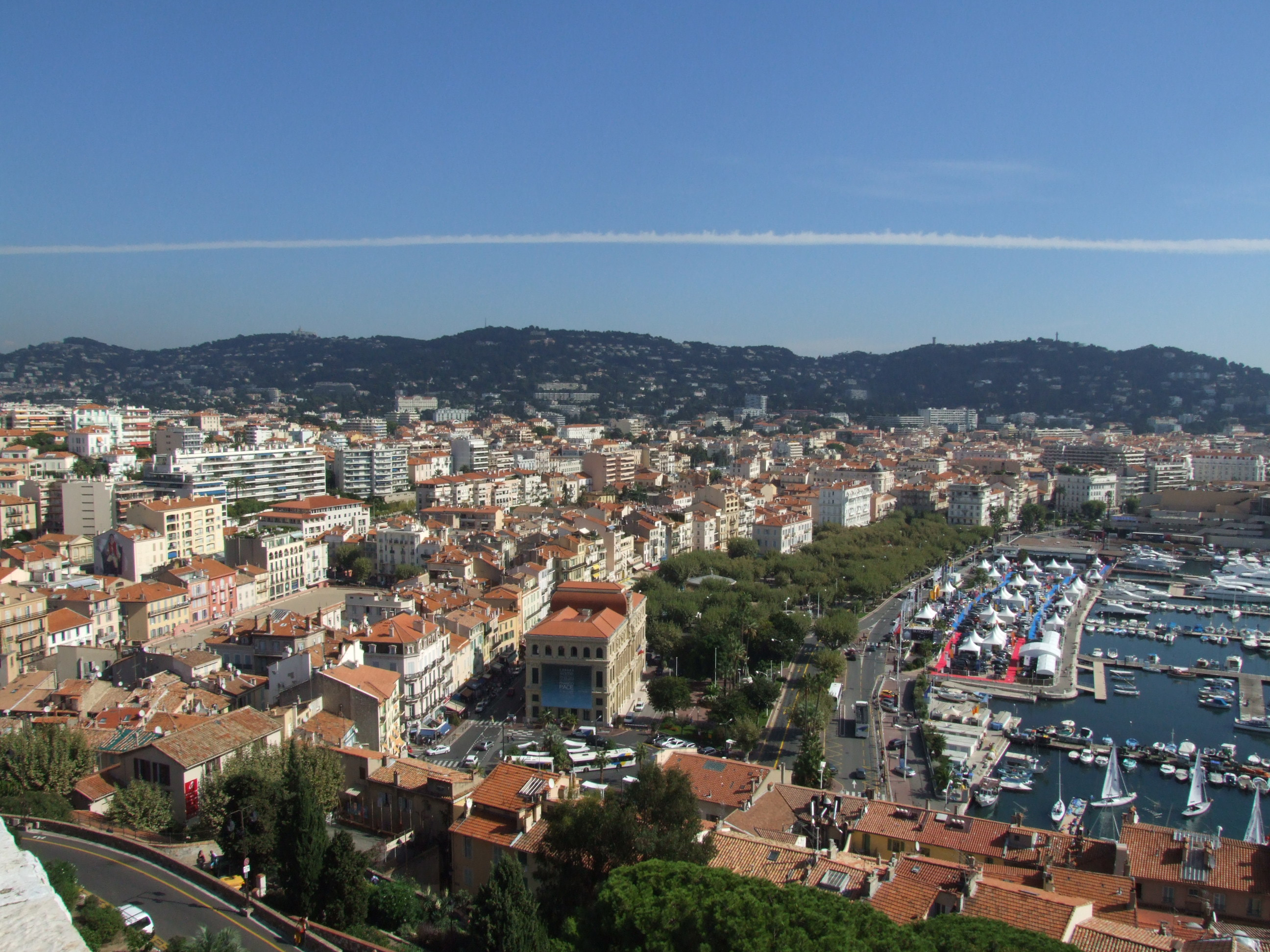
Cannes

The largest cities in the region are Marseille (regional prefecture), Nice, Toulon and Aix-en-Provence, each with a population exceeding 100,000 inhabitants at the 1999 census. After Marseille, Nice is the second most populous city in the region, with a city proper population of about 350,000 and an urban population exceeding 1 million.

Marseille has an urban area of 2 million inhabitants and is the largest and capital city of Provence-Alpes-Côte d'Azur region. It is also the second-most populated city in France, just behind Paris, and the city with the third-largest metropolitan population in France, behind Paris and Lyon, respectively.

Along with Nice and Marseille, the region is also made internationally popular with Cannes, a city that, despite its comparatively small size (population of 73,603 in 2012), hosts the annual Cannes Film Festival, which has highly popularized the region. In addition, Arles has become renowned as the city where Vincent van Gogh lived and painted 300 paintings.

Toulon is a large military harbour on the Mediterranean coast and is home to a French naval base. It is the capital of the Var department in the region. Also, Aix-en-Provence has long been a university town and, to this day, remains the most important educational centre in the region.

Below is a list of the most populated cities in the region along with their population (city proper) according to the most recent census:

- Aix-en-Provence – 142,743
- Antibes (includes Juan-les-Pins) – 76,994
- Arles – 52,729
- Aubagne – 46,423
- Avignon – 90,194
- Cannes – 73,603
- Draguignan – 38,258
- Fréjus – 52,389
- Grasse – 51,580
- Hyères – 56,275
- La Ciotat – 37,599
- La Seyne-sur-Mer – 64,903
- Le Cannet – 40,940
- Mandelieu-la-Napoule – 22,714
- Manosque – 22,333
- Marseille – 861,636
- Martigues – 76,471
- Mougins – 19,703
- Nice – 343,875
- Salon-de-Provence – 45,400
- Toulon – 167,729
- Villeneuve-Loubet – 14,427

== Geography ==
This region has a total area of 31,400 km^{2} (12,100 sq mi). It has a wide variety of landscapes, from the Alps mountains to plains, lakes such as the Gignoux Lake, and coastal areas like Nice and Marseille, which form the majority of the land area. The region has a Mediterranean coastline on the south, on which the majority of its population lives. It borders Italy (Liguria and Piedmont) to the east, Monaco (Fontvieille, La Colle, La Rousse, Larvotto, Les Moneghetti, Les Révoires, Saint Michel) in the south-east, and the French regions of Auvergne-Rhône-Alpes to the north and Occitanie to the west. The Rhône, Durance, Var and Arc rivers run through the region. The borders were unaffected by the 2016 French regional reforms.

This region is famous for the Côte d'Azur (French Riviera), which spans the coastal cities of Nice, Saint-Laurent-du-Var, Antibes, Juan-les-Pins, Cannes, Mandelieu-la-Napoule, Fréjus, Saint-Raphaël, Sainte-Maxime and Saint-Tropez; and on the Rhône river, the city of Avignon which is surrounded by medieval stone walls.

== Regional government and politics ==
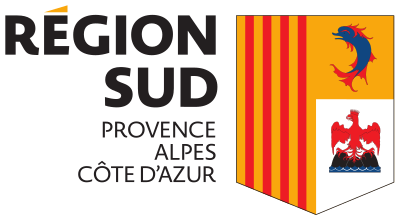
Regional logo

The Regional Council of Provence-Alpes-Côte d'Azur is the legislative body (assemblée délibérante) of the region. The President of the Regional Council has been Renaud Muselier formerly of The Republicans (LR) since 2017.

=== Political tendencies ===
In recent years, The Republicans have gained strong support in the region. Following the 2015 regional election, the party took control of the regional executive, which had been previously controlled by the Socialist Party (PS). Christian Estrosi succeeded Michel Vauzelle as President of the Regional Council. The 2015 election was also a show of force for the National Front (FN), led by Marion Maréchal-Le Pen, which garnered over 45% of the vote in the second round. The Socialist Party lost all representation at the regional level. The French Communist Party (PCF) historically had several strongholds in the region from the 1920s onward, including Aubagne, Draguignan, La Ciotat, Beausoleil, Martigues, Gardanne, Arles as well as some suburbs of Marseille, although not enough to win regional elections; the party usually received about 10% of the vote. In the 2002 presidential election, this declined to 4%. In 2007, it dropped below 2%. Nowadays the main competition in regional politics is between the right-wing The Republicans and the far-right National Rally (formerly National Front). In the second round of the 2021 regional election, The Republicans received 57.3% of the vote against the National Rally's 42.7% with a list led by Thierry Mariani. The Socialist Party, present in the first round on a joint list led by Europe Ecology – The Greens, failed again to win any seats. The 2022 presidential election marked the first time a far-right candidate won a majority of the vote in the second round in Provence-Alpes-Côte d'Azur. Marine Le Pen won a majority of the vote in three of the six departments (55.1% in Var, 52% in Vaucluse and 51.5% in Alpes-de-Haute-Provence); her respective scores in the remaining three (49.9% in Alpes-Maritimes, 47.9% in Bouches-du-Rhône and 44.9% in Hautes-Alpes) were superior to her national total (41.5%).

=== Presidential election results ===
In the second round of the last five presidential elections, Provence-Alpes-Côte d'Azur voted as follows, with the winner of the election indicated in italics:

Election	Regional winner	Regional runner-up
2022	Marine Le Pen (50.5%)	Emmanuel Macron (49.5%)
2017	Emmanuel Macron (55.5%)	Marine Le Pen (45.5%)
2012	Nicolas Sarkozy (57.6%)	François Hollande (42.4%)
2007	Nicolas Sarkozy (61.8%)	Ségolène Royal (38.2%)
2002	Jacques Chirac (72.3%)	Jean-Marie Le Pen (27.7%)

== Economy ==
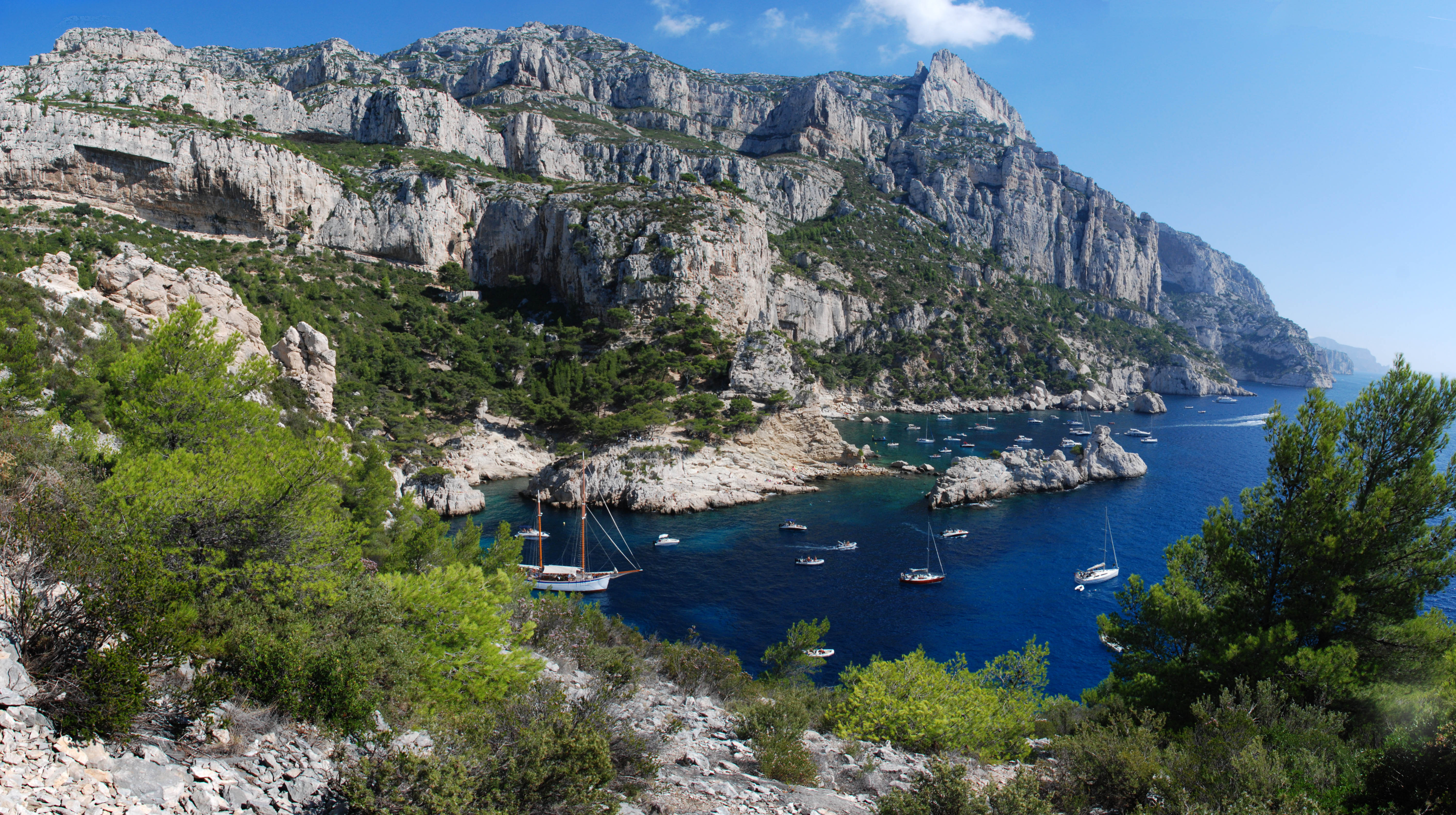
The Calanque de Sugiton in the 9th arrondissement of Marseille, part of Calanques National Park, a major tourist attraction in the region

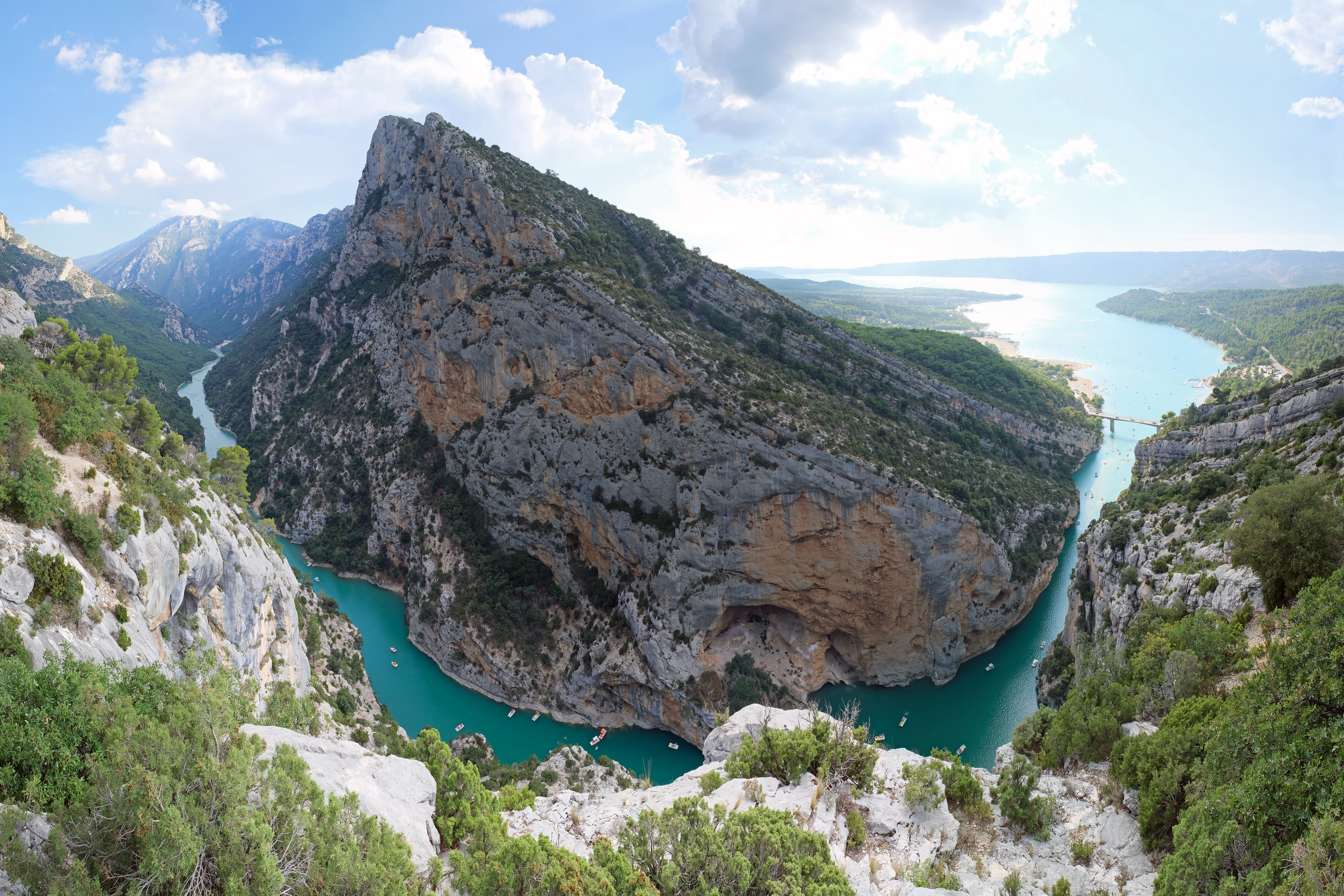
The Verdon Gorge on the border between Alpes-de-Haute-Provence and Var

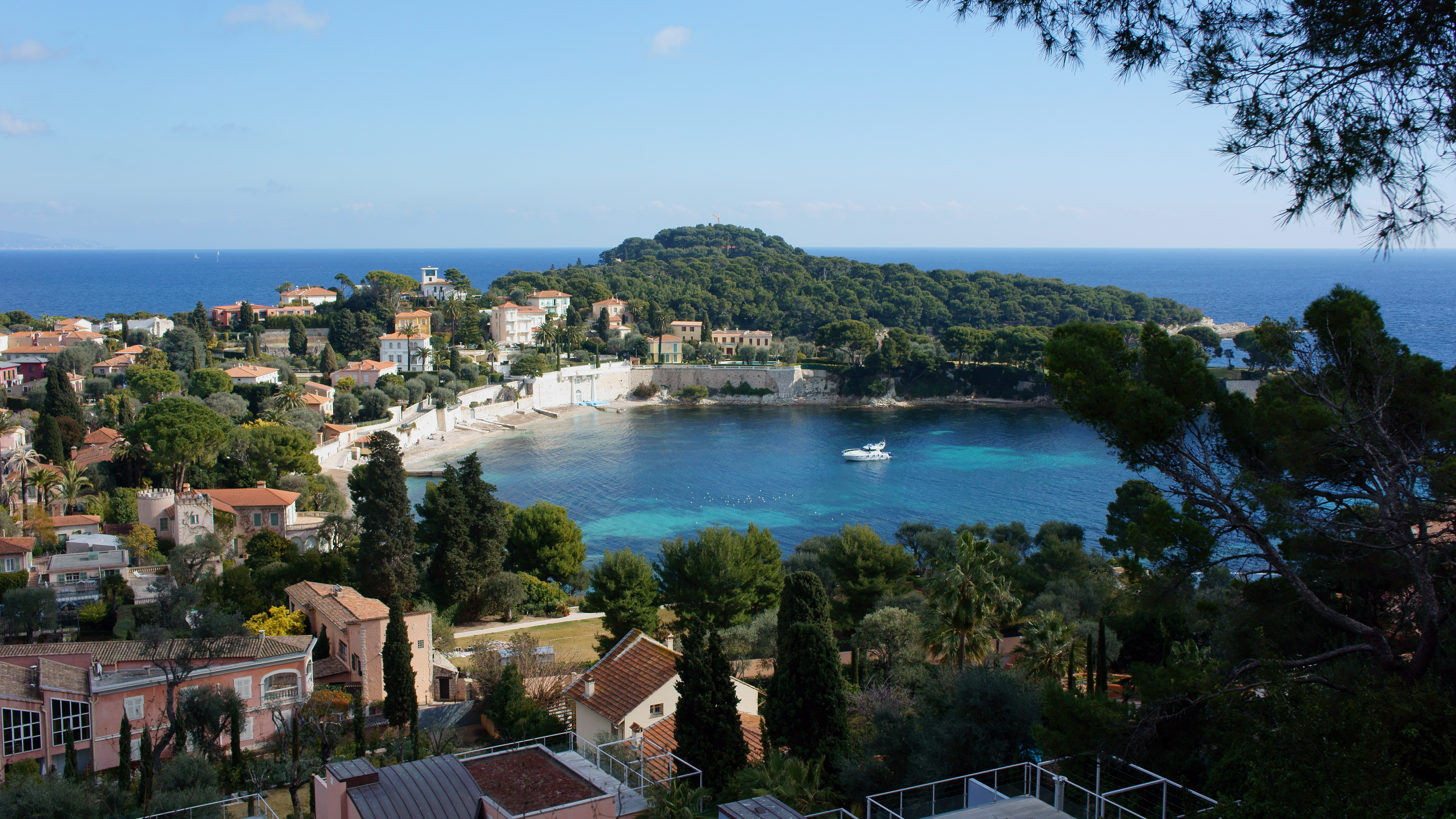
Saint-Jean-Cap-Ferrat, renowned resort near Nice, known for its Villa Ephrussi de Rothschild

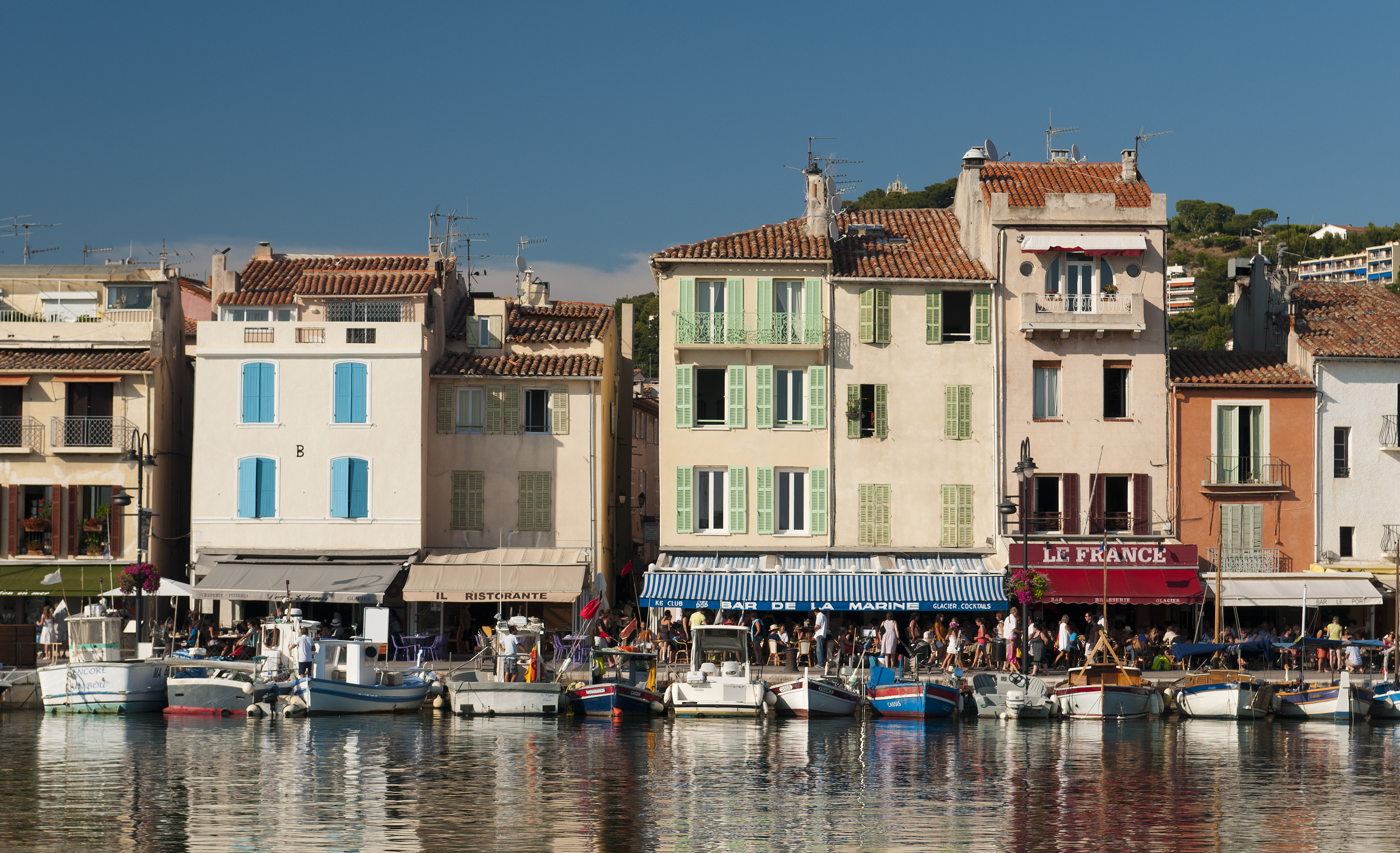
Cassis, typical Provençal seaside village, popular vacation destination

The regional income per capita is close to the French national average. Income inequality however is higher than in other regions: it is ranked the 2nd region most marked by inequalities after Île-de-France. The region is ranked fifth by GDP (as of 2016). Between 2007 and 2011, the region registered an average annual growth rate of 1.6% of GDP (Eurostat), close to the national average annual growth rate of 1.5%. Representing 7.2% of the national GDP over the period, the region is an important economic powerhouse.

In 2013, the region was responsible for 7.4% of national employment, with an employment rate of 60.9%. The region's employment success has a main characteristic: a higher concentration of elderly people than in the rest of France (respectively 27.1% and 24.1% in 2013). Its GDP in 2015 was €168.2 billion (US$190.5 billion) while its per capita GDP was €30,863 (US$34,950).

With more than 80% of regional employment in the service sector in 2016, the regional economy is mostly oriented towards service activities, above the national average of 75.8%. The sector grew between 2000 and 2010 (3.1% on annual average versus 2.1% in France). The region concentrates more on commercial activities than financial ones than the rest of France does; principally because of tourism. 34% of the labour force is employed in retail and trade, against 32% at the national level. Moreover, the sector strongly contributes to growth of added value (81.5% vs. 77.3% at the national level). The industrial sector (existing mainly through the Marseille-Fos Port), including construction, consists of 17.1% of regional employment (vs. 20.6% in the rest of France), and contributes to 9.3% of gross added value, 3.2 points below the French level.

Employment in the agricultural sector is lower than the national level (2.4% against 3.1%). However, it grew at a rate of 4.1% annually on average between 2000 and 2008, while the rest of the country saw its agricultural employment decline by 2.4%. According to the INSEE, the region is characterised by a strong presence of SMEs of less than 500 employees, which represent 91.2% of local businesses (higher than the national average of 90.9%). Retail activities and tourism explain these figures.

The region's economy is dependent on tourism like most coastal places but also a majority of its economy is dependent on coastal activities. PACA is the 3rd richest French region and ranks 19th on the European scale. Its prosperity is mainly thanks to its attractiveness in terms of tourism; it is indeed one of the world's favourite tourist destinations, welcoming about 34 million tourists every year. The service sector predominates and provides many good jobs. In 2009, the region was admittedly affected by the global economic crisis, albeit to a small extent. It is (after the Paris area) the 2nd French region with regards to business startups.

In addition to tourism, the region's economy includes sectors such as high technology, biotechnology, and microelectronics. The region has several universities, international schools, preparatory classes for specialist university courses, and engineering and business schools.

The region has a total GDP (2018) of €166.4 billion (US$188.7 bn), the sixth highest in France. It has a per capita GDP of €30,864 (US$34,994), slightly higher than the French average. According to a recent survey, a person living in Provence-Alpes-Côte d'Azur has an average annual income of about €37,489 (US$45,755).

The region has been part of the Alps–Mediterranean Euroregion since 10 July 2007.

== Culture ==
The region is one of the most visited of France, and has therefore many well-known museums, mostly in Marseille: the Museum of European and Mediterranean Civilisations, the Musée Cantini, the Musée Grobet-Labadié, the Marseille History Museum, the Musée des beaux-arts de Marseille, the Musée Regards de Provence, the Musée de la Faïence de Marseille and the Muséum d'histoire naturelle de Marseille are some of the tourist spots of the city. However, other museums are internationally recognised, like the Musée Matisse, the Musée d'art moderne et d'art contemporain, the Musée Marc Chagall, the Musée international d'Art naïf Anatole Jakovsky, the Musée des Beaux-Arts de Nice, the Musée National du Sport and the Muséum d'histoire naturelle de Nice.

== Transport ==
=== Airports ===
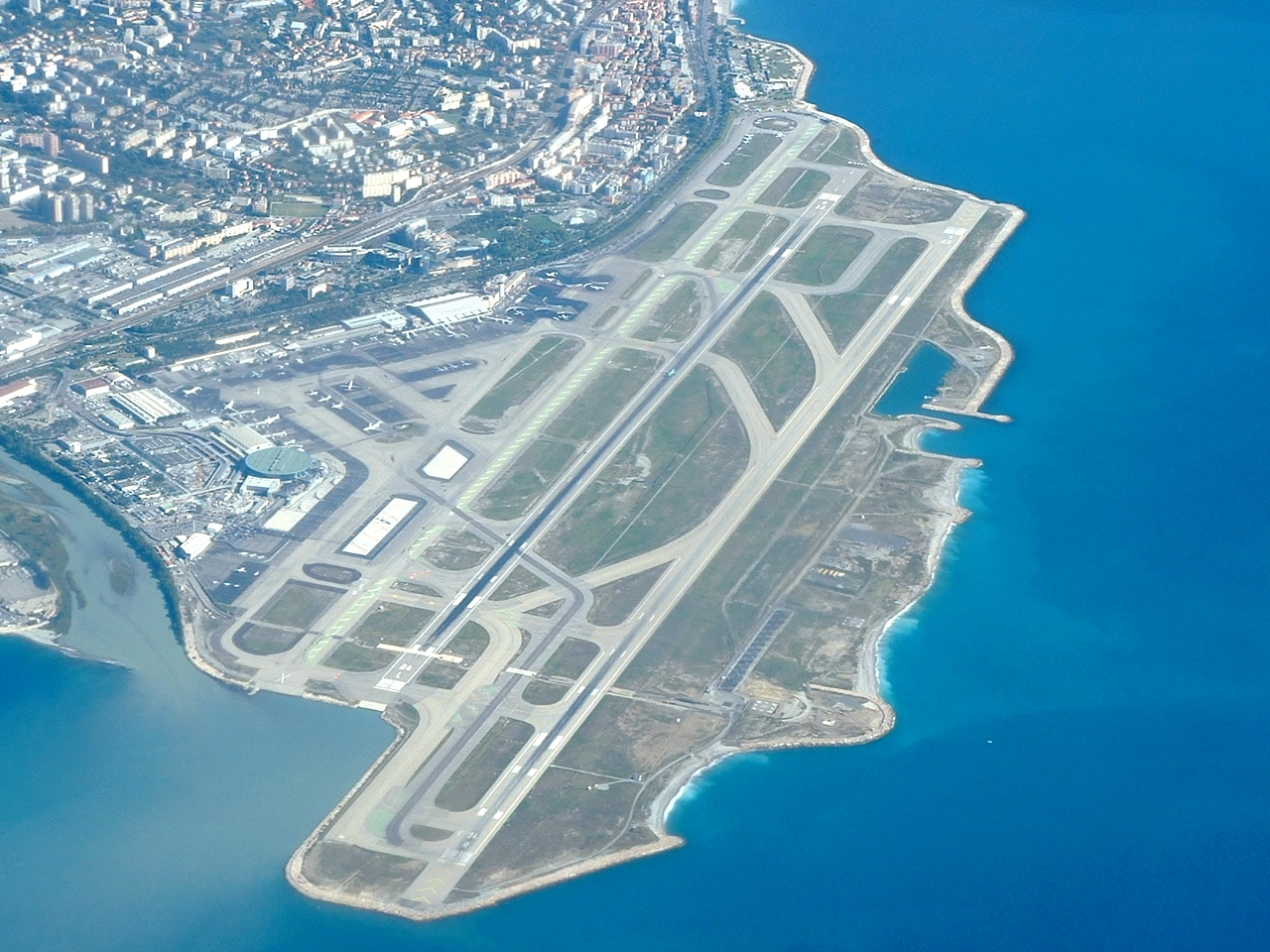
Nice Côte d'Azur Airport

Provence-Alpes-Côte d'Azur has two of the busiest airports in France: Nice Côte d'Azur Airport (ranking third nationally after Charles de Gaulle Airport and Orly Airport) and Marseille Provence Airport (ranking fifth nationally after Lyon–Saint-Exupéry Airport). Nice saw 14,485,423 people travelling through its airport in 2019, while 10,151,743 used Marseille to fly. As of 2019, the third-busiest airport in Provence-Alpes-Côte d'Azur is Toulon–Hyères Airport (507,199 passengers), ranking 27th nationally.

=== Motorways ===
The region is at the centre of a complex and dense motorway network, in the heart of Mediterranean coast. Motorways are operated by ASF, ESCOTA, SMTC, MPM (Marseille Metropolis) and DIR Med (State). In PACA, motorways have the particularity to serve the city centres of large cities, unlike other large cities of France. This is due to their comparatively early construction in relation to the motorways of France's other regions.

- A7 – Autoroute du Soleil "Motorway of the Sun" links the region to Lyon and on to the North of France. This motorway starts in central Marseille at the Porte d'Aix. The road widens at Septèmes Valleys and meets the A51. After a junction with the A55 and connecting highways A517, A551 and A552, the motorway crosses Vitrolles in 2x2x2 lanes. It serves Marseille Provence Airport and Aix-en-Provence TGV railway station. After 10 kilometres, the A7 passes the Berre-l'Étang petrochimical complex at a junction with the D8 highway. After this it meets the A8 Provençal motorway at La Fare-les-Oliviers. After the toll station at Lançon-de-Provence, the road meets the A54 motorway at Salon-de-Provence. The motorway continues along the Rhône and Durance to Avignon and Orange until Lyon.
- A8 – La Provençale, crosses the region from west to east to Italy. This motorway starts from the A7 at La Fare-les-Oliviers. The first part of free-road starts and cross Aix-en-Provence to be linked with A51 and N296 motorways. After the Palette Valley, the motorway arrives to the La Barque tool and the junction with the A52 to Aubagne, Marseille-Est and Toulon. Crossing the Var department with the A8/A57 junction at Le Luc, the A8 gets a mountain profile to cross the French Riviera: Cannes, Antibes, Nice. A connection is made with A500 motorway at La Turbie to serves the Principauty of Monaco. After Menton, the motorway cross the Italian border until Genoa.
- A50 – This motorway connects the east of Marseilles after the Prado-Carénage tooltunnel to Toulon. After crossing the Huveaune Valley and the South of Aubagne, the motorway goes near the coast to Toulon city center. The motorway crosses the city with a tunnel until A57. It is a suburban motorway.
- A51 – Autoroute du Val de Durance "Motorway of the Durance Valley". The motorway starts with the A7/A51/A517 junction in the north of Marseille between Plan-de-Campagne and Septèmes Valleys. 20 kilometres after, the motorway stops at the A8/A516/A51/N296 junction in the southern part of Aix-en-Provence. At Aix-Nord, the motorway restarts and goes to rural South Alps after Manosque. It ends near Tallard, at 20 km (12 mi) south from Gap.
- A52 – Grand Contournement de Marseille "Marseille Bypass". The motorway starts at the A8/A52 junction in Aix-Est (La Barque). It is a mountain 2x2 motorway built at 20 km (12 mi) around Marseille. After the A52/A520 junction and Pont de l'Étoile, it ends at Aubagne, connected with A501 and A50.
- A54 – Autoroute de la Crau "Crau Motorway". This motorway starts at the A7/A54 junction at Salon-Est and the crossing of Salon-de-Provence with four exits, the motorway arrives at the Crau Plain. It ends at the N569/A54 junction in Saint-Martin de Crau. It re-begins at Arles-Ouest to Nîmes, Montpellier and Barcelona.
- A55 – Autoroute du Littoral "Coastal Motorway". This motorway starts at Port-de-Bouc. After the Martigues bridge, the motorway passes at the south of the Berre pond in the Estaque Mountains After the A7/A55/A551/A552 junction at Les Pennes-Mirabeau, it crosses the mountains and arrives at Marseille (Estaque district). After the junction of Grand Littoral, the way crosses the new Euroméditerranée Central Business District with a long bridge of 7 km (4.3 mi). Cars enter in the Joliette tunnel, continued by the Vieux-Port tunnel under the sea and the Prado-Carénage tooltunnel. These three tunnels crosses the Marseille city centre. A55 is connected with A50.
- A57 – Autoroute des Maures "Maures motorway". This motorways starts at A50/A57 junction after the Toulon tunnel. After the A57/1570 junction at La Valette-du-Var, the motorway continues along the plain of Maures to Cuers and Le Luc to be link with the A8.
- A500 - Tunnel de Monaco "Monaco Tunnel". This motorway starts at La Turbie (A8) at the west of Monaco. The A8 goes over Monaco but A500 goes in Monaco with a 5 km (3.1 mi) tunnel to the principality.
- A501 - Aubagne bypass, connects A50 to A52.
- A502 - Garlaban motorway. This little motorway connects the A50 from Aubagne to Aubagne-Est to the Garlaban mountains.
- A515 - Junction from A51 to Gardanne.
- A516 - L'Aixoise. This motorway connects the A51 southern East Junction to Aix city centre.
- A517 - Convergent de Septèmes-les-Vallons "Convergent of Septemes Valleys". Link between A7 and 51.
- A520 - Autoroute de la Sainte Baume "Ste. Baume motorway". This motorway starts from A52 at Pont de l'Étoile and ends at Auriol East to be connected with N560 to the Sambuc pass and Saint-Maximin-la-Sainte-Baume.
- A570 - Autoroute de la Côte "Motorway of the Coast". Link between A57 and Hyères. The national road N97 continues after to Saint-Tropez.
- N113 - Highway in Vitrolles along the A7. Highway of the Crau Plain between Saint-Martin-de-Crau (A54) to Arles-Ouest (A54).
- N296 - Aix-en-Provence bypass.
- N569 - Port of Fos-Marseille.
- D6 - Highway of Arc Valley from A515 to Rousset-Peynier Technologies centre.
- D8 - Petrochimical area of Berre.
- D9 - Link between Marseille Provence Airport, Aix TGV high speed train station, the Arbois desert, Europolis and Aix-en-Provence.

=== Trains ===
==== High speed services ====
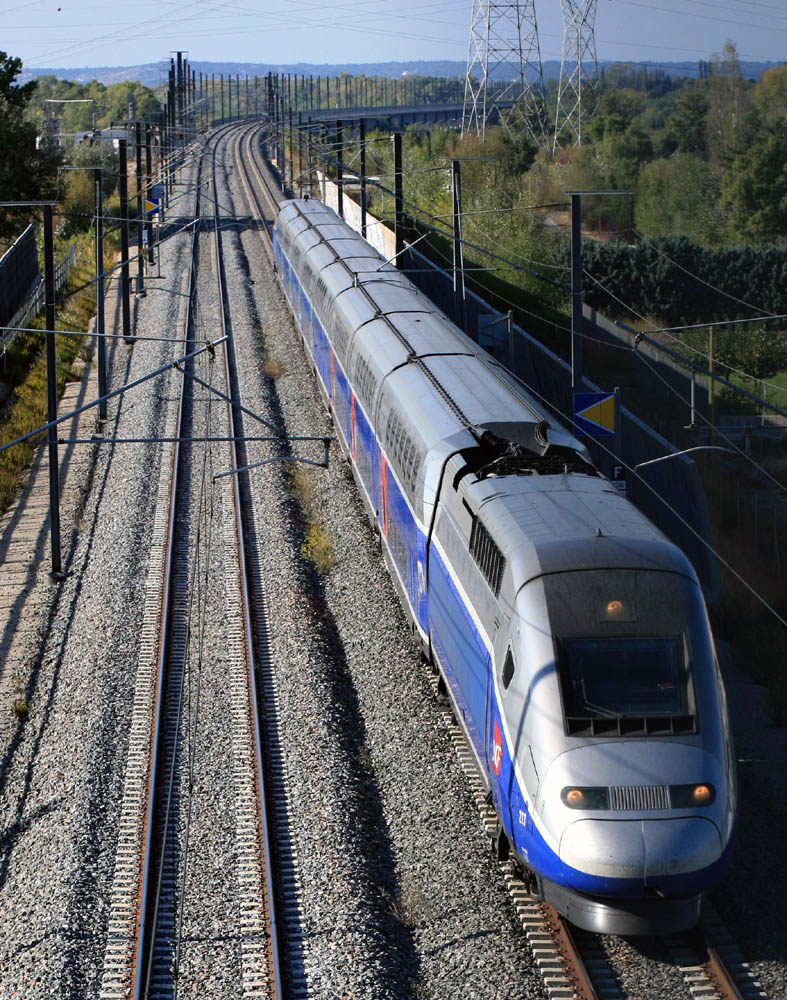
TGV on the LGV Méditerranée

The region is served by 13 high-speed trains stations and one more in the Principality of Monaco. Two stations are situated on the LGV Méditerranée opened in 2001: Avignon TGV and Aix-en-Provence TGV. The others stations served by high-speed services are Avignon-Centre, Arles, Miramas, Marseille-Saint-Charles, Toulon, Les Arcs-Draguignan, Saint-Raphaël-Valescure, Cannes, Antibes, Nice-Ville and Menton.

- Services operated
  - Paris GDL to Avignon-Centre / Miramas
  - Paris GDL to Marseille, Toulon, Nice, Monaco and Ventimiglia (Italy)
  - Nantes / Rennes to Marseille
  - Strasbourg to Marseille
  - Lille to Marseille
  - Nancy / Metz / Dijon to Marseille / Nice
  - Le Havre to Marseille
- Services operated by SNCF Ouigo:
  - Marne-la-Vallée – Chessy to Marseille
  - Lyon-Perrache to Marseille
- Services operated by SNCB/NMBS TGV:
  - Bruxelles Midi/Brussel Zuid (Belgium) to Marseille and Nice
- Services operated by CFF Lyria:
  - Geneva (Switzerland) to Marseille and Nice
- Services operated by DB Alleo:
  - Frankfurt am Main (Germany) to Marseille
- Services operated by Renfe AVE:
  - Madrid-Atocha (Spain) to Barcelona (Spain) to Marseille
- Services operated by Eurostar:
  - London Saint Pancras Int. (UK) to Ashford (UK) and Marseille
- Services operated by Thalys (seasonal):
  - Amsterdam (Netherlands) to Brussels (Belgium) and Marseille

==== National services ====
Despite the importance of the region in the national economy and demography, the national services on conventional network are not very high due to the fact of the saturations of the tracks with high speed and regional trains.

- Services operated by SNCF Intercités:
  - Bordeaux-Saint-Jean to Toulouse, Montpellier, Marseille-Saint-Charles and Nice
  - Paris-Austerlitz to Marseille-Blancarde and Nice (night train)
  - Paris-Austerlitz to Gap and Briançon (night train)
- Services operated by Thello Eurocity:
  - Marseille-Saint-Charles to Nice, Monaco, Ventimiglia, Genoa and Milano Centrale (Italy)

==== Regional services ====
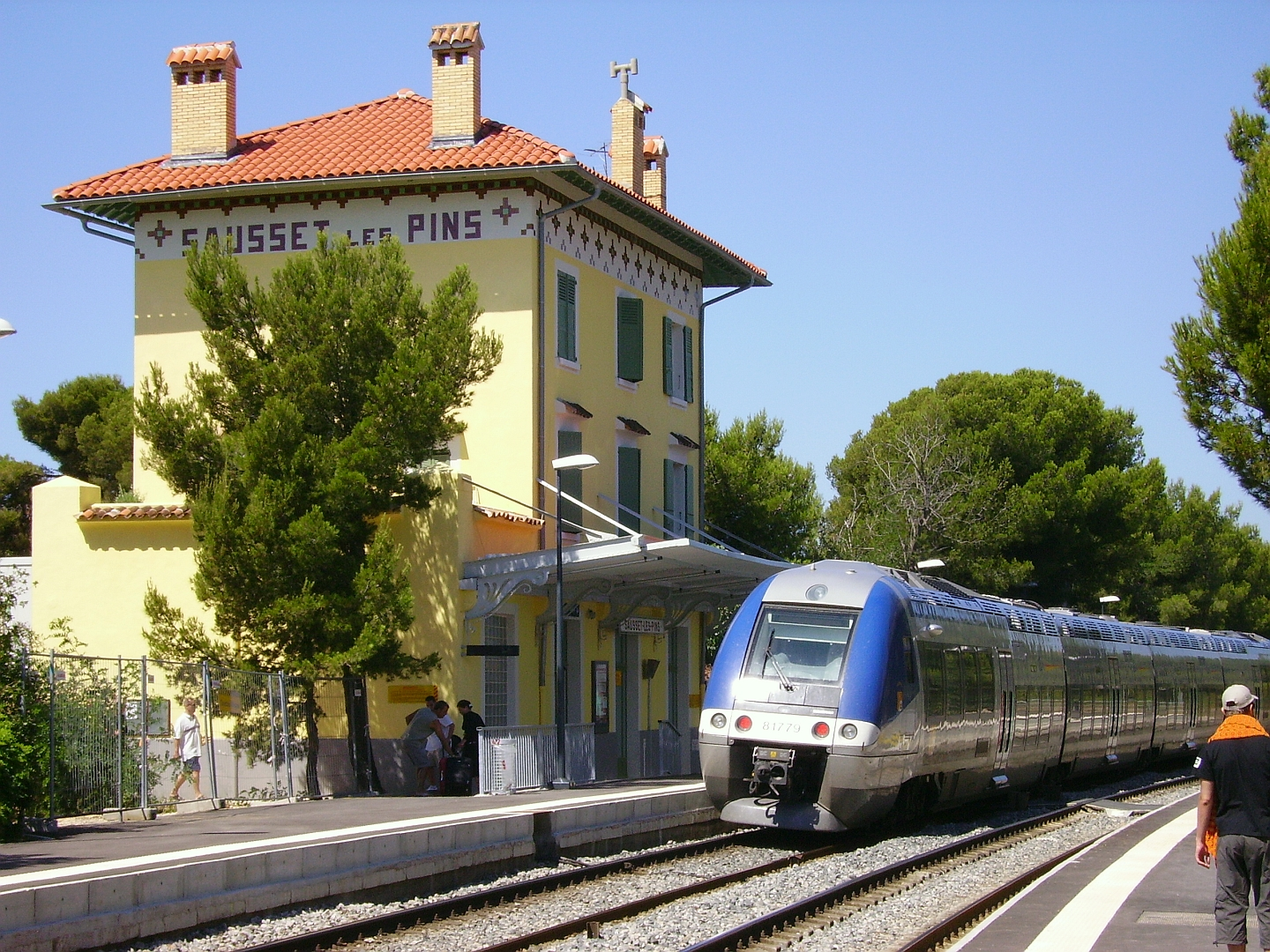
A TER Provence-Alpes-Côte d'Azur train at Sausset-les-Pins station

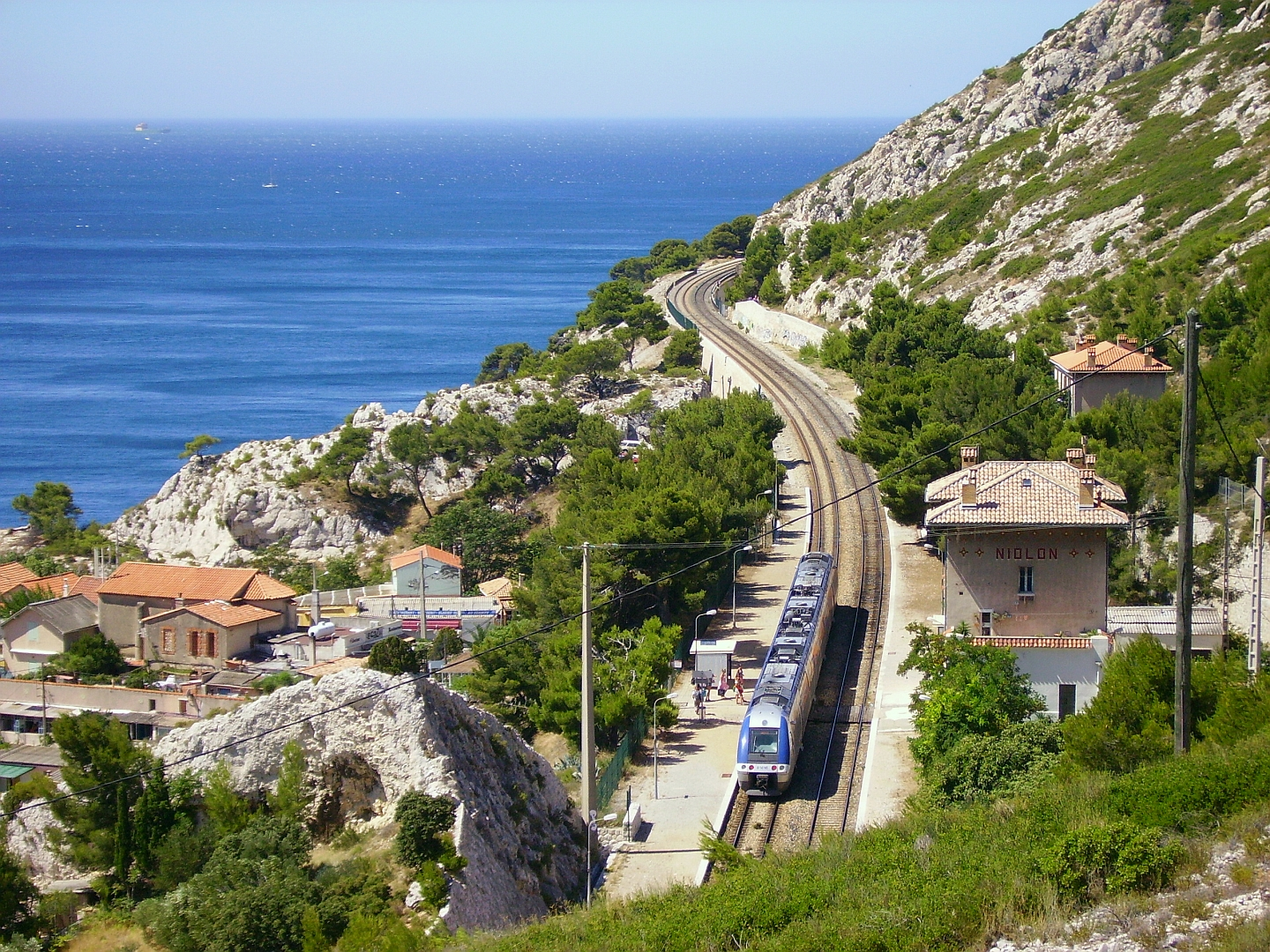
Regional service making a stop at Niolon station in Le Rove

All regional train services are operated under the ZOU! brand used for interurban train and bus services funded by the region. All such services are part of the TER Provence-Alpes-Côte d'Azur network and operated by SNCF on behalf of the region, except for services on the line between Nice and Digne-les-Bains, which are operated by Chemins de fer de Provence, a company owned by the region. In 2021 the region became the first in mainland France to open up TER services to competition, and after a tender process awarded a contract to Transdev to operate TER services on the Marseille-Nice line. Transdev is scheduled to commence operations in place of SNCF from June 2025.

The Regional Council of Provence-Alpes Côte d'Azur is the transport authority and defines the services in all region. An attractive fare permits to transport more than 100,000 passengers every day in 750 trains. Trains are leaving every 15, 20, 30, 60 or 120 minutes on each line.

The regional services operate on one set of tracks throughout the regions, which has led to delays and cancellations along the line. In 2016, during the second Council of the Year at the Region Hall in Marseille, in front of politicians and the new President of the Regional Council of Provence-Alpes-Côte d'Azur Christian Estrosi, the SNCF CEO, Guillaume Pepy, has announced the impossibility of the company to respond to the demand. The Marseille-Saint-Charles Station, the Marseille's main railway station cannot support more than 23 trains an hour and the tracks are too old and not enough to accept an average of the capacity. The project of new high-speed line called LGV PACA in 2030 could permit to increase trains on tracks with a new crossing of Marseille with a tunnel. Two new stations will be created in the territory of the city and a new line between Cannes and Nice Côte d'Azur Airport.

Services operated by CP:

- Nice CP to Colomars and Plan du Var
- Nice CP to Digne-les-Bains

Services operated by SNCF are declined with two appellations unlike other regions : TER, normally suburban trains and Intervilles, long-distance regional trains. Services operated by SNCF Intervilles:

- Marseille-Saint-Charles to Toulon, Nice and Monaco
- Marseille-Saint-Charles to Gap and Briançon
- Marseille-Saint-Charles to Avignon and Lyon-Part-Dieu
- Marseille-Saint-Charles to Montpellier, Narbonne and Perpignan
- Briançon to Gap, Valence TGV, Valence-Ville and Romans-sur-Isère
- Avignon-Centre to Montpellier, Narbonne and Perpignan

Services operated by SNCF TER:

- Marseille-Saint-Charles to Marseille-Euroméditerranée, Port-de-Bouc and Miramas
- Marseille-Saint-Charles to Vitrolles MP Airport, Miramas and Avignon-Centre
- Marseille-Saint-Charles to Vitrolles MP Airport, Miramas, Nîmes and Montpellier-Saint-Roch
- Marseille-Saint-Charles to Marseille-Euroméditerranée, Vitrolles MP Airport, Salon-de-Provence, Avignon-Centre and Avignon TGV
- Marseille-Saint-Charles to Saint-Antoine, Aix-en-Provence and Pertuis
- Marseille-Saint-Charles to Saint-Antoine, Aix-en-Provence and Sisteron
- Marseille-Saint-Charles to Marseille-Blancarde and Aubagne
- Marseille-Saint-Charles to Marseille-Blancarde, Aubagne, Toulon and Hyères
- Marseille-Saint-Charles to Marseille-Blancarde, Aubagne, Toulon and Les Arcs-Draguignan
- Avignon-Centre, Valence and Lyon-Perrache
- Avignon-Centre to Nîmes, Montpellier, Narbonne and Perpignan
- Avignon TGV to Avignon-Centre and Carpentras
- Les Arcs-Draguignan to Cannes, Nice, Monaco and Menton
- Grasse to Cannes, Nice, Monaco, Menton and Ventimiglia (Italy)
- Nice-Ville to Breil-sur-Roya and Cuneo (Italy)
- Briançon to Gap and Grenoble

==== Urban rail ====
The Métro de Marseille — opened in 1977 — is the region's sole subway system and consists of two lines, with a third planned.

Marseilles also has a modern tramway with three lines, as do Aubagne and Avignon with one line each and Nice, with three lines. Each of those cities rebuilt their tram networks after they were shut down in the mid-20th century — the exception being Line 68 in Marseilles, which continued service until 2004 before being rebuilt and reopened as part of the current system in 2007.

Tram networks operated in Aix-en-Provence, La Ciotat and Toulon in the early- and mid-20th century also but have not been revived.

== Environment ==
The mining company Alteo processes bauxite to produce aluminium, resulting in various waste materials such as "boues rouges" (red mud) and arsenic. The dumping of this waste in the marine reserve of Calanques National Park for six years was authorised by the French Government in 2015, and has been a continuing source of disagreement and legal procedures between environmental protection, government, and industrial lobbies. Company representatives have dismissed environmental concerns as exaggerated and uninformed.

The region also includes another national park, Port-Cros National Park near Toulon.

== Education ==
Major universities of the region include the Aix-Marseille University, the University of Toulon, the University of Avignon and the Côte d'Azur University. Other towns have higher education classes but no universities.
