= A500 =

A500 may refer to:

- A500 road, England
- A500 steel, an ASTM International grade steel for structural steel applications
- Adam A500, a utility aircraft
- Amiga 500, a home computer by Commodore
- Amiga 500 Plus or 500+, a home computer by Commodore
- Acorn A500, an early prototype of the Acorn Archimedes computer
- DSLR-A500 a.k.a. α500, a digital SLR with A-mount in the Sony Alpha camera system
- Acer Iconia Tab A500, a tablet computer by Acer
