= A50 autoroute =

Road in France

A50 autoroute

Route information
- Maintained by DIR Méditerranée and ESCOTA
- Length: 70 km (43 mi)
- Existed: 1962–present

Major junctions
- West end: Marseille
- A 507 in Marseille; A 501 / A 502 / A 52 in Aubagne

- East end: A 57 in Toulon

Location
- Country: France

Highway system
- Roads in France; Autoroutes; Routes nationales

The A50 autoroute is a French motorway connecting Marseille to Toulon. The motorway is 65 km and has a mixture of 2x2 and 2x3 lanes that run through mountainous coastal terrain along the Mediterranean. As such, it has some relatively sharp turns and steep gradients by French motorway standards, and some sections have a reduced speed limit of 110 km/h.

The first section between Marseille and Aubagne was opened in 1962 and was until 1963 part of the A52 autoroute until it was renumbered after the surrounding motorways were constructed. Most of the remainder between Aubagne and Toulon was completed by 1975. The road is tolled between Roquefort-la-Bédoule and Sanary-sur-Mer and is managed by ESCOTA and was the first section to trial Télépéage or Télébadge, an automatic toll payment system using a windscreen mounted sensor, in 1992.

At the eastern end of the A50, drivers can choose between entering Toulon by the RN 8 or crossing under the city by going through the tunnel de Toulon, which leads directly to the A57 autoroute and on to Hyeres and Nice. The southern carriageway of the tunnel finally opened in 2014, after some 20 years of planning and construction, making the tunnel a 2x2 lane two-way link between the A50 and A57. Until then, the tunnel had only a two-lane carriageway running east to west, which opened in 2002.

== Junctions ==
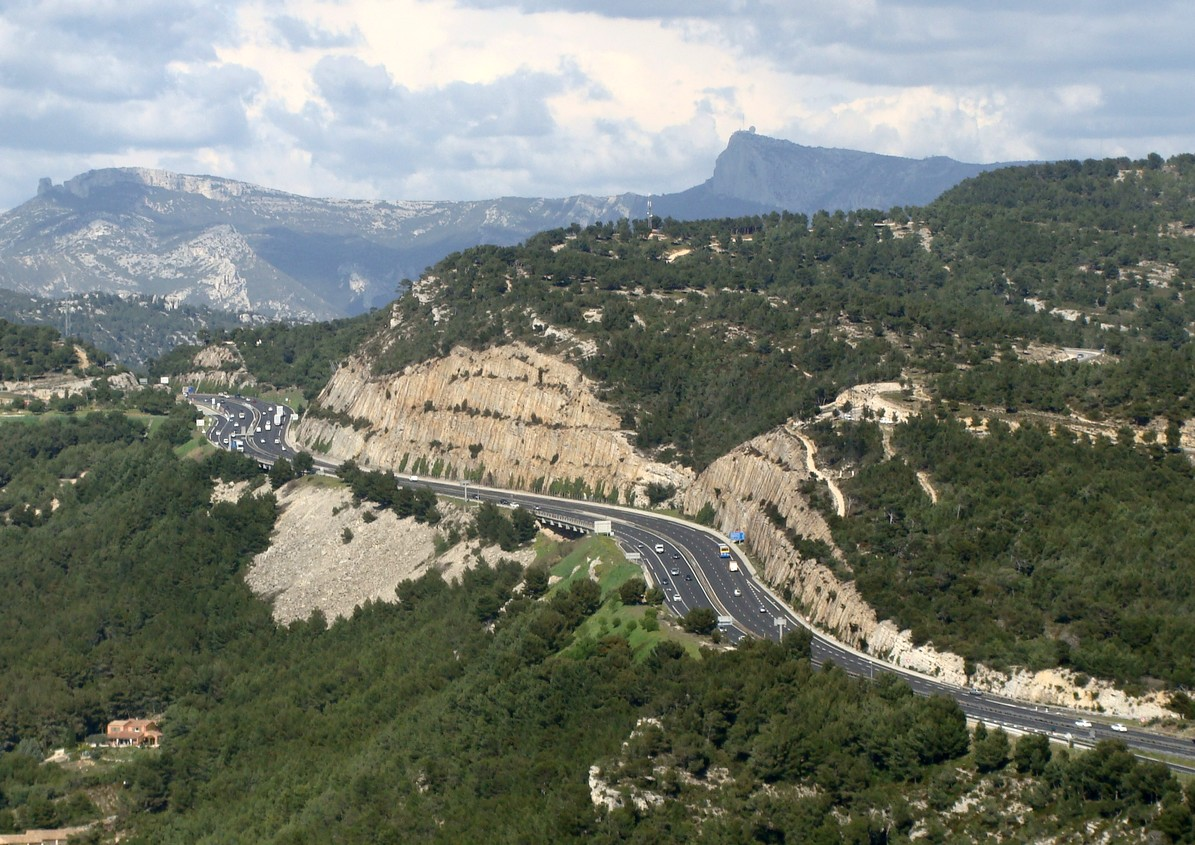
The A50 in the area of Cassis

Region	Department	Junction	Destinations	Notes
Provence-Alpes-Côte-d'Azur	Bouches-du-Rhône	1 : Menpenti	Marseille - centre-ville, Vieux-Port, Menpenti, Le Rouet, Saint-Giniez, Sainte-Anne, Mazargues, La Plage	
Provence-Alpes-Côte-d'Azur	Bouches-du-Rhône	2 : Place de Pologne	Marseille - Baille, La Timone, La Capelette, Saint-Loup, Menpenti	
Provence-Alpes-Côte-d'Azur	Bouches-du-Rhône	3 : Florian	Marseille - La Pomme, la Timone, Saint-Loup, Pont-de-Vivaux, La Rose (A507)	
Provence-Alpes-Côte-d'Azur	Bouches-du-Rhône	A507 - A50	Marseille - La Rose, Aix-en-Provence (A51), Marignane (A7), Fos-Martigues	
Provence-Alpes-Côte-d'Azur	Bouches-du-Rhône	Aire de la Pomme (Eastbound)		
Provence-Alpes-Côte-d'Azur	Bouches-du-Rhône	4 : Saint-Marcel	Marseille	
Provence-Alpes-Côte-d'Azur	Bouches-du-Rhône	4b : La Valentine	Marseille - Saint-Menet, La Barasse	
Provence-Alpes-Côte-d'Azur	Bouches-du-Rhône	5 : La Penne-sur-Huveaune	La Penne-sur-Huveaune, Marseille - Saint-Menet, La Millière	
Provence-Alpes-Côte-d'Azur	Bouches-du-Rhône	A501 - A50	Nice, Aix-en-Provence (A52), Aubagne - centre	Entry and exit from Marseille
Provence-Alpes-Côte-d'Azur	Bouches-du-Rhône	A502 - A50	Toulon par RD, Aubagne - Les Passons, Gémenos, Z.I. des Paluds	Entry and exit from Marseille
Provence-Alpes-Côte-d'Azur	Bouches-du-Rhône	A52 - A50	Lyon (A7), Aix-en-Provence (A8), Gémenos, Aubagne	Entry and exit from Toulon
Provence-Alpes-Côte-d'Azur	Bouches-du-Rhône	6 : Carnoux	Cassis, Carnoux-en-Provence	Entry and exit from Marseille
Provence-Alpes-Côte-d'Azur	Bouches-du-Rhône	7 : Roquefort-la-Bédoule	Carnoux-en-Provence, Roquefort-la-Bédoule, La Ciotat par RD	
Provence-Alpes-Côte-d'Azur	Bouches-du-Rhône	Aire du Pas d'Ouillier (Eastbound)		
Provence-Alpes-Côte-d'Azur	Bouches-du-Rhône	8 : Cassis	Cassis	
Provence-Alpes-Côte-d'Azur	Bouches-du-Rhône	9 : Ciotat	La Ciotat	
Provence-Alpes-Côte-d'Azur	Bouches-du-Rhône	Péage de La Ciotat		
Provence-Alpes-Côte-d'Azur	Bouches-du-Rhône	Aire des Frères Lumière (Eastbound); Aire de la Baie de La Ciotat (Westbound)		
Provence-Alpes-Côte-d'Azur	Var	10 : Saint-Cyr-sur-Mer	Saint-Cyr-sur-Mer	
Provence-Alpes-Côte-d'Azur	Var	11 : Le Castellet	La Cadière-d'Azur, Le Beausset, Circuit du Castellet, Z. I. Signes	
Provence-Alpes-Côte-d'Azur	Var	12 : Bandol	Bandol, Sanary-sur-Mer - Plages	
Provence-Alpes-Côte-d'Azur	Var	Péage de Bandol		
Provence-Alpes-Côte-d'Azur	Var	Aire de Sanary		
Provence-Alpes-Côte-d'Azur	Var	12.1 : Ollioules-Sanary	Sanary-sur-Mer - centre, Ollioules - centre, La Gare	
Provence-Alpes-Côte-d'Azur	Var	13 : Six-Fours-les-Plages	La Seyne-sur-Mer - centre, Six-Fours-les-Plages, Sanary-sur-Mer, Ollioules - Piedardan	
Provence-Alpes-Côte-d'Azur	Var	14 : Châteauvallon	Aubagne par RD, La Seyne-sur-Mer - La Gare, Toulon - La Beaucaire, Ollioules - Châteauvallon	
Provence-Alpes-Côte-d'Azur	Var	15a : Toulon - ouest	Toulon, Port militaire de Toulon, Le Revest-les-Eaux	
Provence-Alpes-Côte-d'Azur	Var	15b : La Seyne	La Seyne-sur-Mer - centre, Hôpital	
Provence-Alpes-Côte-d'Azur	Var	16 : Toulon - Bon Rencontre	Toulon - Pont du Las, Base-Navale, Saint-Roch	Entry and exit from Marseille
Provence-Alpes-Côte-d'Azur	Var	17 : Toulon- centre	Toulon - Le Port, Le Mourillon	Entry from Toulon and exit from Marseille
A 50 becomes A 57
1.000 mi = 1.609 km; 1.000 km = 0.621 mi
