= A57 autoroute =

Road in southeastern France

A57 autoroute

Route information
- Maintained by ESCOTA
- Length: 52 km (32 mi)
- Existed: 1964–present

Major junctions
- West end: A 50 in Toulon

- A 570 in La Garde

- East end: E80 / A 8 in Le Cannet-des-Maures

Location
- Country: France

Highway system
- Roads in France; Autoroutes; Routes nationales

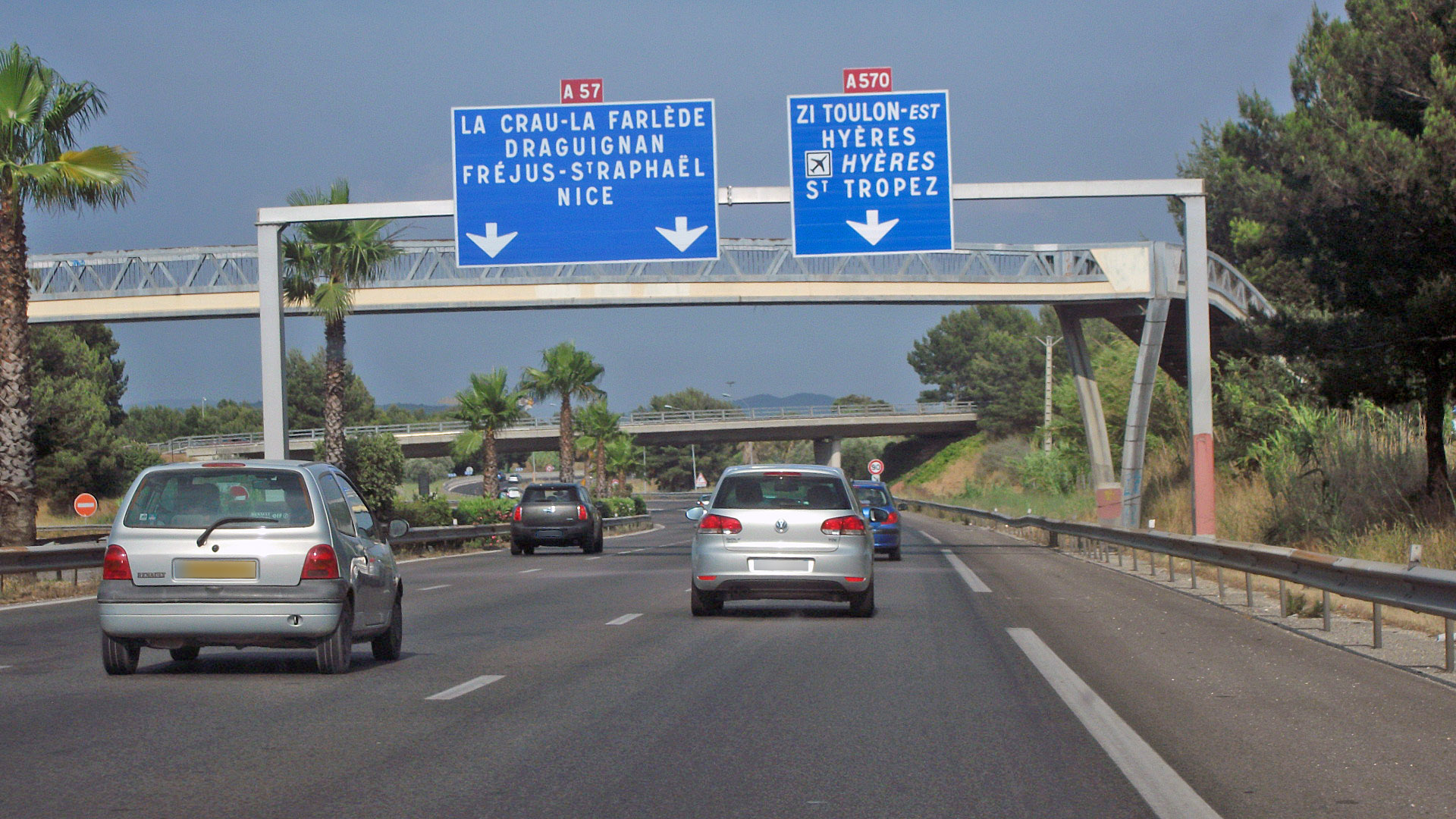
Exchange A57-A570 Junction with A570 spur onto Hyères and Le Lavandou (Toulon -> Hyères side)

The A57 autoroute is a motorway in south eastern France.

It is 55 km long and runs from the Tunnel de Toulon to the A8 near Le Luc. The road is a toll motorway north of Toulon. It is operated by ESCOTA. It connects with the A570 spur to the town of Hyères. The motorway traverses the Massif des Maures and is mainly 2x2 lanes. The western terminus of the motorway links directly to the Toulon tunnel and onward to the A50 autoroute and Marseille.

== History ==
- 1968 : Opening of the first section Toulon to La-Valette-du-Var then numbered the A54.
- 2014 (March, 18th) : The tunnel de Toulon (Toulon's tunnel) opens its second section, in the Toulon -> Marseille direction (the first section, Marseille -> Toulon, is closed for several months for maintenance and improvements).
- 2018 : The 2x2 lane section between Toulon Tunnel and A570 is currently due to be widened to 3 lanes in each direction in order to address the perennial traffic jams during rush hour on this section. The land required for the widening has been allocated and the work is due to commence in 2018.

== List of exits and junctions ==
Region	Department	Junction	Destinations	Notes
A 50 becomes A 57
Provence-Alpes-Côte-d'Azur	Var	1 : Benoît Malon	Toulon - La Rode, Saint-Jean-du-Var, Cap Brun, La Barentine, Le Port	Entry and exit from A8
Provence-Alpes-Côte-d'Azur	Var	2 : La Palasse	Carqueiranne, Le Pradet, Toulon - Pont-du-Suve, La Serinette	Entry and exit from A8
Provence-Alpes-Côte-d'Azur	Var	3 : Le Tombadou	La Valette-du-Var - centre, Coupiane, Toulon - est, Centre hospitalier de Sainte-Musse	
Provence-Alpes-Côte-d'Azur	Var	4 : Les Fourches	La Garde, La Valette-du-Var - sud, Le Revest-les-Eaux	
Provence-Alpes-Côte-d'Azur	Var	5/5a/5b : La Biguet	Valgora, La Valette-du-Var - nord, Les Plantades, Centre commercial, Université	
Provence-Alpes-Côte-d'Azur	Var	5/5a/5b : La Biguet	Aire de La Bigue (Eastbound)	
Provence-Alpes-Côte-d'Azur	Var	A570 - A57	Saint-Tropez, Hyères, Aéroport d'Hyères, La Garde, Z. I. Toulon Est	
Provence-Alpes-Côte-d'Azur	Var	Aire de La Chaberte (Westbound)		
Provence-Alpes-Côte-d'Azur	Var	6 : La Farlède	La Crau, La Farlède, Solliès-Ville, Centre pénitentiaire, Z. A. La Castillette, Z. I. Bec de Canard, Z. A. Pierre-Blanche	
Provence-Alpes-Côte-d'Azur	Var	7 : Les Terrins	Saint-Maximin-la-Sainte-Baume, Solliès-Toucas, Solliès-Pont	
Provence-Alpes-Côte-d'Azur	Var	8 : Sainte-Christine	Solliès-Pont, Z.A. de la Poulasse, Centre commercial	
Provence-Alpes-Côte-d'Azur	Var	9 : Cuers - sud	Cuers, Z.A.C des Bousquets	Entry and exit from Toulon
Provence-Alpes-Côte-d'Azur	Var	10 : Cuers - nord	Fréjus, Saint-Raphaël, Draguignan, Le Luc, Brignoles, Puget-Ville, Pierrefeu-du-Var, Cuers, AIA-CP	
Provence-Alpes-Côte-d'Azur	Var	Péage de Puget-Ville		
Provence-Alpes-Côte-d'Azur	Var	Aire de Suvé du Vent (Eastbound); Aire des Lauvets (Westbound)		
Provence-Alpes-Côte-d'Azur	Var	11 : Carnoules	Gonfaron, Pignans, Carnoules	Entry and exit from Toulon
Provence-Alpes-Côte-d'Azur	Var	13 : Le Cannet-des-Maures	La Garde-Freinet, Les Arcs, Vidauban, Le Luc, Le Cannet-des-Maures	
Provence-Alpes-Côte-d'Azur	Var	Aire des Sigues (Eastbound); Aire de Gonfaron (Westbound)		
Provence-Alpes-Côte-d'Azur	Var	A8 - A57	Marseille, Aix-en-Provence	
Provence-Alpes-Côte-d'Azur	Var	A8 - A57	Nice, Cannes, Fréjus, Saint-Raphaël, Draguignan	
1.000 mi = 1.609 km; 1.000 km = 0.621 mi
