= European route E74 =

Road in trans-European E-road network

E74

Major junctions
- South-West end: Nice, France
- North-East end: Alessandria, Italy

Location
- Countries: France; Italy

Highway system
- International E-road network; A Class; B Class

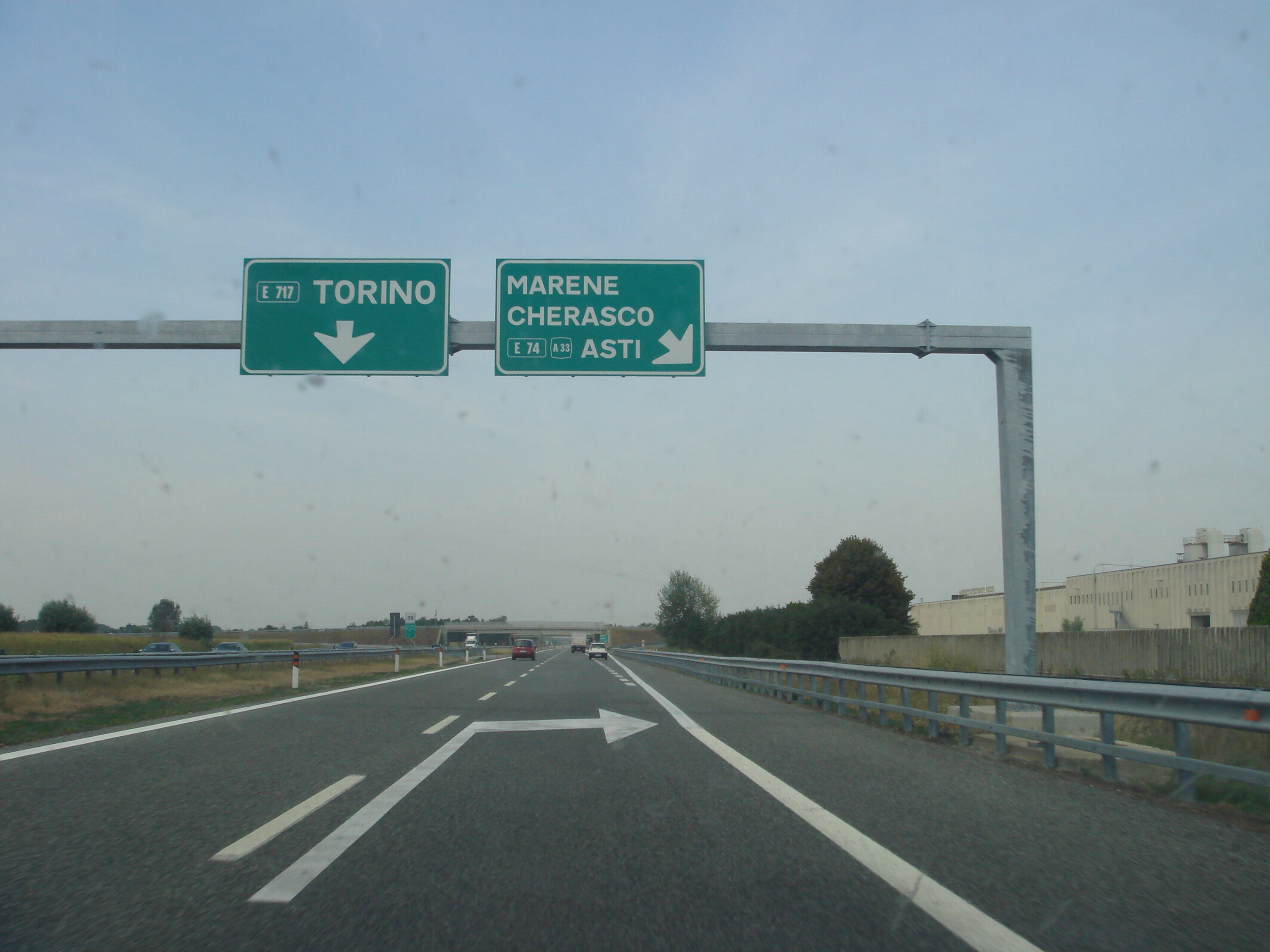
European route 74 near Isola d'Asti, Italy.

European route E74 is a series of roads in France and Italy, part of the United Nations International E-road network. The route runs from Nice in France to Alessandria in Italy.

At its starting point in Nice the E74 connects to European route E80, from where it heads southeast, crossing the Italian border into Piedmont, then passing through Cuneo and Asti before finally reaching Alessandria. At this point it links to European route E25 and European route E70. The total length of the E74 is 246 km (153 mi).
