= Tour Royale, Toulon =

Coordinates: 43°6′10″N 5°55′33″E

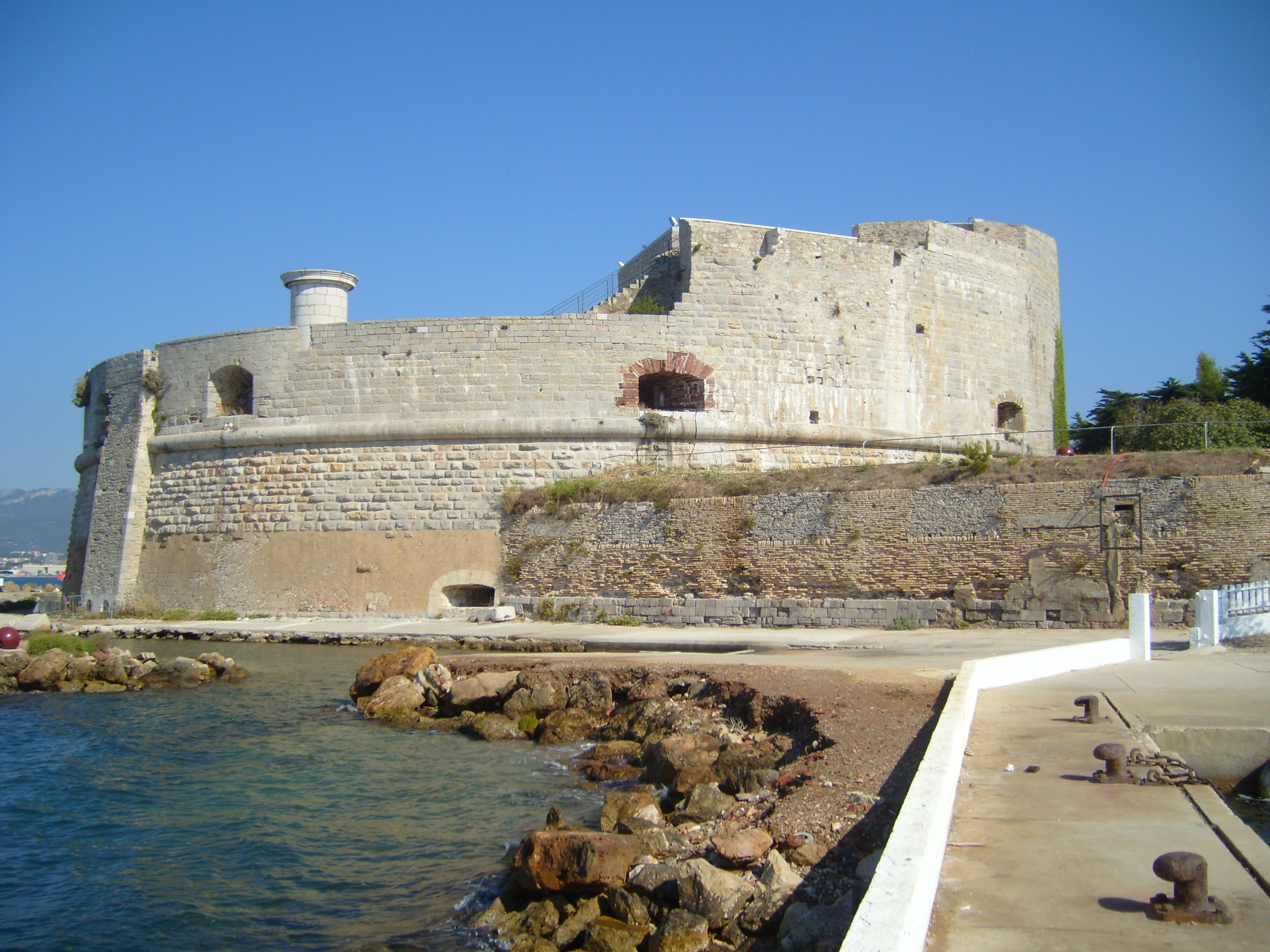
The Tour Royale in Toulon (16th century)

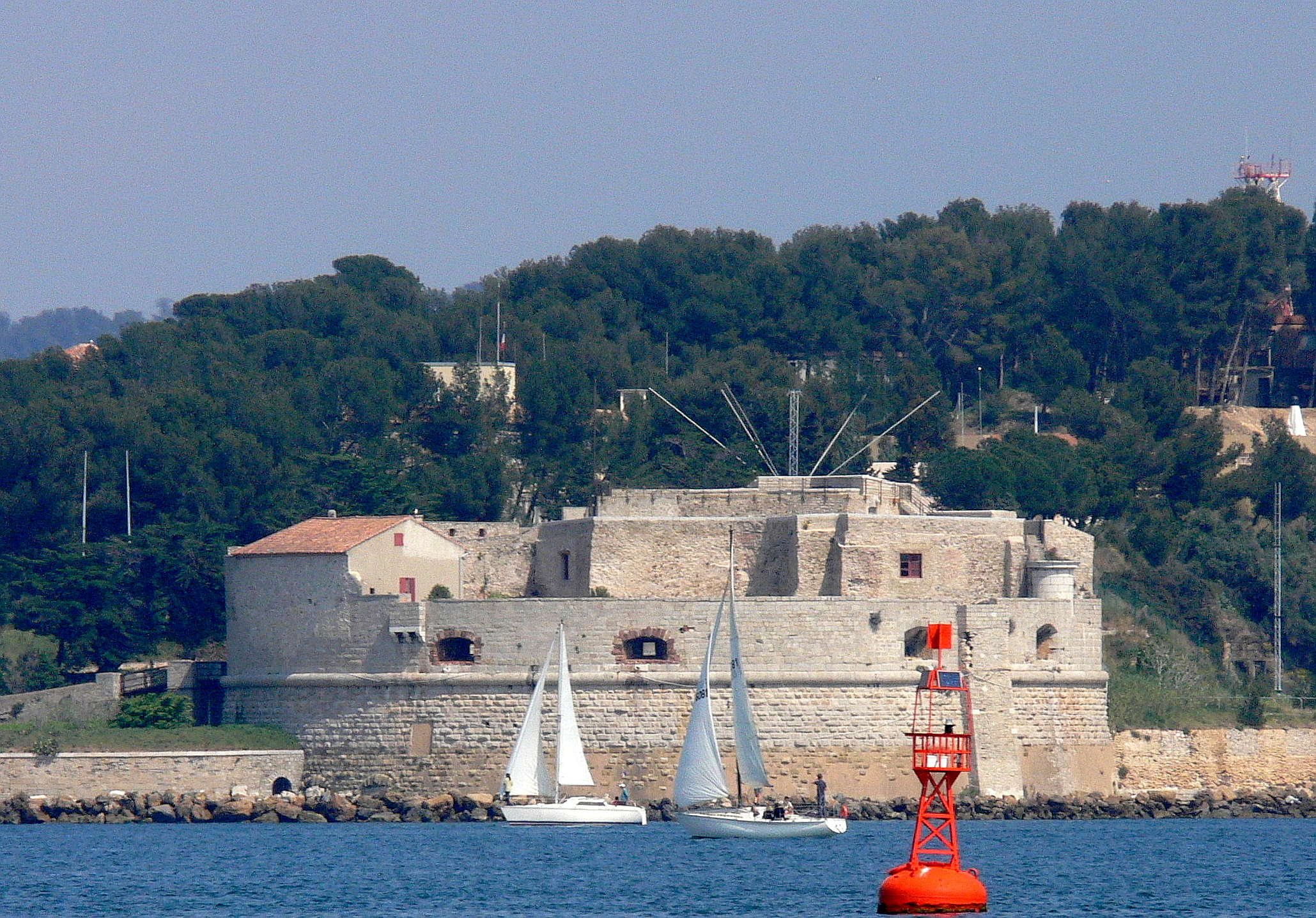
The Tour Royal, Toulon, seen from the Rade

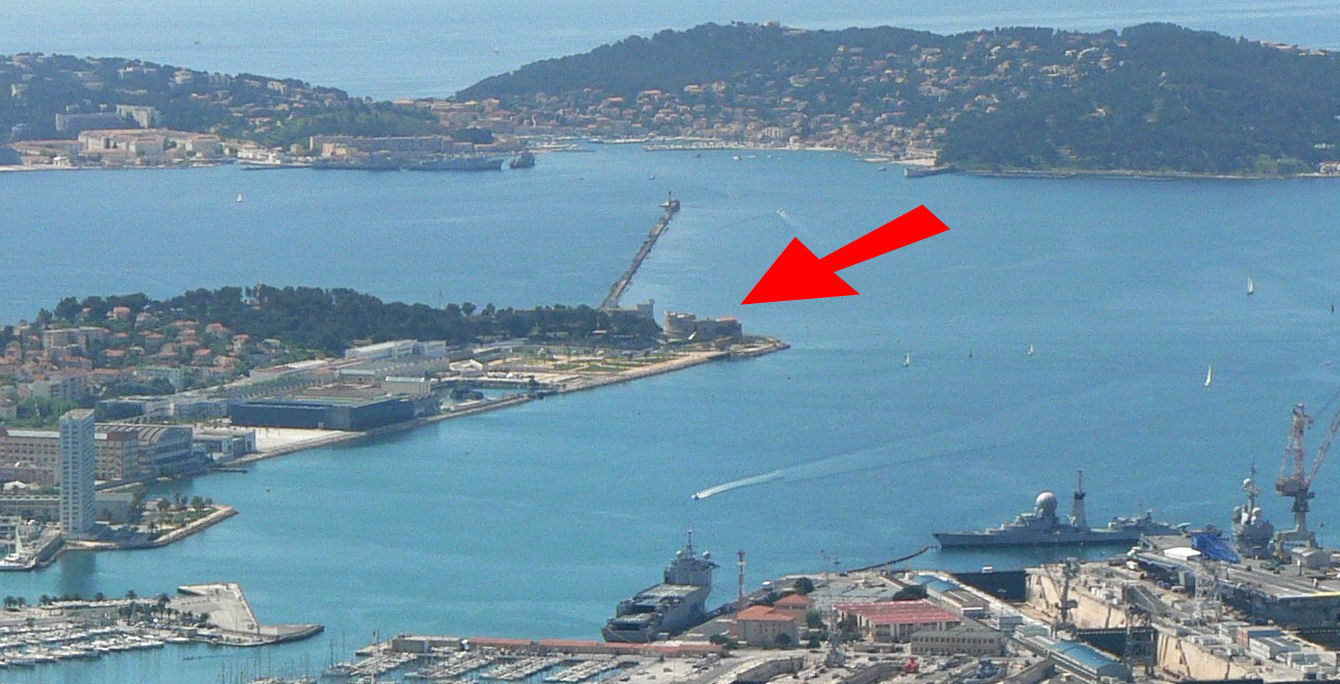
The Tour Royale is located at the entrance of Toulon harbor.

The Tour Royale (also known as La Grosse Tour) is a fort built in the 16th century to protect the entrance of the Petit Rade, the naval port of Toulon. It was the first fortification of the harbor, built 22 years after Provence became a part of France.

The fort was commissioned in 1513 by King Louis XII at the request of the bishop of Toulon and of the Senechal of Provence. It was placed on the cap de la Manegue, at the end of the pointe de la Mitre, where it could fire at any ships coming into the Rade. The design was by the Italian engineer Gian-Antonio della Porta. It was a classical example of a Torrioni, a round tower with cannon, constructed around Renaissance Italy in the 16th century. The tower was sixty meters in diameter and seven meters thick. Construction began in 1514 and was finished in 1524, during the reign of Francis I of France, at a cost of 30,000 florins. Because of its impressive size, the residents of Toulon called "La Grosse Tour."

The tower had hardly been finished when it was captured by the army of Charles V, Holy Roman Emperor, led by the Connetable de Bourbon, when he invaded Provence. The Connetable avoided a long and costly siege by simply paying the commander of the fort 500 ecues to surrender. After the commander and garrison took their money and left, the fort was occupied by 300 Spanish mercenaries. This event led to the coining of an expression in Toulon, "to be sold like the Grosse Tour."

When the Imperial army left, the fort was used to imprison the chevalier Bertrande de la Garde, who had fought for Charles V against Francis I. He was the first of many political prisoners to be held in the underground cells of the fort.

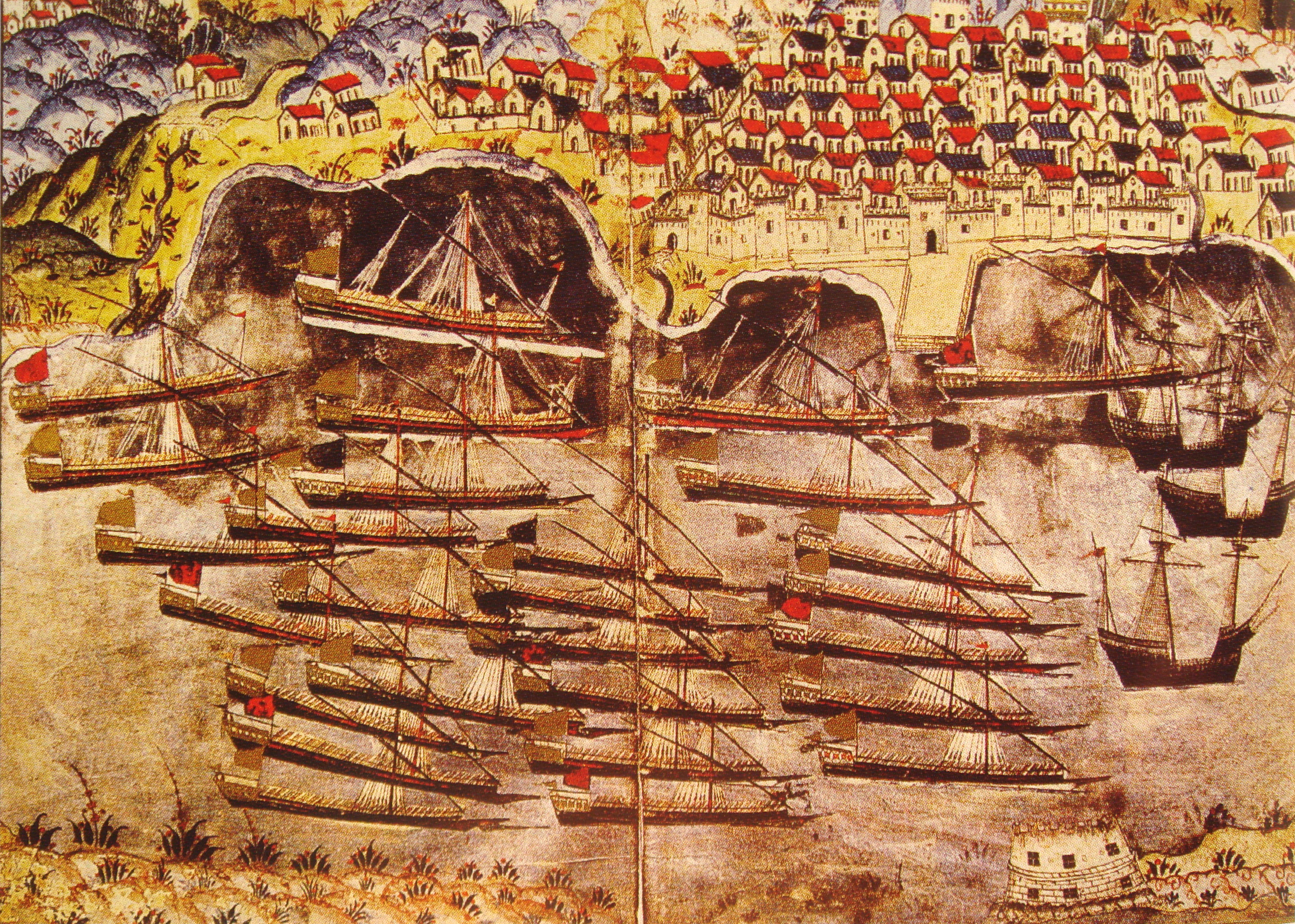
Barbarossa's Ottoman fleet wintering in the harbor of Toulon in 1543, with the Tour Royale (bottom right).

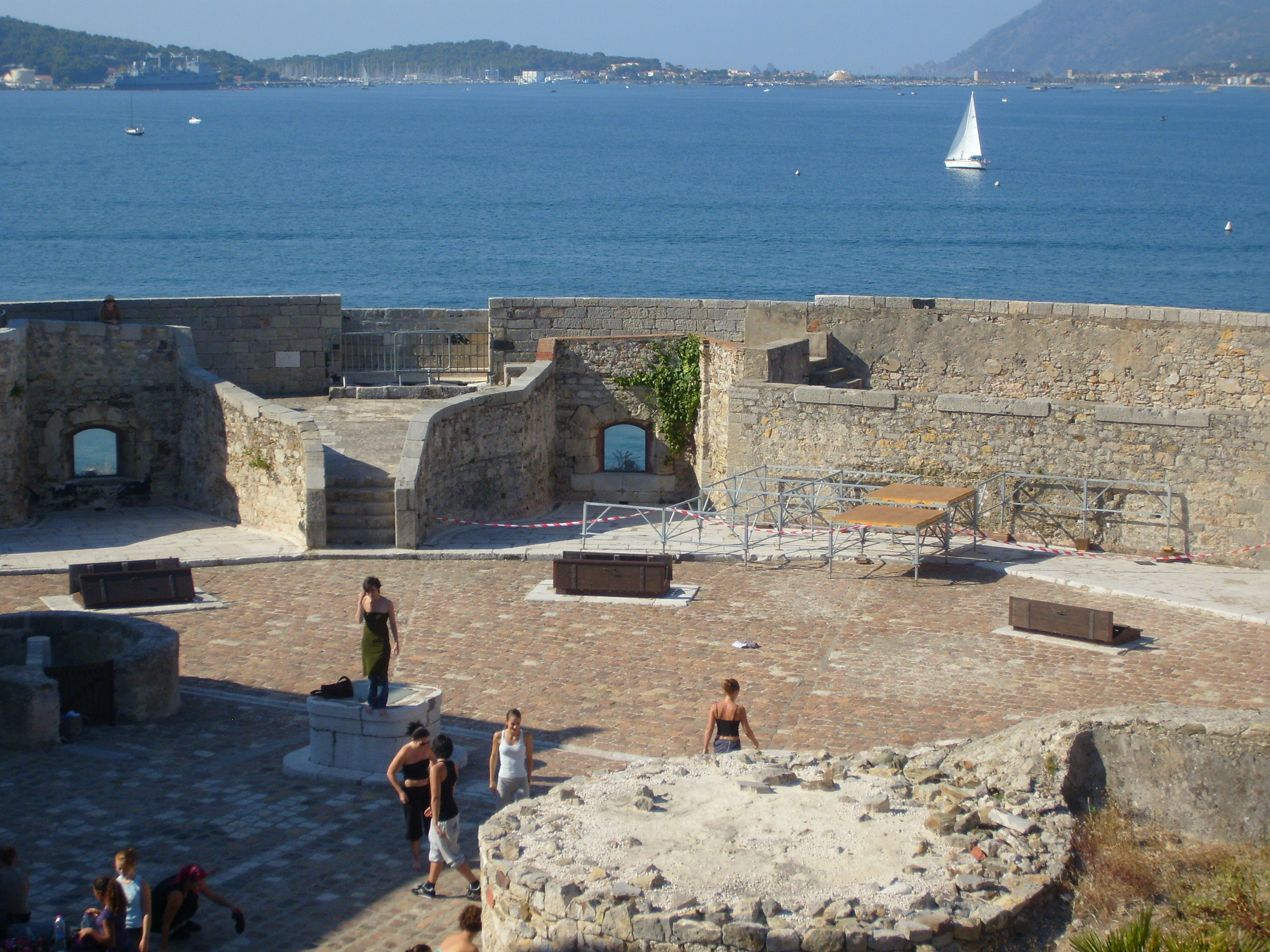
In 1798 the future Empress Josephine watched Napoleon's fleet sail to Egypt from the parapet of the Tour Royale

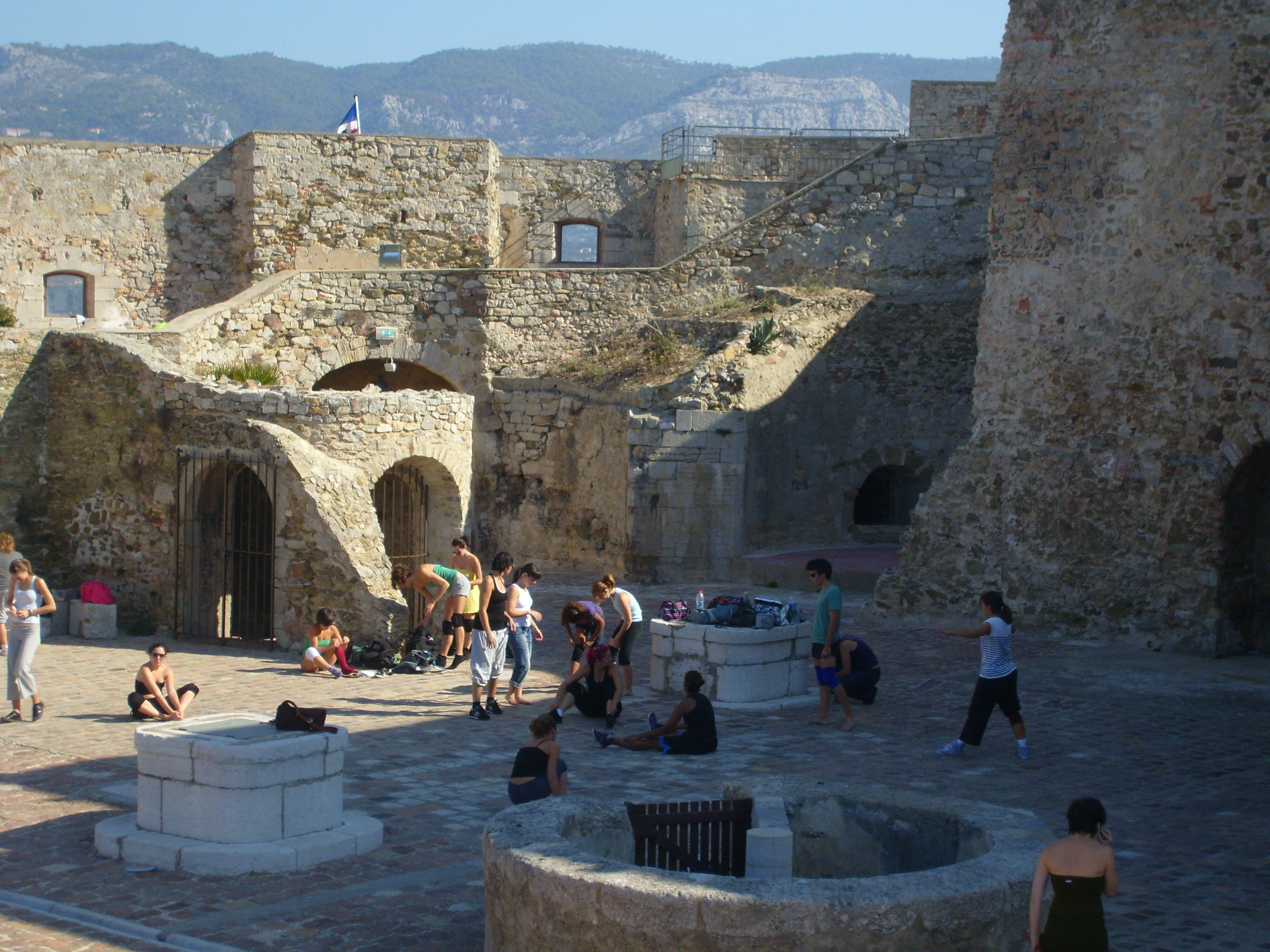
Circular stairways lead down from the gun platform to the lower galleries and powder magazines of the Tour Royale

In 1543, Francis I formed a temporary Franco-Ottoman alliance with the Ottoman Sultan Suleiman the Magnificent, and invited the Ottoman fleet to spend the winter in Toulon harbour. The Tour Royale was used to store all the artillery from the ramparts of Toulon, until the Ottoman fleet departed.

In 1572, when the news of the massacre of Protestants in Paris on St. Bartholomew's Day became known, the commander of the fort, Nicolas de Pignan, gave sanctuary to the Protestant families of Toulon within the fort.

In 1596, during the wars of religion across France, the commander of the Chateau D'If, who had remained loyal to Henry IV of France, had a meeting in the Tour Royale with the Duke de Guise, Governor of Provence, to agree on a way to drive the Spaniards from Marseille, which had declared itself an independent republic.

In 1634, Cardinal Richelieu decided to strengthen the harbor defenses and had a second fort, Fort Ballaguier, constructed opposite the Tour Royale.

In 1679, Louis XIV sent his chief military architect, Vauban, to make the fortifications of Toulon strong enough to resist a British attack. Vauban described the Tour Royale as a "very beautiful work with several floors and batteries," but he considered it unfinished. He recommended adding another level of cannons, and a new battery at the foot of the tower, and lowering the hills around to give the gunners a clearer view of approaching enemy ships.

The Tour was equipped with forty cannon, but Vauban's other improvements were not carried out. Nonetheless, in 1707, during the War of the Spanish Succession, the Tour helped Toulon to successfully resist a combined attack and siege by a British-Dutch fleet and the army of Eugene of Savoy.

In 1770, a new fort, Fort Lamalgue, was constructed at the harbor entrance, the Tour Royale was no longer as important for the defense of the port. It became primarily a place to lock up military prisoners, Corsican rebels, and, during the French Revolution, first royalists and then supporters of the Republic.

In 1798, when Napoleon Bonaparte's fleet of 200 ships departed Toulon for Egypt, the future Empress Josephine watched the departure of the fleet from the Tour Royale.

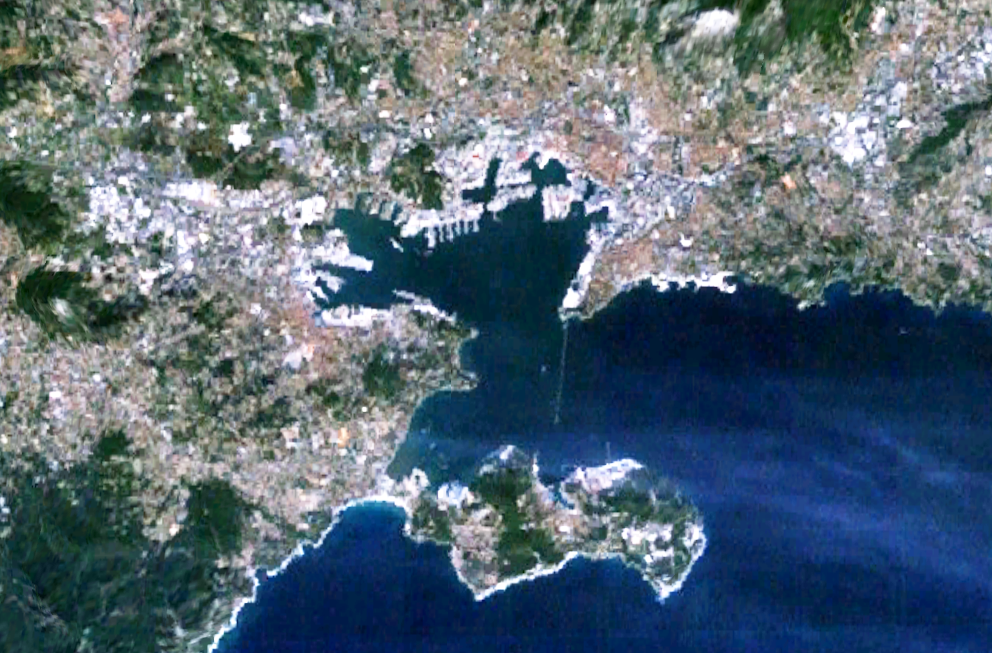
The Tour Royale is located at the southernmost point on the east side of the harbor entrance, near the base of the long jetty that now closes the harbor.

During the Franco-German War of 1870, the gold reserves of France were secretly stored inside the fort. During the First World War, it was used both as barracks and to intern German prisoners of war. During the Second World War, the fort was occupied by a German garrison. It was badly damaged by Allied bombings in 1943-1944.

The Tour Royale was classified as an historic monument on April 11, 1947. The underground cells were filled in, and the chapel, barracks and hospital were removed, but the casemates, circular galleries and embrasures for the cannon still remain as they were.

In 2004, the tower became a museum, and in 2006, it was transferred from the Ministry of Defense to the city of Toulon. and opened to the public. A coastal path from the fort connects it to the beaches of Mourillon.

As of September 2010 the Tour Royale is open to the public from July 1 until October 31, on Wednesdays, Saturdays and Sundays, from 900 until 1200 and from 1400 until 1800.

== Bibliography ==
- La Tour Royale et son parc paysager, visitors guide published by the city of Toulon, Second Edition, July 2010
- Michel Vergé-Franceschi, Toulon, port royal 1481-1789, Tallandier, Paris 2002
- Vauban a Toulon - l'arsenal et la rade. (Catalog of exhibit). Musée Balaguier, Musée national de la Marine 2007.
