= Auguste Aiguier =

French marine painter (1819–1865)

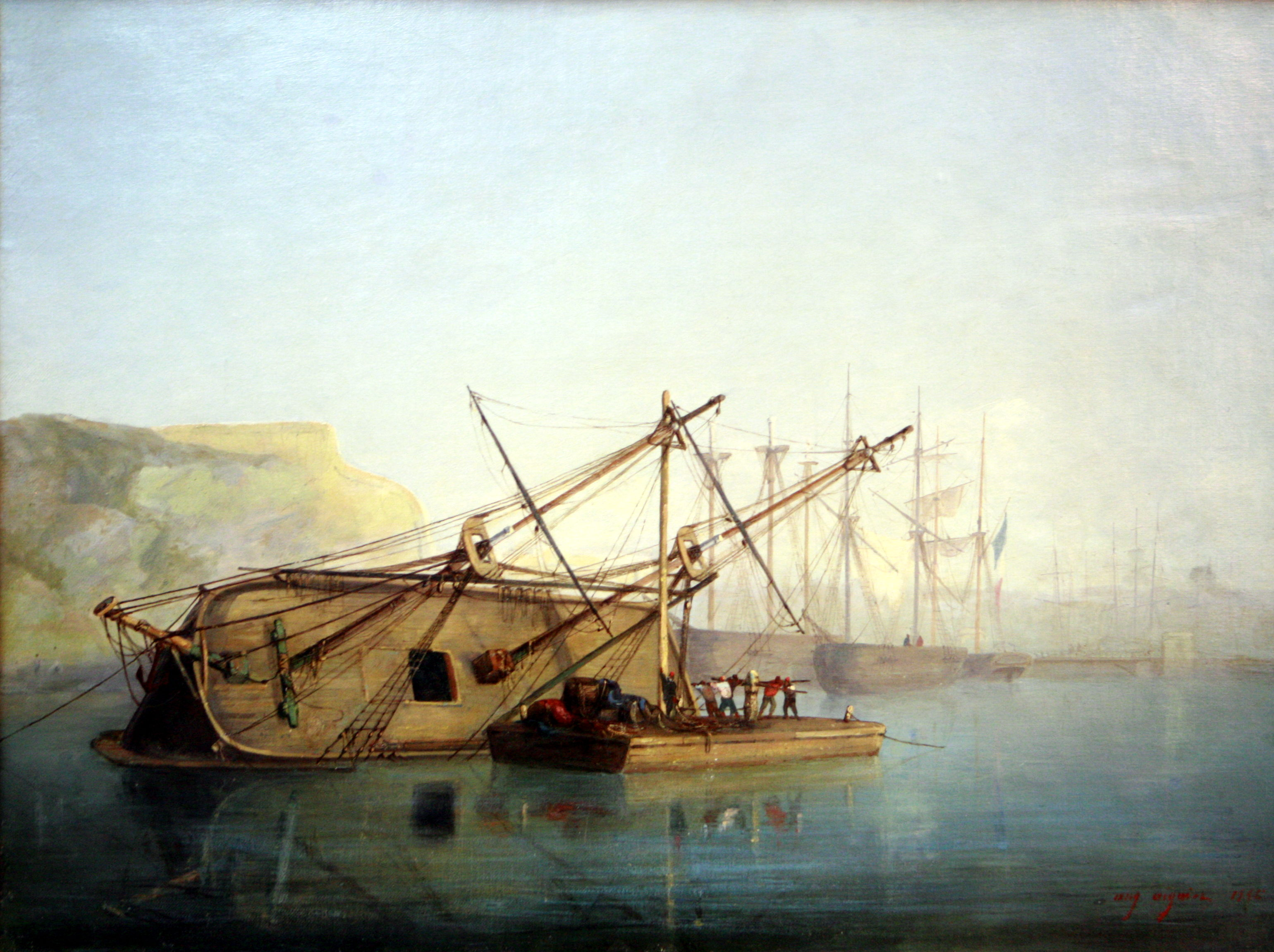
Hull repairs on a sail ship. Oil on canvas, 1846. Now at the Marseille naval museum.

Louis Auguste Laurent Aiguier, a French marine painter, was born at Toulon in 1819, and died in that town in 1865. There are examples of his work in the Museums of Toulon and Marseille.
