= Toulon =

Prefecture and city in France

Toulon Tolon (Occitan)
- Prefecture and commune
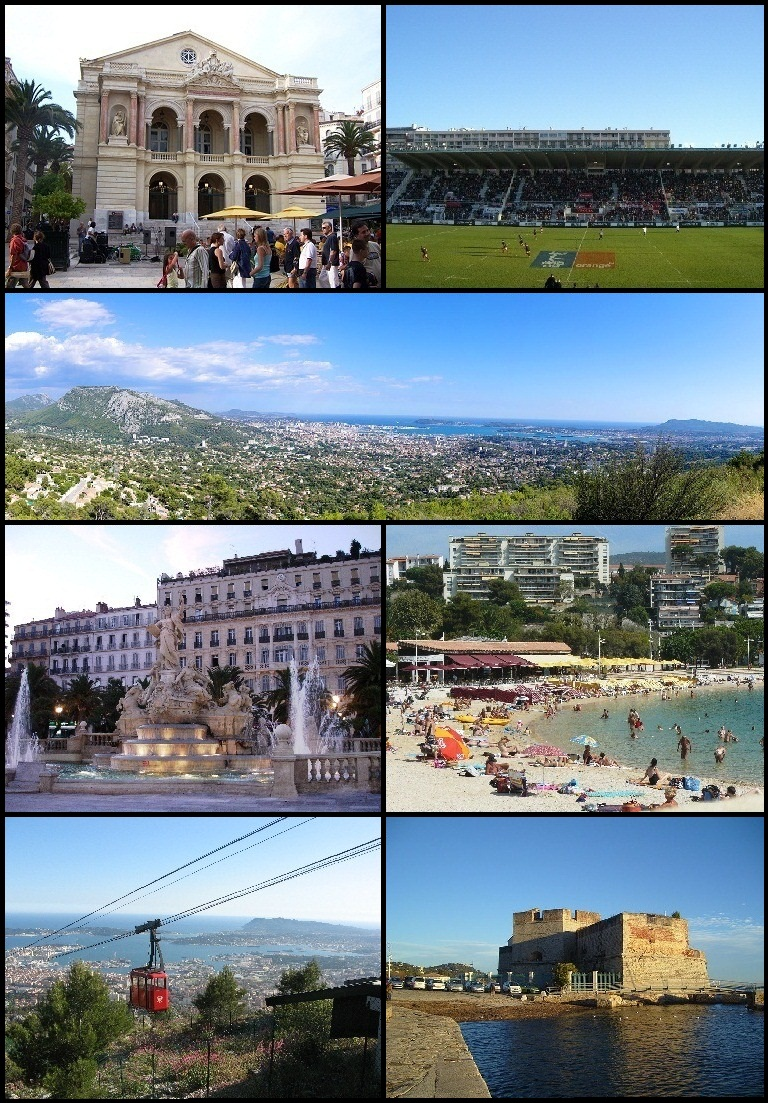
- Top left: Toulon Opera House, top right: Mayol Stadium (Le Stade du Mayol), 2nd: panoramic view of downtown Toulon and its port, 3rd left: Place de la Liberté, 3rd right: the beaches of Mourillon, bottom left: the cable car to Mount Faron, bottom right: Fort Saint-Louis

- Flag Coat of arms
- Location of Toulon
- Location within France Location within Provence-Alpes-Côte d'Azur
- Coordinates: 43°07′33″N 05°55′50″E
- Country: France
- Region: Provence-Alpes-Côte d'Azur
- Department: Var
- Arrondissement: Toulon
- Canton: Toulon-1, 2, 3 and 4
- Intercommunality: Métropole Toulon Provence Méditerranée

Government
  - Mayor (2026–32): Josée Massi
- Area^{1}: 42.84 km^{2} (16.54 sq mi)
  - Urban (2020): 764 km^{2} (295 sq mi)
  - Metro (2020): 1,004 km^{2} (388 sq mi)
- Elevation: 1 m (3.3 ft)
- Highest elevation: 589 m (1,932 ft)
- Lowest elevation: 0 m (0 ft)
- Population (2023): 179,116
  - Density: 4,181/km^{2} (10,830/sq mi)
  - Urban (2023): 603,708
  - Urban density: 790/km^{2} (2,050/sq mi)
  - Metro (2023): 591,135
  - Metro density: 588.8/km^{2} (1,525/sq mi)
- Demonym: Toulonnais
- Time zone: UTC+01:00 (CET)
  - Summer (DST): UTC+02:00 (CEST)
- INSEE/Postal code: 83137 /83000
- ^{1} French Land Register data, which excludes lakes, ponds, glaciers > 1 km^{2} (0.386 sq mi or 247 acres) and river estuaries.

Toulon (UK: /ˈtuːlɒ̃/, US: /tuːˈloʊn, -ˈlɔːn, -ˈlɒn/; French: [tulɔ̃]; Provençal: Tolon (classical norm), Touloun (Mistralian norm), pronounced [tuˈlun]) is a city in the Provence-Alpes-Côte d'Azur region of southeastern France. Located on the French Riviera at the eastern extremity of the Gulf of Lion, it formed part of the historical region of Provence. The city functions as the prefecture of the Var department.

Toulon had a population of 179,116 people (2023), making it France's 12th-largest city, and third most populous French city on the Mediterranean, after Marseille and Nice. It is the centre of a metropolitan area with 591,135 inhabitants (2023), the fourteenth largest in France by population.

Toulon is an important centre for naval construction, fishing, winemaking, and the manufacture of aeronautical equipment, armaments, maps, paper, tobacco, printing, shoes, and electronic equipment.

The military port of Toulon is the major naval centre on France's Mediterranean coast, home of the French aircraft carrier Charles de Gaulle and her battle group. The French Mediterranean Fleet is based in Toulon. The 1793 siege took place during the Federalist revolts.

== History ==
=== Prehistory to the Roman era ===
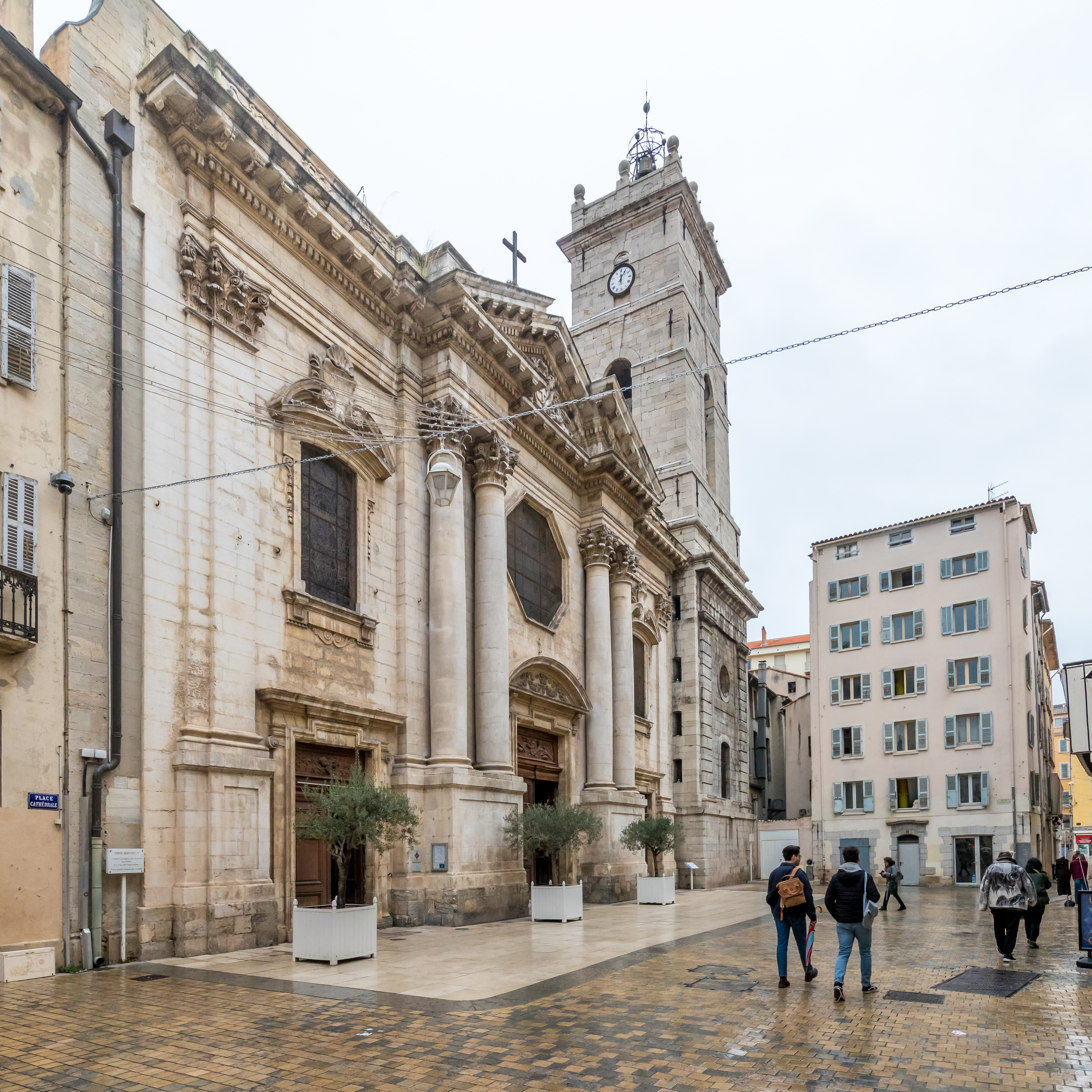
Toulon Cathedral (11th to 18th centuries)

Archaeological excavations, such as those at the Cosquer Cave near Marseille, show that the coast of Provence was inhabited since at least the Paleolithic era. Greek colonists came from Phocaea, Asia Minor, in about the 7th century BC and established trading depots along the coast, including one, called Olbia, at Saint-Pierre de l'Almanarre south of Hyères, to the east of Toulon. The Ligurians settled in the area beginning in the 4th century BC.

In the 2nd century BC, the residents of Massalia (present-day Marseille) called upon the Romans to help them pacify the region. The Romans defeated the Ligurians and began to start their own colonies along the coast. A Roman settlement was founded at the present location of Toulon, with the name Telo Martius – Telo, either for the local god of springs Telo or from the Latin tol, the base of the hill – and Martius, for the god of war. Telo Martius became one of the two principal Roman dye manufacturing centres, producing the purple colour used in imperial robes, made from the local sea snail called murex, and from the acorns of the oak trees. Toulon harbour became a shelter for trading ships, and the name of the town gradually changed from Telo to Tholon, Tolon, and Toulon.

=== Arrival of Christianity and the Counts of Provence ===
Toulon was Christianized in the 5th century, and the first cathedral built. Honoratus and Gratianus of Toulon (Gratien), according to the Gallia Christiana, were the first bishops of Toulon, but Louis Duchesne gives Augustalis as the first historical bishop. He assisted at councils in 441 and 442 and signed in 449 and 450 the letters addressed to Pope Leo I from the province of Arles.

A Saint Cyprian, disciple and biographer of St. Cæsarius of Arles, is also mentioned as a Bishop of Toulon. His episcopate, begun in 524, had not come to an end in 541; he converted to Catholicism two Visigothic chiefs, Mandrier and Flavian, who became anchorites and martyrs on the peninsula of Mandrier. As barbarians invaded the region and Roman power crumbled, the town was frequently attacked by pirates and the Saracens.

=== Royal port (15th–18th centuries) ===
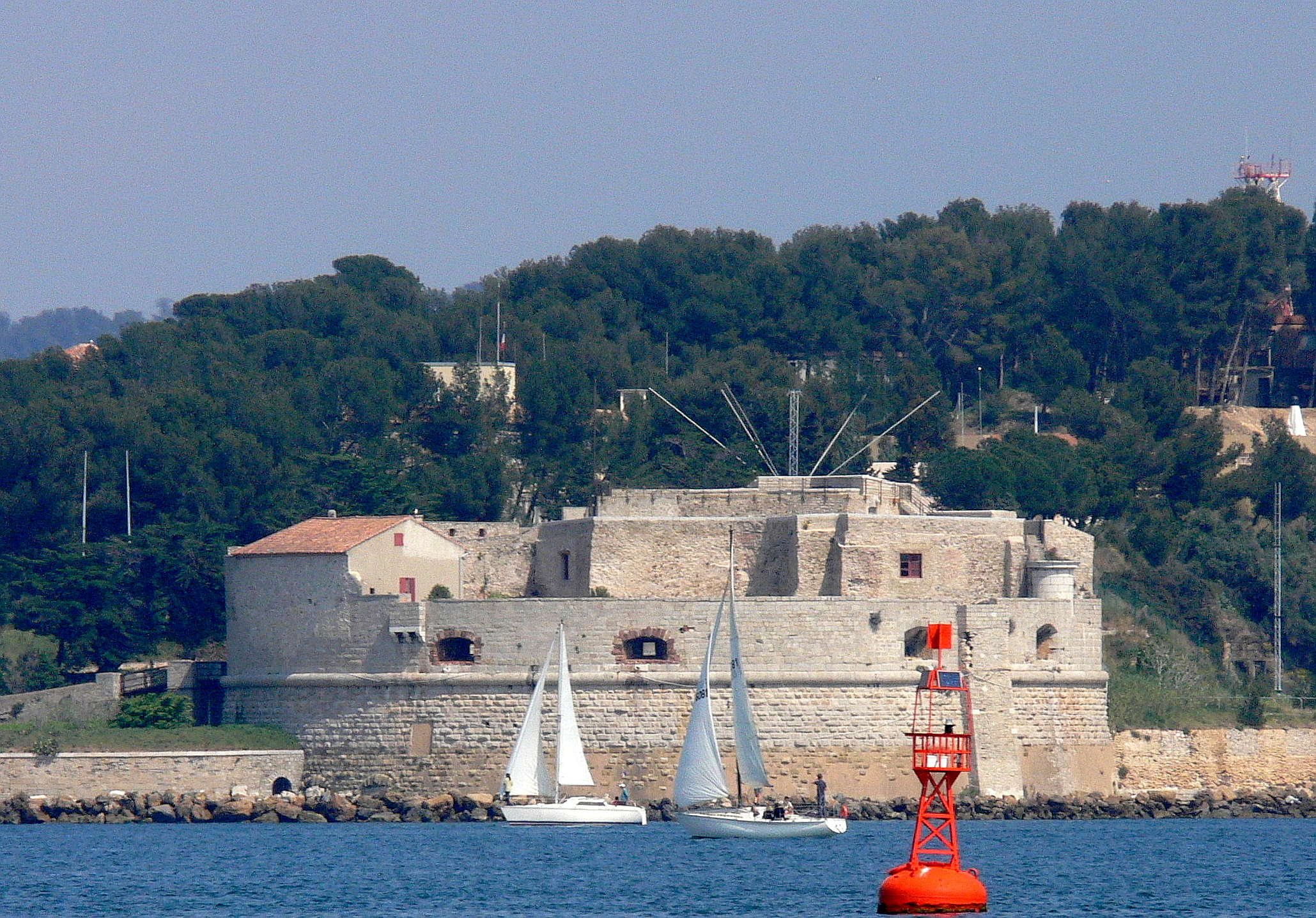
The Tour Royale (16th century)

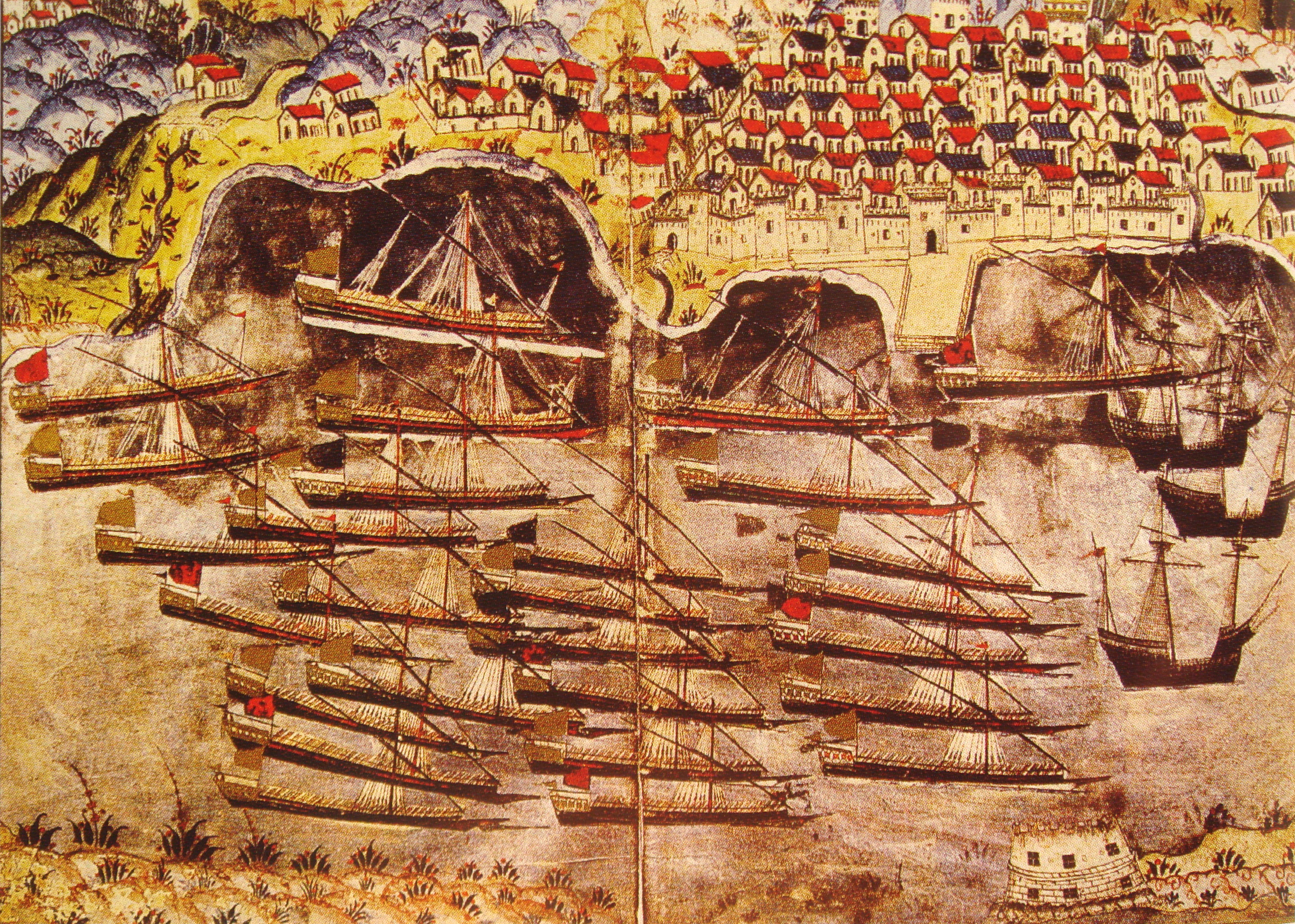
Barbarossa's Ottoman fleet, of the Regency of Algiers, wintering in the harbour of Toulon in 1543, with the Tour Royale (bottom right).

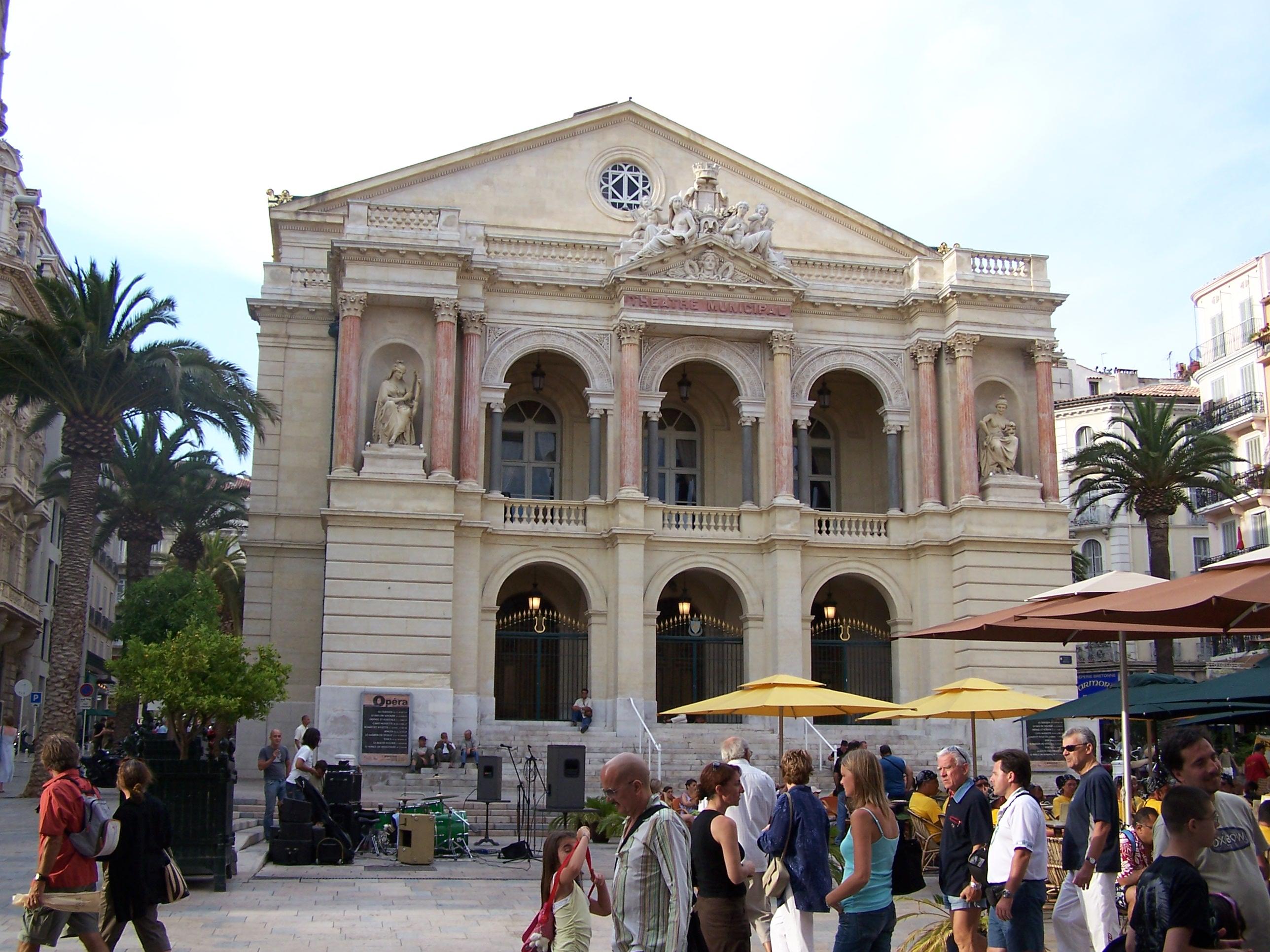
The Toulon Opera House (1862)

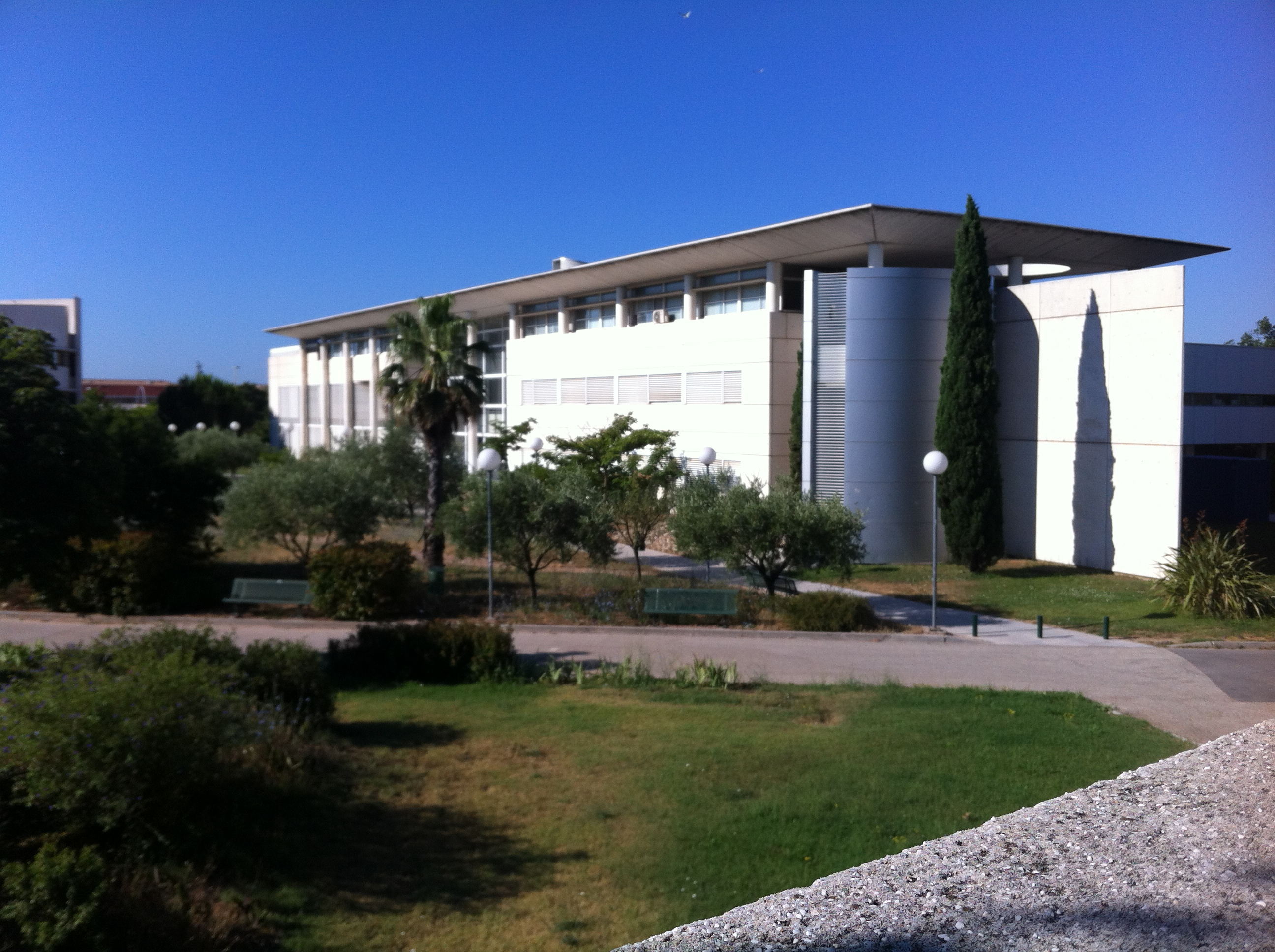
A view of the University campus

In 1486, Provence became part of France. Soon afterwards, in 1494, Charles VIII of France, with the intention of making France a sea power on the Mediterranean, and to support his military campaign in Italy, began constructing a military port at the harbor of Toulon. His Italian campaign failed, and in 1497, the rulers of Genoa, who controlled commerce on that part of the Mediterranean, blockaded the new port.

In 1524, as part of his longtime battle against Emperor Charles V and the Holy Roman Empire, King François I of France completed a powerful new fort, the Tour Royale, Toulon, at the entrance of the harbour. However, a few months later the commander of the new fort sold it to the commander of an Army of the Holy Roman Empire, and Toulon surrendered.

In 1543, Francis I found a surprising new ally in his battle against the Holy Roman Empire. He invited the fleet of Ottoman Admiral Barbarossa to Toulon as part of the Franco-Ottoman alliance. The residents were forced to leave (except for the heads of household), and the Ottoman sailors occupied the town for the winter. See Ottoman occupation of Toulon.

In 1646, a fleet was gathered in Toulon for the major Battle of Orbetello, also known as the Battle of Isola del Giglio, commanded by France's first Grand Admiral, the young Grand Admiral Marquis of Brézé, Jean Armand de Maillé-Bréze of 36 galleons, 20 galleys, and a large complement of minor vessels. This fleet carried aboard an army of 8,000 infantry and 800 cavalry and its baggage under Thomas of Savoy, shortly before a general in Spanish service.

King Louis XIV was determined to make France a major sea power. In 1660, his Minister Jean-Baptiste Colbert ordered Sébastien Le Prestre de Vauban to build a new arsenal and to fortify the town. In 1707, during the War of the Spanish Succession, Toulon successfully resisted a siege by the Imperial Army led by Duke Victor Amadeus II of Sardinia of Savoy and Prince Eugene. However, in 1720, the city was ravaged by the black plague, coming from Marseille. 13,000 people, or half the population, died.

In 1790, following the French Revolution, Toulon became the administrative centre of the département of the Var. However, in 1793, the Jacobin administration of the city was swept from power, allowing Girondins and royalists to take their place; the city then rose up against the central administration of the First Republic and joined the Federalist revolts. The new Federalist administration surrendered the city and its fleet to the British. French Republican forces then undertook the siege of Toulon, forcing the British to withdraw, taking a number of ships with them and destroying the rest of them. Napoleon Bonaparte served as an artillery captain during the event. To punish Toulon for its rebellion, the town lost its status as department capital and was briefly renamed Port-la-Montagne, after The Mountain faction.

=== 19th century ===
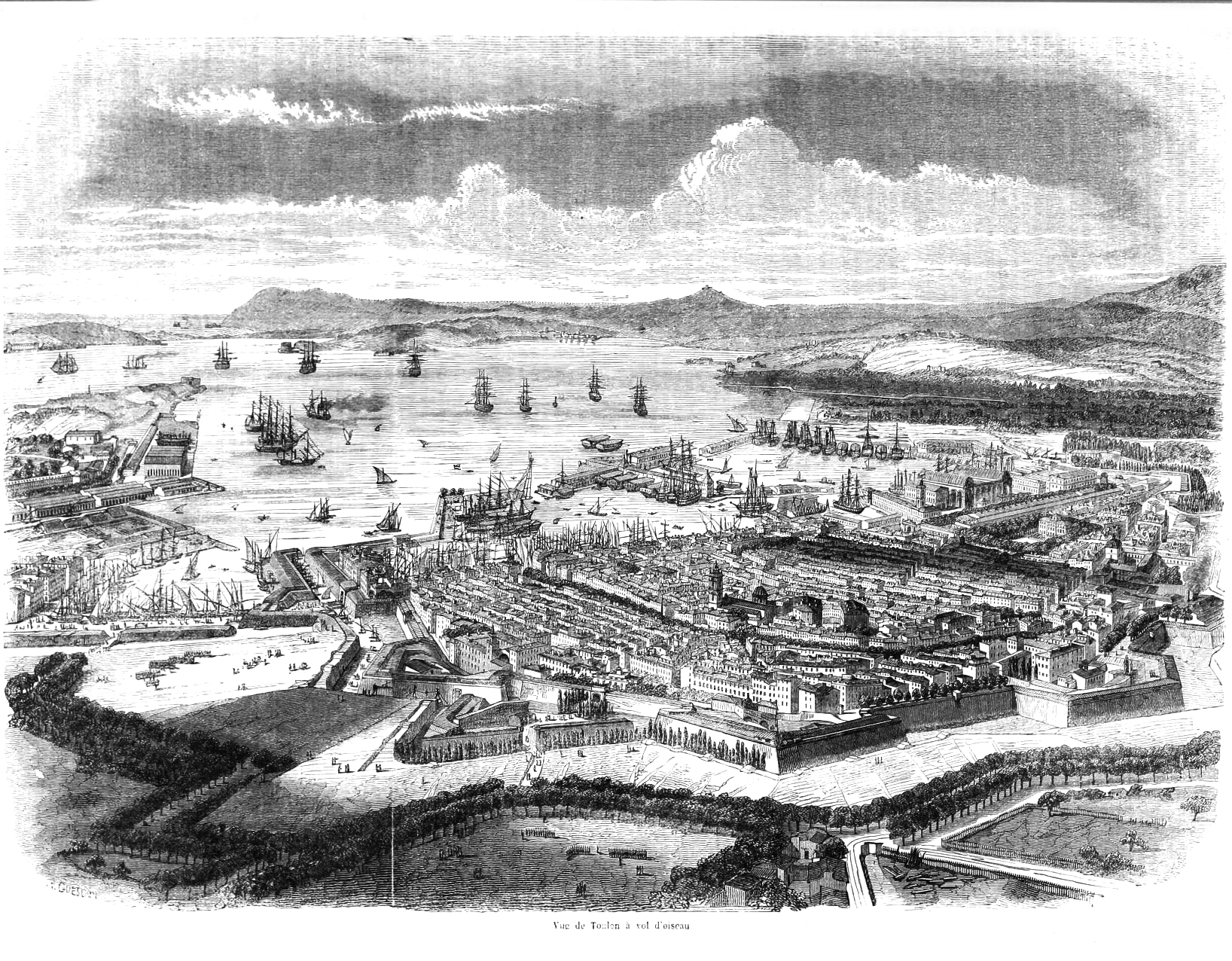
View in 1850

During the Napoleonic Wars, from 1803 until 1805 a British fleet led by Admiral Horatio Nelson blockaded Toulon.

In 1820, the statue which became known as the Venus de Milo was discovered on the Greek island of Milo and seen by a French naval officer, Emile Voutier. He persuaded the French Ambassador to Turkey to buy it, and brought it to Toulon on his ship, the Estafette. From Toulon it was taken to the Louvre.

In 1849, Louis-Napoleon named Georges Eugène Haussmann as the new Prefect of the Var department. He served there only one year, but he laid out the current street plan for the city center, as he would later do for the city of Paris.

In the 1890s, there were the Kronstadt-Toulon naval visits. were reciprocal diplomatic visits carried out by the French and Russian navies in the lead up to the Franco-Russian Alliance (1894–1917).

=== 20th century ===
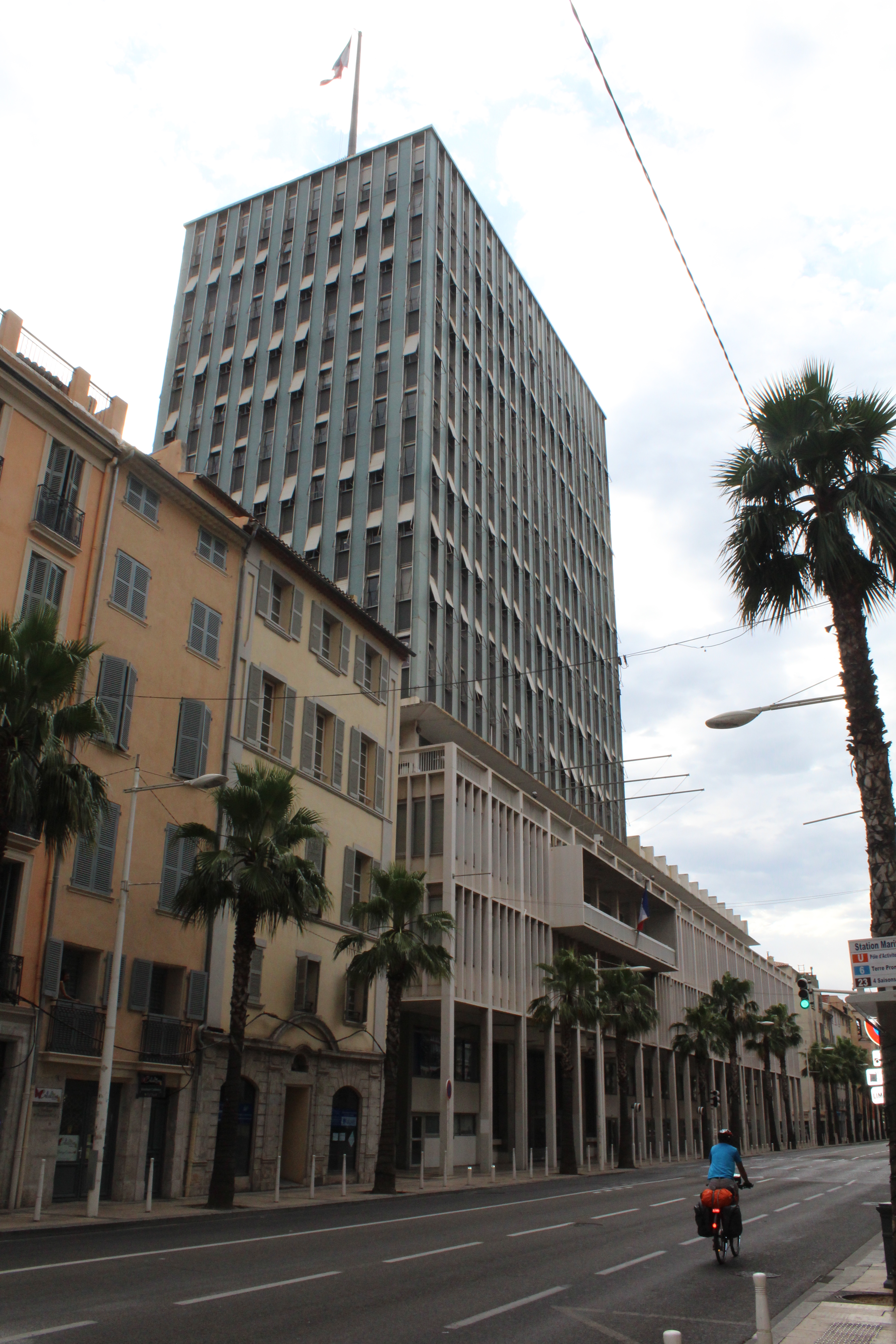
Hôtel de Ville

In August 1935, a year before the reign of the Popular Front, violent uprisings of the workers of the Toulon shipyards opposed the policy of austerity. This resulted in a large number of deaths and injuries; a state of emergency was imposed.

During World War II, after the Allied landings in North Africa (Operation Torch) the German Army occupied southern France (Case Anton), leading French naval officers to scuttle the French Fleet based at Toulon on 27 November 1942. The city was bombed by the Allies in November of the following year, with much of the port destroyed and five hundred residents killed.

The Hôtel de Ville, centre of the administration of the city, was completed in 1970.

In 1979, the University of Toulon opened. Toulon was one of four French cities where the extreme-right Front National won the local elections in 1995. The Front National was voted out of power in 2001.

== Main sights ==
=== Old Town ===
The old town of Toulon, the historic centre between the port, the Boulevard de Strasbourg and the Cours Lafayette, is a pedestrian area with narrow streets, small squares and many fountains. Toulon Cathedral is there. The area is also home of the celebrated Provençal market, which takes place every morning on the Cours Lafayette and features local products. The old town decayed in the 1980s and 1990s, but recently many of the fountains and squares have been restored and many new shops have opened.

=== Fountains of Old Toulon ===
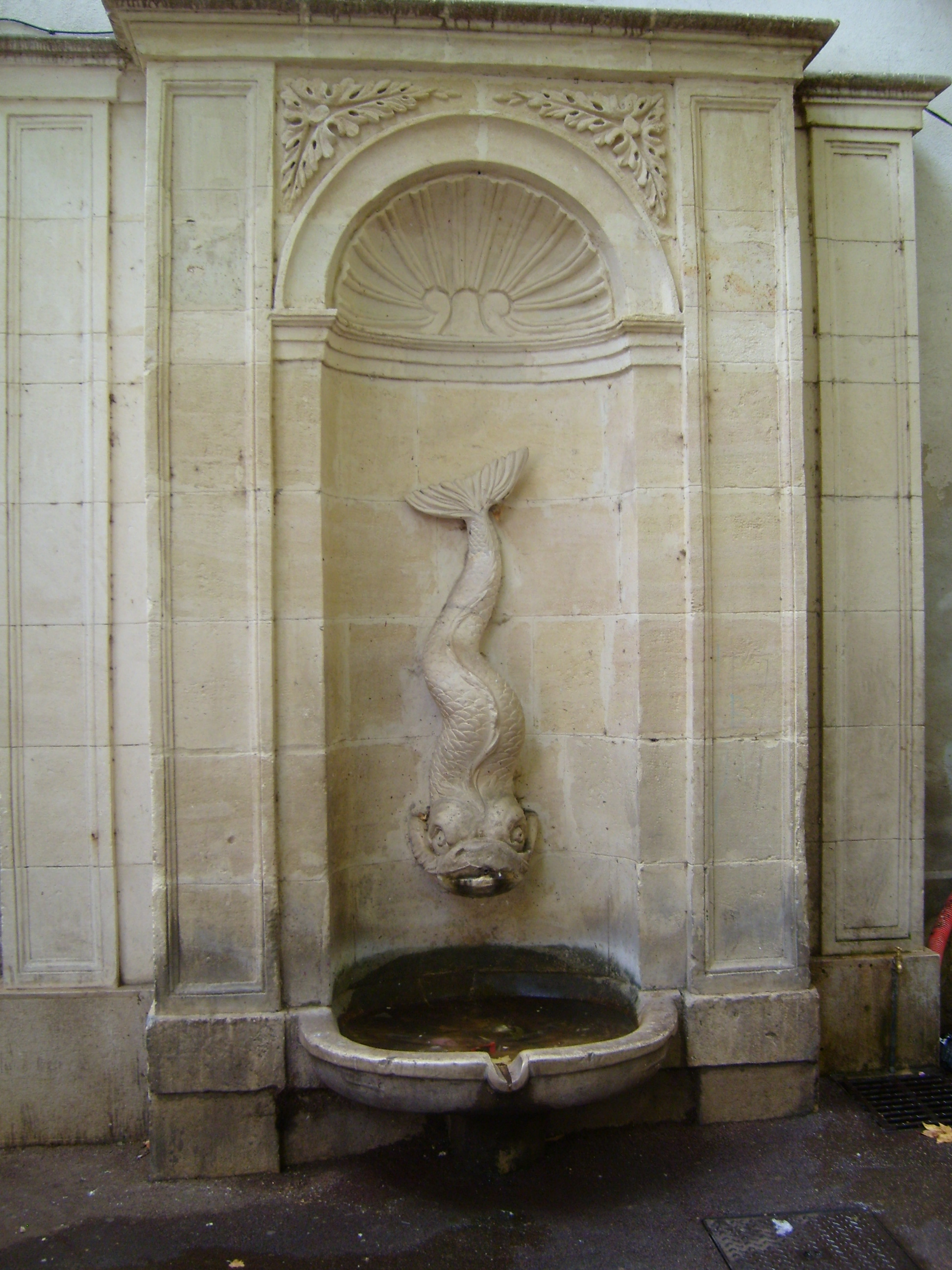
Fontaine du Dauphin, Place Paul Comte. The fountain, on the wall of the Bishop's residence, appears in the drawings of Toulon made for Louis XIV in 1668.

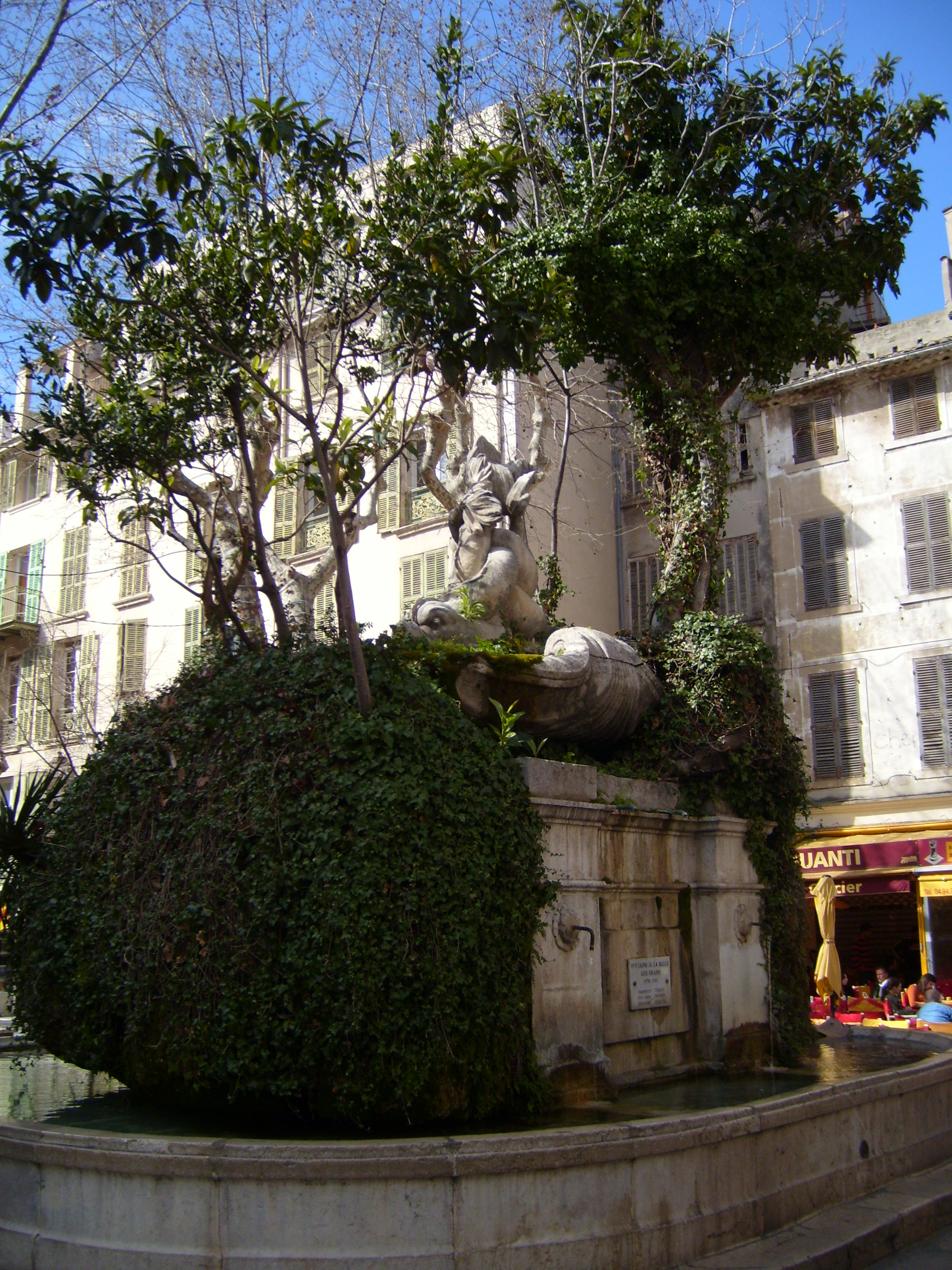
Fontaine des Trois Dauphins, Place Puget (1782)

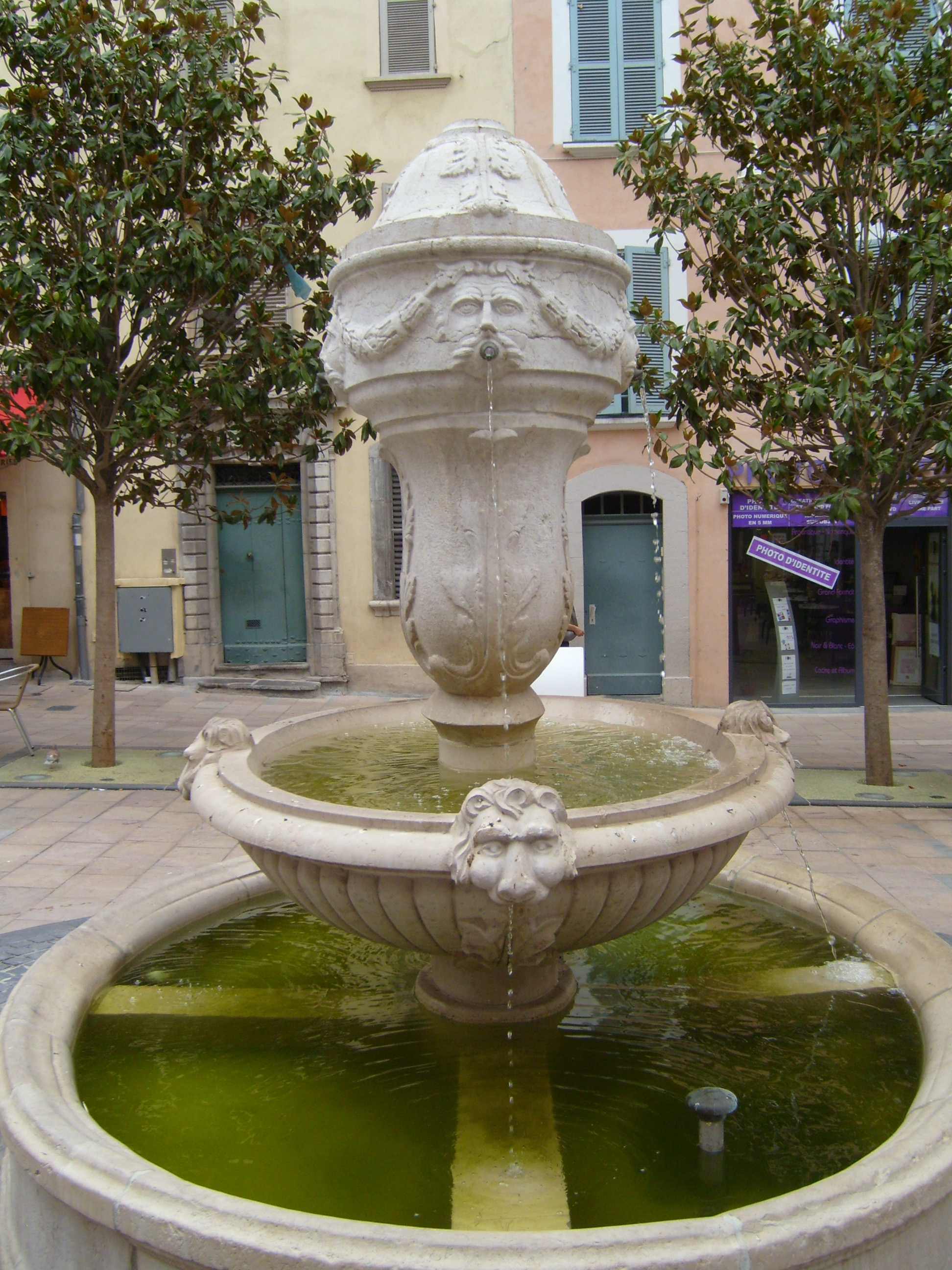
Fontaine de l'Intendance, Place Amiral Sénès, (1821)

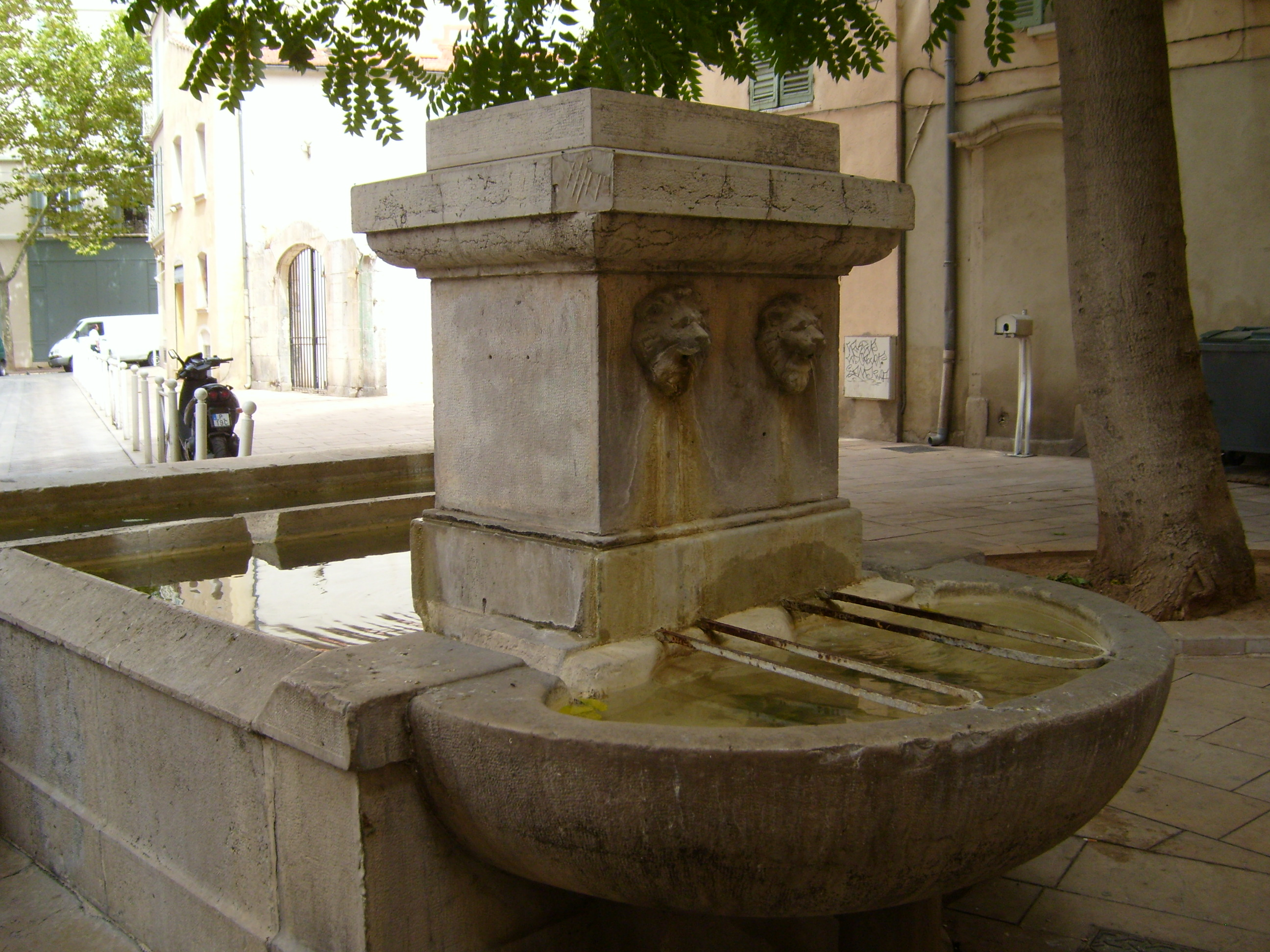
The Fontaine-Lavoir de Saint-Vincent, Place Saint-Vincent (1832), replaced the original fountain built in 1615. It had a fountain for drinking water and two basins, for washing clothes, one for washing and one for rinsing.

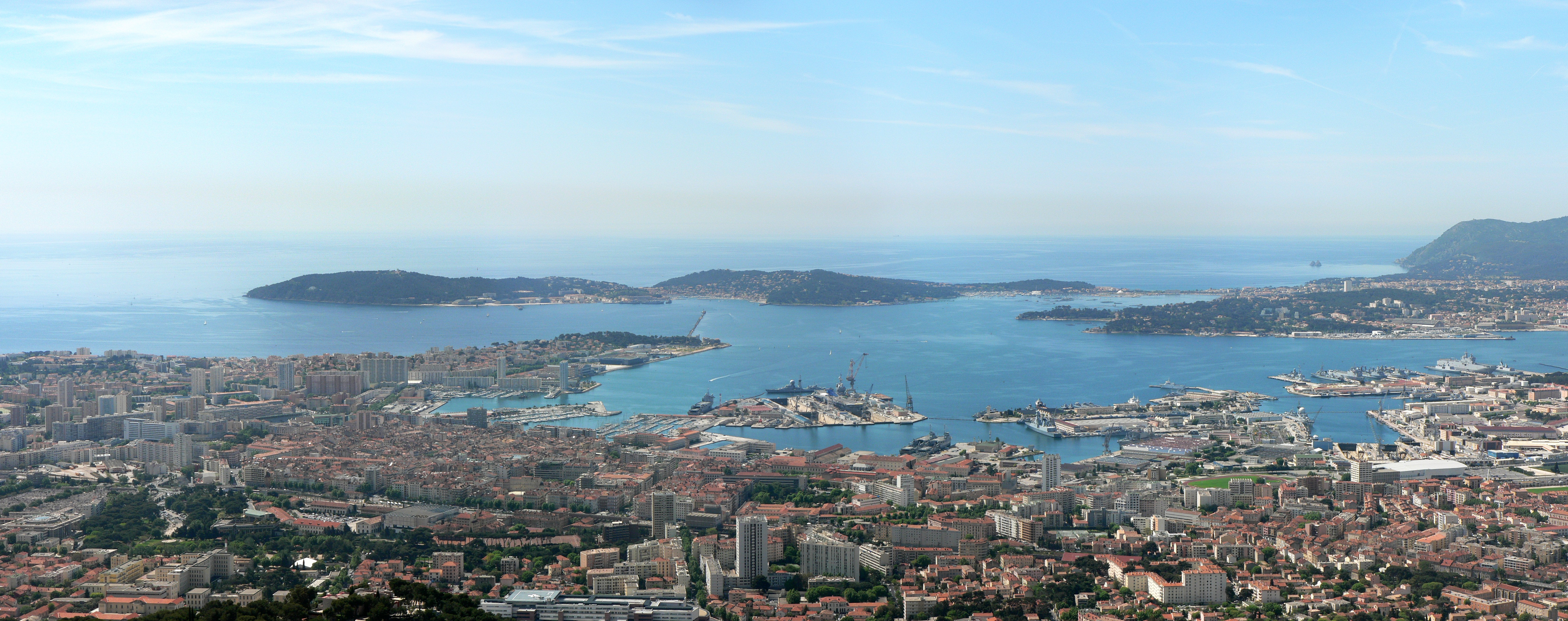
View of downtown Toulon and Mediterranean Sea from Mount Faron

The Old Town of Toulon is known for its fountains, found in many of the small squares, each with a different character. The original system of fountains was built in the late 17th century; most were rebuilt in the 18th or early 19th century and have recently been restored.

=== Upper Town of Georges-Eugène Haussmann ===
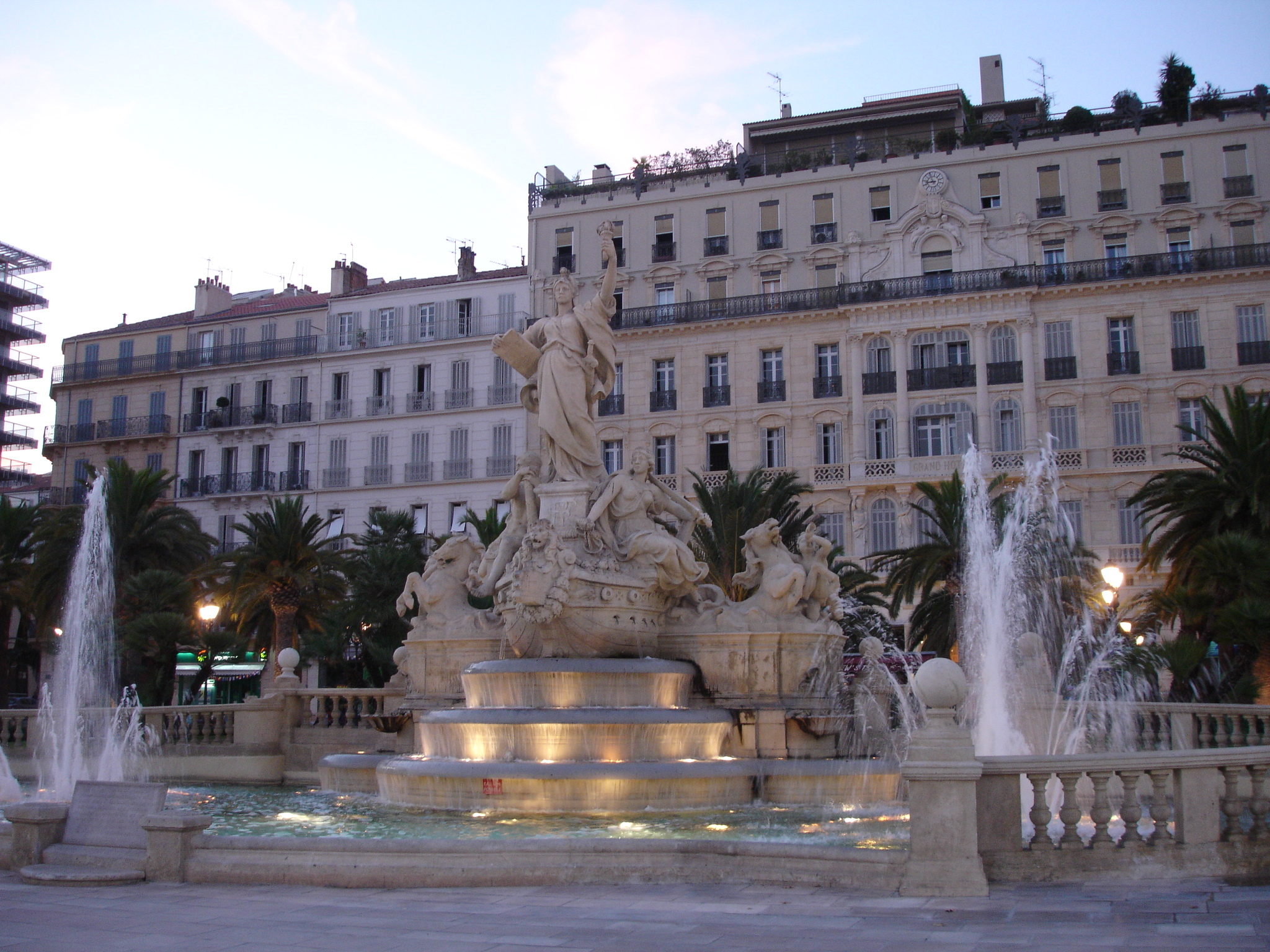
Place de la Liberté.

The upper town, between the Boulevard de Strasbourg and the railway station, was built in the mid-19th century under Louis Napoleon. The project was begun by Georges-Eugène Haussmann, who was prefect of the Var in 1849. Improvements to the neighbourhood included the Toulon Opera, the Place de la Liberté, the Grand Hôtel, the Gardens of Alexander I, the Chalucet Hospital, the Palais de Justice, the train station, and the building now occupied by Galeries Lafayette, among others. Haussmann went on to use the same style on a much grander scale in the rebuilding of central Paris.

=== Harbour and Arsenal ===
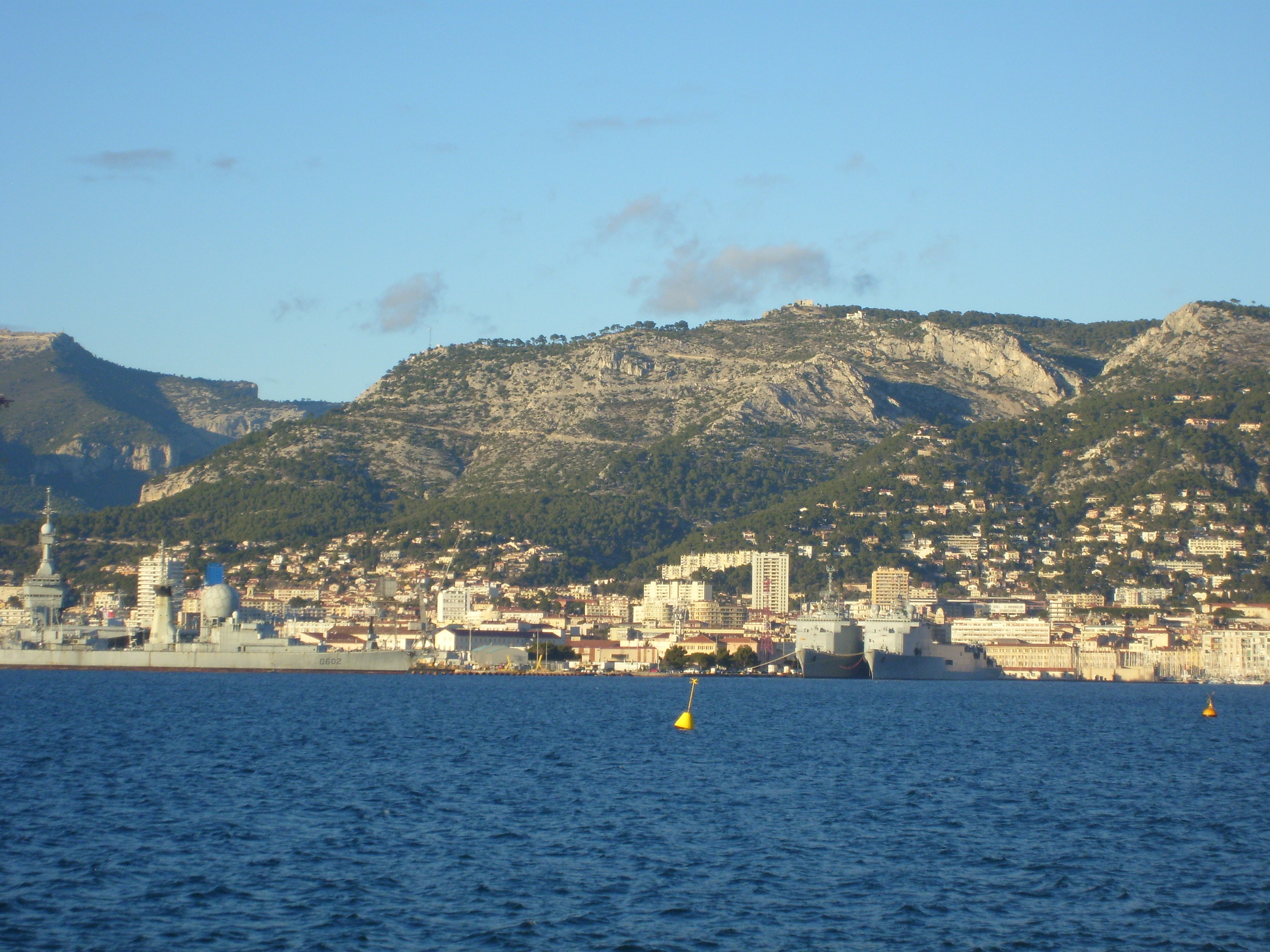
View of Toulon, the Arsenal and Mount Faron from the Harbour.

Toulon harbour is one of the best natural anchorages on the Mediterranean and one of the largest harbours in Europe. A naval arsenal and shipyard was built in 1599, and a small sheltered harbour, the Veille Darse, was built in 1604–1610 to protect ships from the wind and sea. The shipyard was greatly enlarged by Cardinal Richelieu, who wished to make France a Mediterranean naval power. Further additions were made by Jean-Baptiste Colbert and Vauban.

=== Le Mourillon ===
Le Mourillon is a small seaside neighbourhood to the east of Toulon, near the entrance of the harbour. It was once a fishing village, and then became the home of many of the officers of the French fleet. Mourillon has a small fishing port, next to a 16th-century fort, Fort Saint Louis, which was reconstructed by Vauban. In the 1970s, the city of Toulon built a series of sheltered sandy beaches in Mourillon, which today are very popular with the Toulonnais and naval families. The Museum of Asian Art is in a house on the waterfront near Fort St. Louis.

=== Mount Faron ===
Mount Faron (584 metres (1,916 feet)) dominates the city of Toulon. The top can be reached by cable car from Toulon or by a narrow road that ascends from the west side and descends on the east side. The road is one of the stages of the annual Paris–Nice and Tour Méditerranéen bicycle races.

At the top of Mount Faron is a memorial dedicated to the 1944 Allied landings in Provence (Operation Dragoon), and to the liberation of Toulon.

=== Vauban's fortifications ===
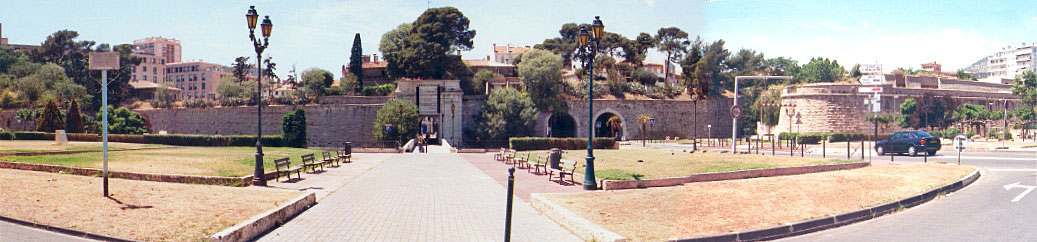
The Porte d'Italie, built by Vauban. Napoleon departed from this gate in 1796 on his Italian campaign.

Beginning in 1678, Vauban constructed an elaborate system of fortifications around Toulon. Some parts, such as the section that once ran along the present-day Boulevard de Strasbourg, were removed in the mid-19th century so the city could be enlarged, but other parts remain. One part that can be visited is the Porte d'Italie, one of the old city gates. Napoleon Bonaparte departed on his triumphant Italian campaign from this gate in 1796.

=== Museums ===
Toulon has a number of museums.

The Museum of the French Navy (Musée national de la marine) is located on Place Monsenergue, next on the west side of the old port, a short distance from the Hôtel de Ville. The museum was founded in 1814, during the reign of the Emperor Napoleon. It is located today behind what was formerly the monumental gate to the Arsenal of Toulon, built in 1738. The museum building, along with the clock tower next to it, is one of the few buildings of the port and arsenal which survived Allied bombardments during World War II. It contains displays tracing the history of Toulon as a port of the French Navy. Highlights include large 18th-century ship models used to teach seamanship and models of the aircraft carrier Charles De Gaulle.

The Museum of Old Toulon and its Region (Musée du vieux Toulon et de sa région). The Museum was founded in 1912, and contains a collection of maps, paintings, drawings, models and other artifacts showing the history of the city.

The Museum of Asian Arts (Musée des arts asiatiques), in Mourillon. Located in a house with garden which once belonged to the son and later the grandson of author Jules Verne, the museum contains a small but interesting collection of art objects, many donated by naval officers from the time of the French colonization of Southeast Asia. It includes objects and paintings from India, China, Southeast Asia, China Tibet and Japan.

The Museum of Art (Musée d'art) was created in 1888, and contains collections of modern and contemporary art, as well as paintings of Provence from the 17th century to the beginning of the 20th century. It owns works by landscape artists of Provence from the late 19th century (Paul Guigou, Auguste Aiguier, Vincent Courdouan, Félix Ziem), and the Fauves of Provence (Charles Camoin, Auguste Chabaud, Louis Mathieu Verdilhan). The contemporary collections contain works from 1960 to today representing the New Realism Movement (Arman, César, Christo, Klein, Raysse); Minimalist Art (Sol LeWitt, Donald Judd); Support Surface (Cane, Viallat côtoient Arnal, Buren, Chacallis) and an important collection of photographs by Henri Cartier-Bresson, Dieuzaide, Edouard Boubat, Willy Ronis and André Kertész).

The Memorial Museum to the Landings in Provence (Mémorial du débarquement de Provence) is located on the summit of Mount Faron, this small museum, opened in 1964 by President Charles De Gaulle, commemorates the Allied landing in Provence in August 1944 with photos, weapons and models.

The Museum of Natural History of Toulon and the Var (Musée d'histoire naturelle de Toulon et du Var) was founded in 1888, has a large collection of displays about dinosaurs, birds, mammals, and minerals, mostly from the region.

The Hôtel des arts was opened in 1998, presents five exhibits a year of works by well-known contemporary artists. Featured artists have included Sean Scully, Jannis Kounellis, Claude Viallat, Per Kirkeby, and Vik Muniz.

=== Other points of interest ===
- Jardin d'acclimatation du Mourillon
- Tour Royale, Toulon

== Climate ==
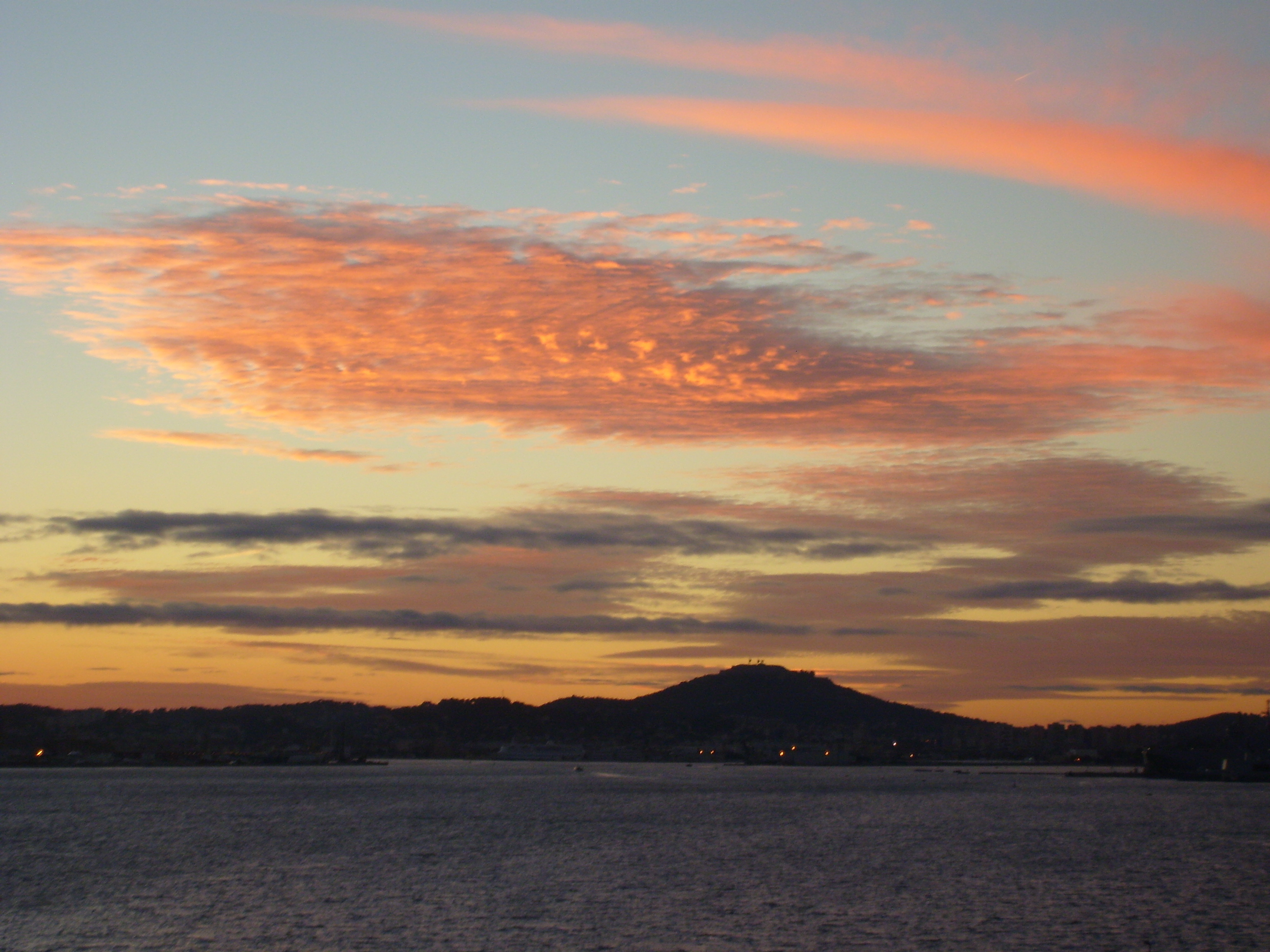
The Harbour at Sunset

Toulon is subtropical, featuring a Mediterranean climate (Köppen climate classification: Csa), characterised by abundant and strong sunshine, dry summers, and rain which is rare but sometimes torrential; and by hot summers and mild winters. Because of its proximity to the sea, the temperature is relatively moderate.

The average temperature in January, the coldest month, is 9.9 °C (50 °F), the warmest of any city in metropolitan France. In January, the maximum average temperature is 13.2 °C (56 °F). and the average minimum temperature is 6.6 °C (44 °F).

The average temperature in July, the warmest month, is 24.7 °C (76 °F), with an average maximum of 29.5 °C (85 °F). and an average minimal temperature of 19.9 °C (68 °F).

According to data collected by Météo-France, Toulon is the second city (after Marseille) in metropolitan France with the most sunshine per year: an average of 2,854.1 hours a year from 1991 to 2020, compared with 2,695 hours a year for Nice and 2,472 hours for Perpignan. This is due to the wall of mountains that largely protects Toulon from the weather coming from the north. With a yearly average temperature of 16.7 °C (62 °F), it is also one of the warmest cities in metropolitan France.

One distinctive feature of the Toulon climate is the wind, with 115 days a year of strong winds; usually either the cold and dry Mistral or the Tramontane from the north, the wet Marin; or the Sirocco sometimes bearing reddish sand from Africa; or the wet and stormy Levant from the east. (See Winds of Provence.) The windiest month is January, with an average of 12.5 days of strong winds. The least windy month is September, with 7 days of strong winds.

Climate data for Toulon, elevation: 3 m (9.8 ft) (1991–2020 normals, extremes 1936–present)
Month	Jan	Feb	Mar	Apr	May	Jun	Jul	Aug	Sep	Oct	Nov	Dec	Year
Record high °C (°F)	20.9 (69.6)	23.2 (73.8)	26.4 (79.5)	28.1 (82.6)	34.7 (94.5)	36.0 (96.8)	40.1 (104.2)	37.0 (98.6)	34.9 (94.8)	29.3 (84.7)	24.2 (75.6)	21.9 (71.4)	40.1 (104.2)
Mean daily maximum °C (°F)	13.2 (55.8)	13.8 (56.8)	16.4 (61.5)	18.8 (65.8)	22.6 (72.7)	26.8 (80.2)	29.5 (85.1)	29.8 (85.6)	25.9 (78.6)	21.4 (70.5)	16.8 (62.2)	13.9 (57.0)	20.7 (69.3)
Daily mean °C (°F)	9.9 (49.8)	10.1 (50.2)	12.4 (54.3)	14.7 (58.5)	18.3 (64.9)	22.2 (72.0)	24.7 (76.5)	25.0 (77.0)	21.5 (70.7)	17.8 (64.0)	13.5 (56.3)	10.7 (51.3)	16.7 (62.1)
Mean daily minimum °C (°F)	6.6 (43.9)	6.3 (43.3)	8.4 (47.1)	10.5 (50.9)	13.9 (57.0)	17.5 (63.5)	19.9 (67.8)	20.2 (68.4)	17.1 (62.8)	14.1 (57.4)	10.1 (50.2)	7.5 (45.5)	12.7 (54.9)
Record low °C (°F)	−7.2 (19.0)	−9 (16)	−4.3 (24.3)	0.3 (32.5)	4.6 (40.3)	9.0 (48.2)	12.8 (55.0)	12.3 (54.1)	8.4 (47.1)	3.2 (37.8)	−0.9 (30.4)	−4.5 (23.9)	−9 (16)
Average precipitation mm (inches)	70.5 (2.78)	46.8 (1.84)	39.0 (1.54)	55.4 (2.18)	40.2 (1.58)	27.0 (1.06)	6.2 (0.24)	13.4 (0.53)	69.9 (2.75)	105.8 (4.17)	93.4 (3.68)	65.8 (2.59)	633.4 (24.94)
Average precipitation days (≥ 1.0 mm)	6.0	5.6	4.8	6.0	4.3	2.7	0.9	1.6	4.5	6.8	7.9	6.3	57.5
Mean monthly sunshine hours	146.0	166.3	219.3	262.3	303.4	337.7	379.4	333.5	266.8	207.2	155.2	143.1	2,920.2
Source 1: Meteo France
Source 2: Infoclimat (sunshine hours)

== Population ==
Historical population

Year	Pop.	±% p.a.
1793	19,000	—
1800	22,000	+2.12%
1806	28,170	+4.21%
1821	30,798	+0.60%
1831	33,885	+0.96%
1836	35,322	+0.83%
1841	45,449	+5.17%
1846	62,941	+6.73%
1851	69,474	+1.99%
1856	83,705	+3.80%
1861	84,601	+0.21%
1866	77,126	−1.83%
1872	74,800	−0.51%
1876	70,509	−1.47%
1881	70,103	−0.12%
1886	70,122	+0.01%
1891	77,747	+2.09%
1896	95,276	+4.15%
1901	101,602	+1.29%

Year	Pop.	±% p.a.
1906	103,549	+0.38%
1911	104,582	+0.20%
1921	106,331	+0.17%
1926	115,120	+1.60%
1931	133,263	+2.97%
1936	150,310	+2.44%
1946	125,742	−1.77%
1954	141,117	+1.45%
1962	161,786	+1.72%
1968	174,746	+1.29%
1975	181,801	+0.57%
1982	179,423	−0.19%
1990	167,619	−0.85%
1999	160,639	−0.47%
2007	166,537	+0.45%
2012	164,899	−0.20%
2017	171,953	+0.84%
2023	179,116	+0.68%

Source: EHESS and INSEE (1968–2023)

== Education ==
Toulon has a conservatory (Conservatoire TPM, part of Conservatoire à rayonnement régional de Toulon) which teaches music, theater, dance and circus and an art academy called École supérieure d'art et de design Toulon Provence Méditerranée. Toulon is also home to a number of institutes of the University of Toulon, known until 2013 as University of the South, Toulon-Var. Toulon has a campus of KEDGE Business School.

== Literature ==
Toulon figures prominently in Victor Hugo's Les Misérables. It is the location of the infamous prison, the bagne of Toulon, in which the protagonist Jean Valjean spends nineteen years in hard labour. Toulon is also where Valjean first encounters the novel's antagonist, Javert. One portion of the wall of the old bagne, or prison, where Jean Valjean was supposedly held still stands to the right of the entrance of the Old Harbour.

In Anthony Powell's novel What's Become of Waring the central characters spend a long summer holiday in Toulon's old town. Powell himself stayed at the Hotel du Port et des Negociants on two occasions in the early 1930s and writes in the second volume of his memoirs The naval port, with its small inner harbour, row of cafés along the rade, was quite separate from the business quarter of the town. A paddle steamer plied several times a day between this roadstead and the agreeably unsophisticated plage of Les Sablettes.

Joseph Conrad's last novel, The Rover, is also set around Toulon.

The last half of Dewey Lambdin's historical fiction novel, H.M.S. Cockerel, (the sixth novel in his Alan Lewrie naval adventure series) details the Siege of Toulon from Lewrie's perspective, as he commands a commandeered French barge carrying sea mortars against Lieutenant-Colonel Bonaparte's forces.

== Transport ==
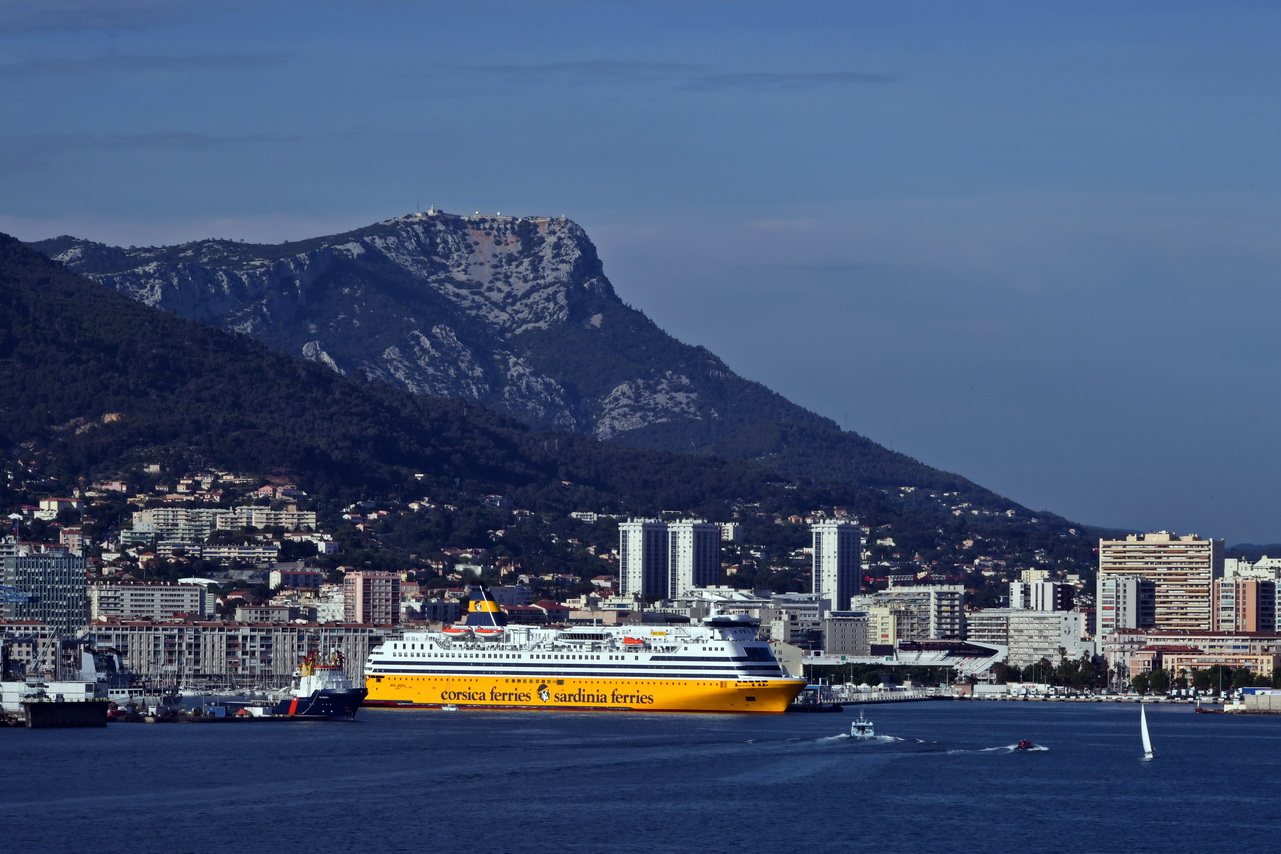
Harbor with ferry

Toulon is served by the Gare de Toulon railway station, offering suburban services to Marseille (1 train every 15 minutes during peak hours), regional services to Nice, and high speed connections to Paris, Strasburg, Luxembourg and Brussels. A daily night train also connects the city to Nice, Marseille and Paris.

The port of Toulon is the main port of departures for ferries to Corsica.

The nearest airport is the regional Toulon-Hyères Airport. The proximity of Marseille-Provence Airport located at 80 kms of the city, serving international destinations in Europe, Africa, Middle East, North America and Asia and linked to the city-center by direct trains daily offers a good international connectivity to the city.

The A50 autoroute connects Toulon to Marseille, the A57 autoroute runs from Toulon to Le Luc, where it connects to the A8 autoroute.

The local public transport service, Réseau Mistral de Toulon, operates 60 bus routes and three sea shuttle lines and is used by 30 million passengers annually.

== Gastronomy ==
Local food highlights include:

- cuisine from the Mediterranean and from Provence
- the cade toulonnaise, a local speciality composed of chickpea flour and which is equivalent to the Socca of Nice
- the Chichi Frégi, a type of donut from Provence.

== Sport ==
The most successful of the city's clubs are the rugby union team RC Toulon and the women's handball team Toulon St-Cyr Var Handball, both playing in the top division of their respective sports. The basketball team Hyères-Toulon Var Basket play in the second division of the French championship.

The city hosts the final four of the annual Toulon Tournament, an international under-21 football tournament.

Toulon's main football team is Sporting Club Toulon, which plays in Championnat National, the third level of French football. Famous players such as Delio Onnis, Jean Tigana, Christian Dalger, David Ginola and Sébastien Squillaci have all played for Sporting.

The city has been chosen by Groupama Team France as the venue for the fifth event in the Americas Cup World Series 2016, alongside international cities such as Portsmouth & New York.

The handball team Toulon St-Cyr Var Handball has won a single French Championship in 2010.

Club	Sport	League	Stadium
RC Toulon	Rugby union	Top 14	Stade Mayol
Toulon St-Cyr Var Handball	Handball	Championnat de France de handball féminin	Palais des Sports
Hyères-Toulon Var Basket	Basketball	LNB Pro A	Palais des Sports and Espace 3000
Sporting Club Toulon	Football	Championnat National	Stade de Bon Rencontre
Sporting Treiziste Toulonnais	Rugby league	National Division 1	Stade Delaune

== Notable residents ==
Toulon is the birthplace of:

- Jean Joseph Marie Amiot (1718–1793), Jesuit
- Gilbert Bécaud (1927–2001), singer
- Boris Bede (born 1989), gridiron football player
- Jean Blondel (1929–2022), political scientist
- Jacques Borsarello (born 1951), violist
- Robert Busnel (1914–1991), basketball player
- Capucine, actress
- François Étienne Victor de Clinchamp (1787–1880), painter and author
- Émile Colonne (1885–1990), operatic baritone
- Lúcio Costa (1902–1998), architect and urban planner
- Mireille Darc (1938–2017), actress
- Kaba Diawara (born 1975), footballer
- Christophe Dominici (1972–2020), French international rugby player
- Laurent Emmanuelli (born 1976), rugby player
- Matar Fall (born 1982), footballer
- Henri Ghys (1839–1908), composer and pianist
- Anne Golon (1921–2017), author, wrote a series of novels about a heroine Angélique
- Félix Édouard Guérin-Méneville (1799–1874), entomologist
- Josuha Guilavogui, footballer
- Loïc Jean-Albert (born 1978), expert parachuter
- Maryse Joissains-Masini (born 1942), Mayor of Aix-en-Provence
- Jacques Le Goff (1924–2014), historian
- Ève Lavallière (1866–1929), stage actress
- Félix Mayol (1872–1941), singer and entertainer, and namesake of RC Toulon's stadium
- Guy du Merle (1908–1993), aeronautical engineer, test pilot and writer
- Alain Mucchielli (born 1947), physician
- Sabine Paturel (born 1965), singer and actress
- Gabriel Péri (1902–1941), journalist and politician
- Raimu (1883–1946), actor
- LiLi Roquelin, singer-songwriter
- Brigitte Roüan (born 1946), film director and actress
- Bastien Salabanzi (born 1985), professional skateboarder
- Cyril Saulnier (born 1975), tennis player
- Sébastien Squillaci (born 1980), French international footballer
- Didier Tarquin (born 1967), cartoonist and scenarist
- Charles Thanaron (1809–1886), capitaine de frégate in the French Navy, member of Dumont d'Urville's second expedition
- Jean Tournier (1926–2004), cinematographer
- Joëlle Wintrebert (born 1949), writer

== International relations ==
Toulon is twinned with:

- La Spezia, Italy, since 1958
- Mannheim, Germany, since 1958
- Norfolk, United States, since 1988
- Kronstadt, Russia, since 1996

== See also ==
- Communes of the Var department
- Rafiot - a type of fishing vessel from Toulon
