= François Étienne Victor de Clinchamp =

French painter

François Étienne Victor de Clinchamp (20 October 1787 in Toulon – 22 September 1880 in Paris) was a French painter and writer.

== Biography ==
He was the son of Charles François René de Clinchamp, student of the Royal Military School, infantry captain, and of Claire Victoire Fortunée Bonnefoi. His family, one of the oldest in Normandy, had settled in Toulon. He married Alexandrine Françoise Crette de Palluel in Paris on August 21, 1820.

He was destined to a naval career, but his health failing he went to Paris, where he studied painting under Le Barbier and Peyron then with Girodet.

Nevertheless, he was called to direct the Toulon School of drawing of the Navy. He painted a considerable number of religious paintings for several churches in the South of France: Christ healing the Sick of the Palsy, The Sons of Zebedee, The Death of Phocion, The Baptism of Saint-Mandrier and a Crucifixion, which was his best exhibited work.

He has contributed to several newspapers, including the Ami du Bien of Marseille. He wrote some works on perspective, and several dramatic pieces. Around 1820 he invented a device named noctograph to allow blind people to read.

He took part in the Paris Salon in 1840 and 1841.

This tireless worker, moreover, found time, in the midst of the daily occupations to which he was condemned, to write a volume of fables, plays, memoirs on the theory and practice of painting and on aesthetics. Finally, this amiable artist, who remained young at heart, published, in his eighty-second year, a work of literature. He was for a long time a teacher of drawing at the Naval School; he gave up this position in 1824, the year in which the school was transferred to a port on the ocean. While he was practising his art in Toulon, many young people attended the workshop-school he ran, next to his private workshop, in his former heritage house located on the Cours Lafayette and bearing the number 68.

— Société de l'histoire de l'art français, "Archives de l'art français", Nouvelles archives de l'art français, 1894, pp.221-222 (on line on archive.org)

== Works ==
- Éléments de perspective linéaire et aérienne (Paris,1820)
- Nouveau traité de la perspective des ombres et de la théorie des reflets (Toulon, 1825)
- Recueil de Fables nouvelles (Toulon, 1829)
- Cours complet de perspective linéaire et aérienne (1840)
- Nouveau traité de la perspective linéaire, à l'usage des artistes et des écoles de dessin; dans lequel on trouvera les réflections des miroirs ... (in French). Carilian-Goeury. 1840.
- A collection of small society plays and dramas, Rodolphe de Vart, Christine à Fontainebleau, etc.

== Honours ==
Knight of the French Legion of Honour.

== Legacy ==
- A street is named after him in Toulon. (43°08′18″N 5°54′27″E)
