= Rafiot =

Fishing vessel

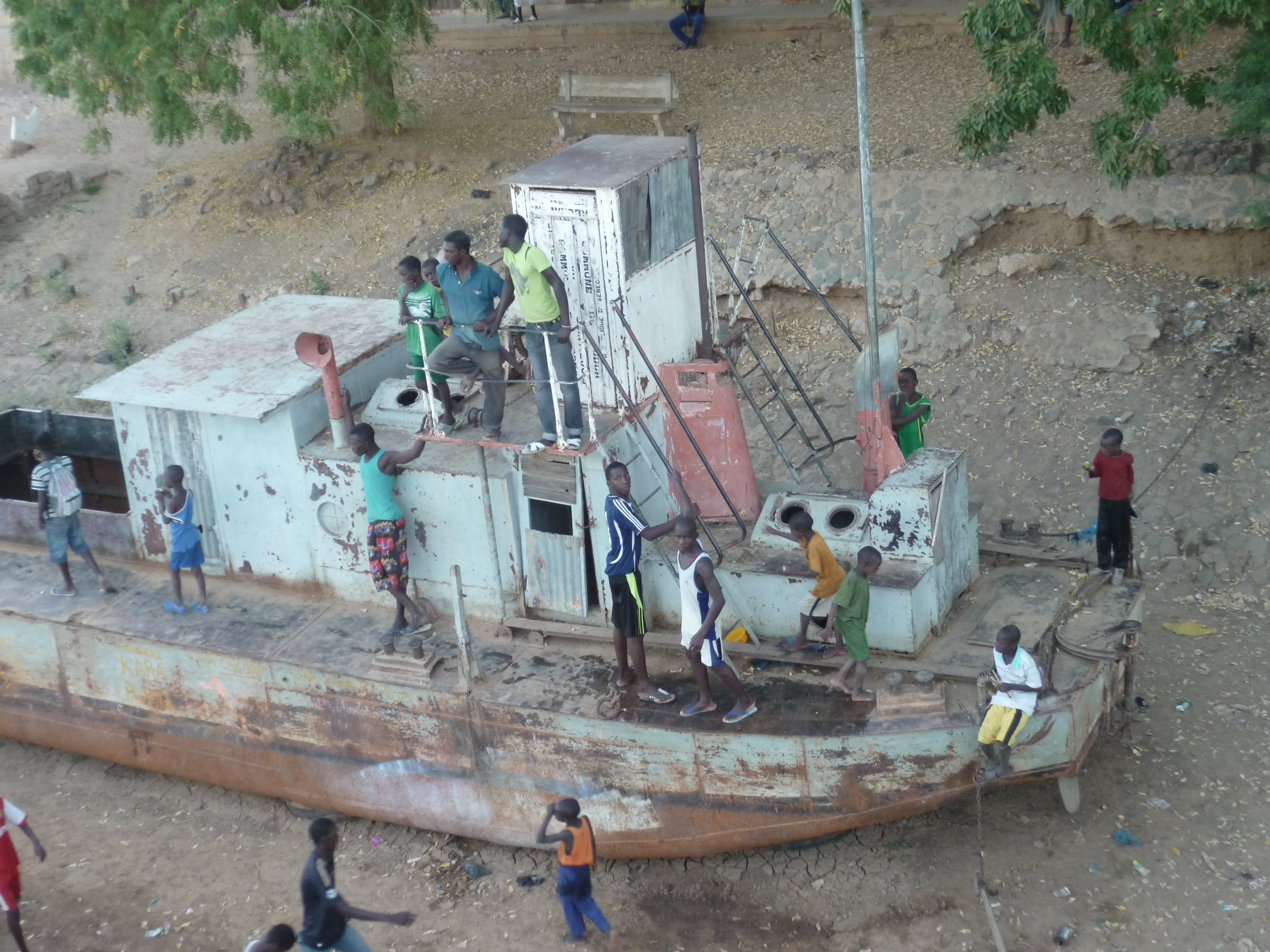
A rafiot in Senegal being used as a play ground by local kids

A rafiot is a fishing vessel, traditionally from the Mediterranean coast of France, and in particular Toulon.

In French, the term has come to pejoratively describe a vessel in poor shape.
