= Vauvenargues =

Vauvenargues may refer to:

== People ==
- Luc de Clapiers, marquis de Vauvenargues (1715–1747), French writer

== Places ==
- Château of Vauvenargues, the family home of Luc de Clapiers, in the village of Vauvenargues
- Vauvenargues, Bouches-du-Rhône, a commune in southern France
