= Cause (river) =

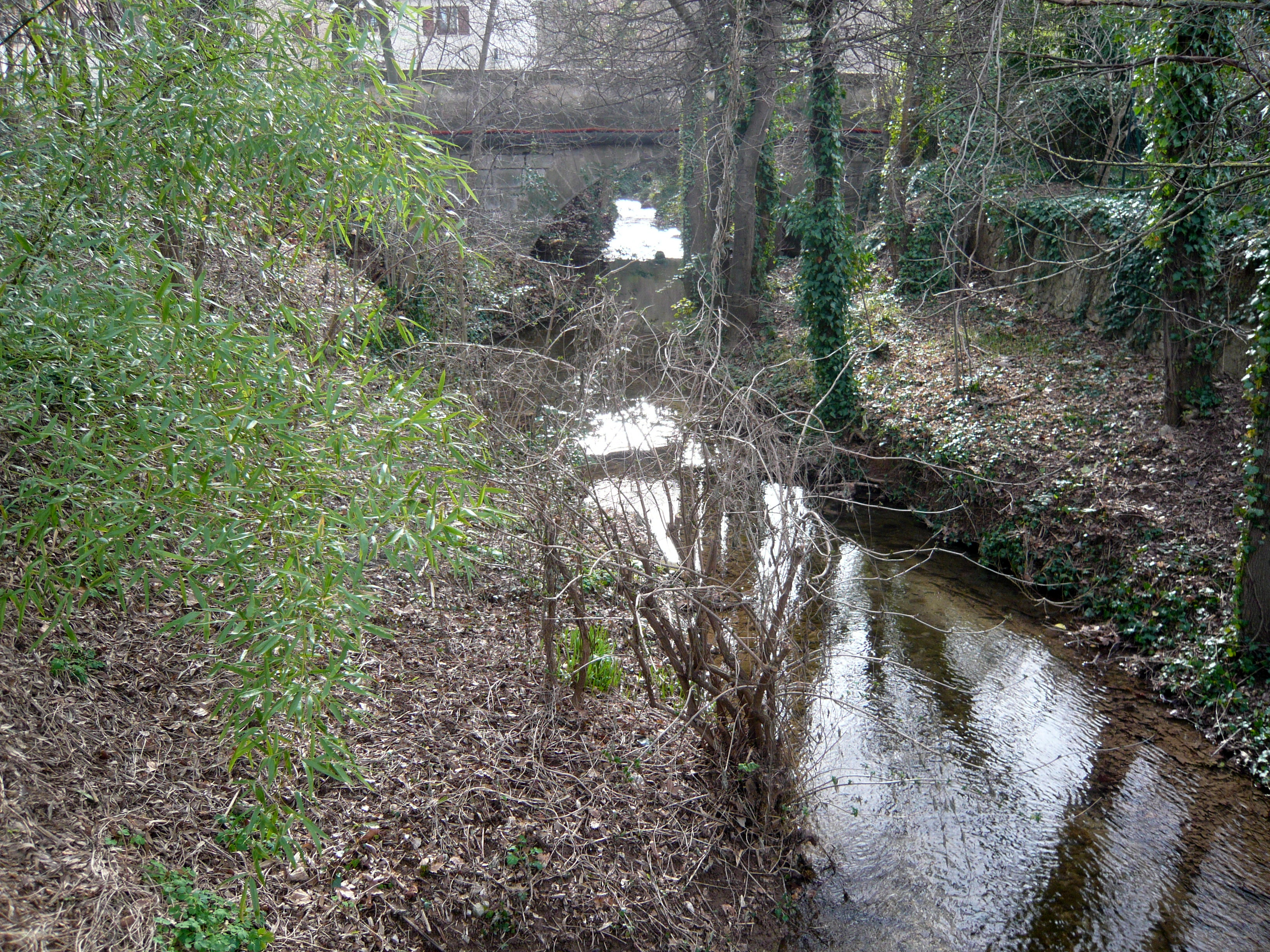
- The Cause in Le Tholonet

- Location within France Location within Provence-Alpes-Côte d'Azur

Location
- Country: France

Physical characteristics
- Mouth: Arc
  - coordinates: 43°30′26″N 5°29′27″E
- Length: 20.8 km (12.9 mi)

Basin features
- Progression: Arc→ Étang de Berre→ Mediterranean Sea

The Cause is a river in the Bouches-du-Rhône, France. It flows from its source in Vauvenargues to the river Arc near Palette. Recreational fishing is forbidden on Fridays except for bank holidays. It is 20.8 km (12.9 mi) long.
