= Saint-Marc-Jaumegarde =

Commune in Provence-Alpes-Côte d'Azur, France

- Commune
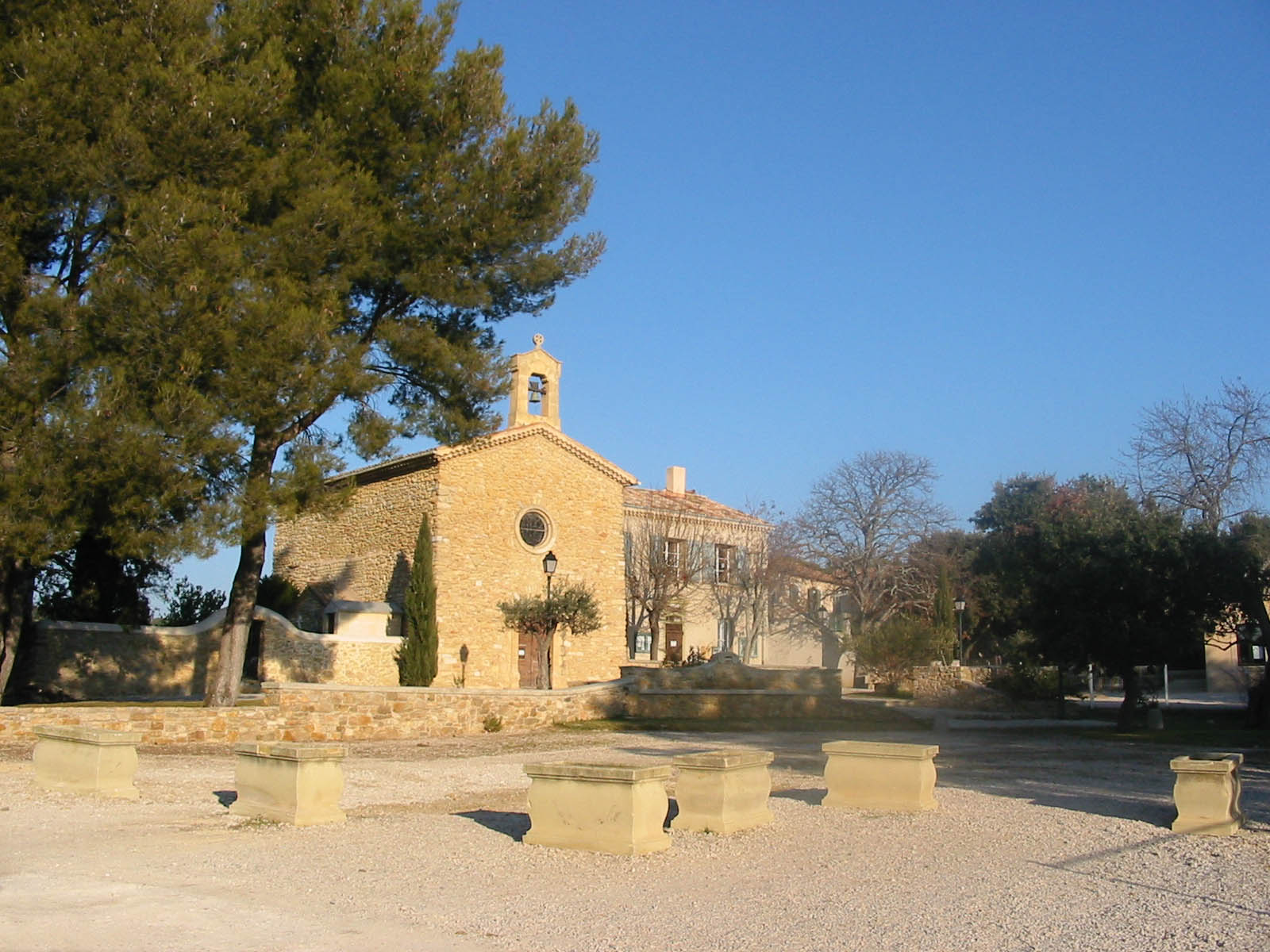
- The centre of the village of Saint-Marc

- Coat of arms
- Location of Saint-Marc-Jaumegarde
- Location within France Location within Provence-Alpes-Côte d'Azur
- Coordinates: 43°32′55″N 5°31′29″E
- Country: France
- Region: Provence-Alpes-Côte d'Azur
- Department: Bouches-du-Rhône
- Arrondissement: Aix-en-Provence
- Canton: Trets
- Intercommunality: Aix-Marseille-Provence

Government
  - Mayor (2026–32): Patrick Markarian
- Area^{1}: 22.56 km^{2} (8.71 sq mi)
- Elevation: 395 m (1,296 ft)
- Highest elevation: 600 m (2,000 ft)
- Lowest elevation: 241 m (791 ft)
- Population (2023): 1,273
  - Density: 56.43/km^{2} (146.1/sq mi)
- Time zone: UTC+01:00 (CET)
  - Summer (DST): UTC+02:00 (CEST)
- INSEE/Postal code: 13095 /13100
- Website: www.saint-marc-jaumegarde.fr
- ^{1} French Land Register data, which excludes lakes, ponds, glaciers > 1 km^{2} (0.386 sq mi or 247 acres) and river estuaries.

Saint-Marc-Jaumegarde (French pronunciation: [sɛ̃ maʁk ʒomgaʁd]; Provençal: Sant Marc de Jaumegarda) is a commune in the Bouches-du-Rhône department in southern France.

== Location ==
It is located 6 kilometres away from Aix-en-Provence and Vauvenargues, Bouches-du-Rhône, and 3 kilometres away from Le Tholonet, near the Montagne Sainte-Victoire.

The commune includes Bonfillons, Roussillier, Plan de l'Orgue, Savoyards, and Bourg.

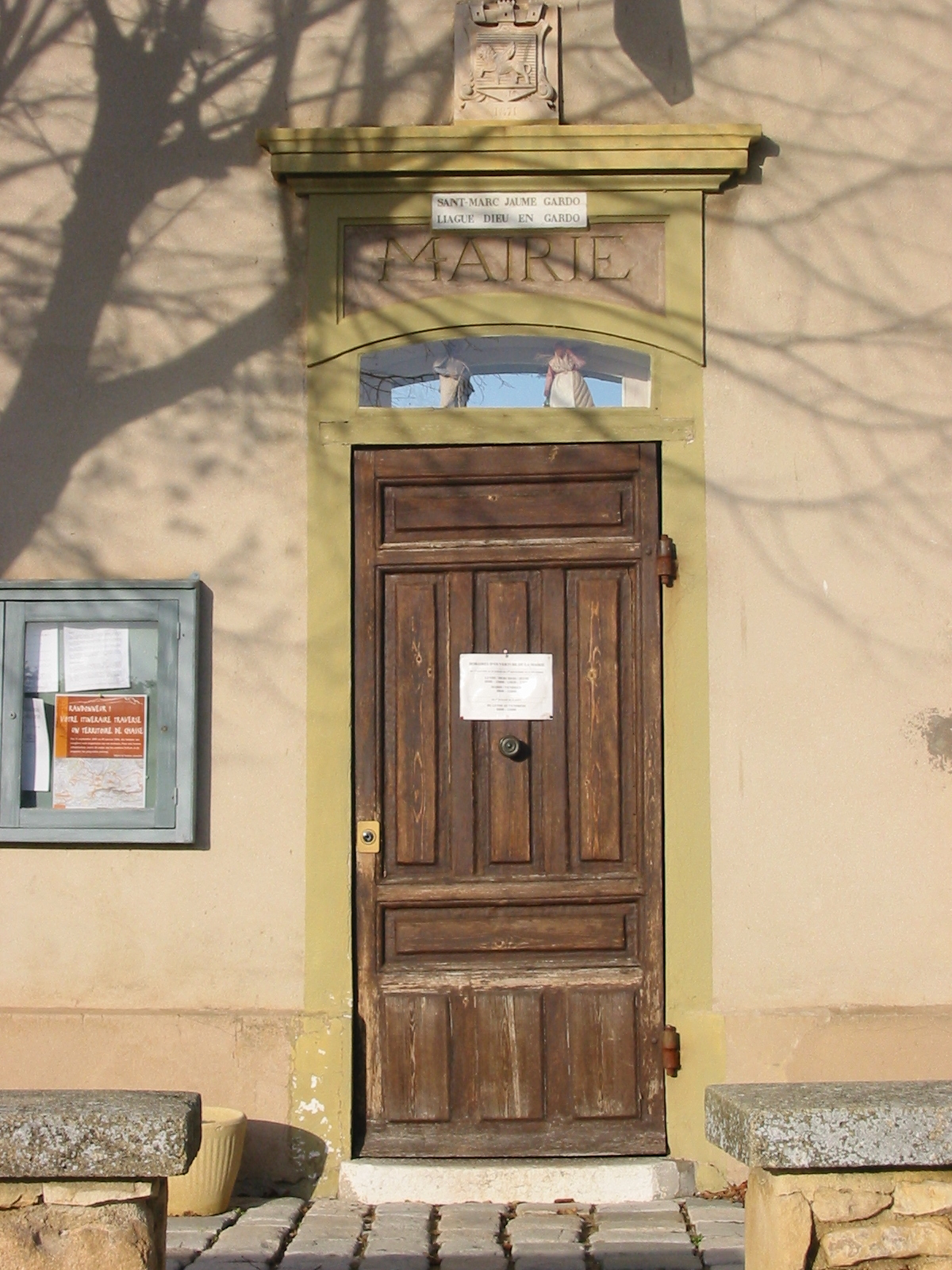
Town hall

There are two man-made lakes, namely Bimont and Zola, and the streamlet, Prignon.

== History ==
In 1239, the land was given to the Lord of Esparon by Ramon Berenguer IV, Count of Provence.

By 1490, Jacques Garde had become Lord of Saint-Marc, and twenty years later the land was passed on to Dauphine Garde, wife of Bertrand de Puget.

In 1723, Saint-Marc was sold to the Meyronnets, a family of advisors in the Provence Parliament. In 1784-1785 Philippe de Meyronnet invited Lucien Bonaparte and Joseph Bonaparte to his estate.

== Population ==
Historical population
Year	Pop.	±% p.a.
1968	356	—
1975	539	+6.10%
1982	517	−0.59%
1990	884	+6.94%
1999	1,078	+2.23%
2007	1,090	+0.14%
2012	1,125	+0.63%
2017	1,250	+2.13%
2023	1,273	+0.30%
Source: INSEE

== See also ==
- Communes of the Bouches-du-Rhône department
