= Torse (river) =

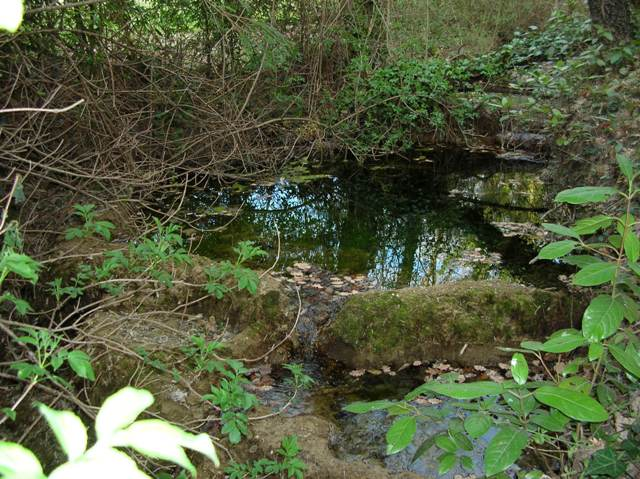
- The Prignon in Saint-Marc-Jaumegarde

- Location within France Location within Provence-Alpes-Côte d'Azur

Location
- Country: France

Physical characteristics
- Mouth: Arc
  - coordinates: 43°30′42″N 5°28′09″E
- Length: 8.0 km (5.0 mi)

Basin features
- Progression: Arc→ Étang de Berre→ Mediterranean Sea

The Torse (in its upper course also Ruisseau du Prignon) is a stream in the southeast of France. It runs from Saint-Marc-Jaumegarde to the Arc in Aix-en-Provence. It is 8 kilometres (5 mi) long.
