= Saint-Antonin-sur-Bayon =

Commune in Provence-Alpes-Côte d'Azur, France

- Commune
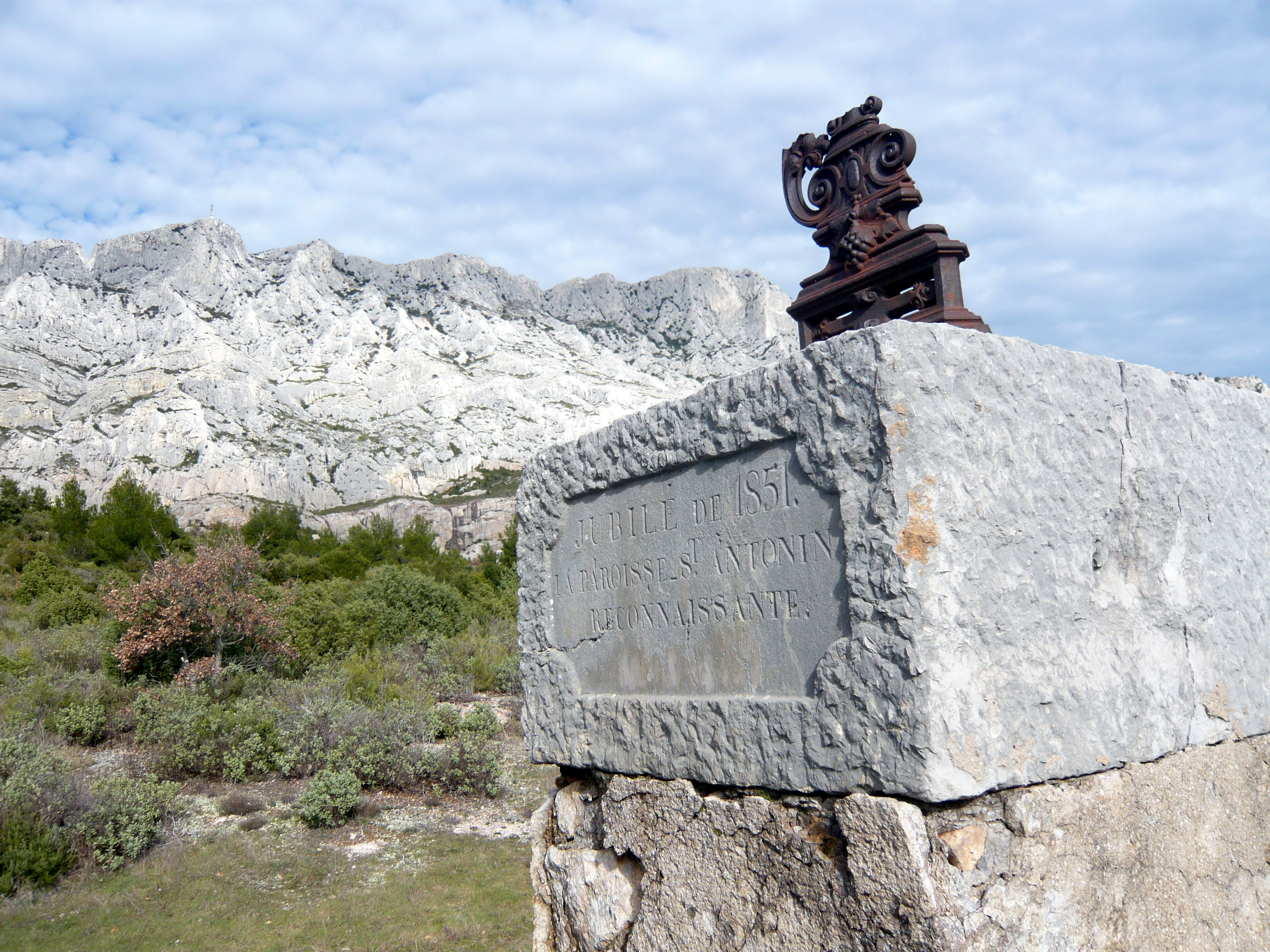
- A stone commemorating the "Jubilee of 1851. The grateful parish of St Antonin"

- Coat of arms
- Location of Saint-Antonin-sur-Bayon
- Location within France Location within Provence-Alpes-Côte d'Azur
- Coordinates: 43°31′08″N 5°35′00″E
- Country: France
- Region: Provence-Alpes-Côte d'Azur
- Department: Bouches-du-Rhône
- Arrondissement: Aix-en-Provence
- Canton: Trets
- Intercommunality: Aix-Marseille-Provence

Government
  - Mayor (2026–32): Christian Delavet
- Area^{1}: 17.57 km^{2} (6.78 sq mi)
- Elevation: 423 m (1,388 ft)
- Highest elevation: 1,015 m (3,330 ft)
- Lowest elevation: 277 m (909 ft)
- Population (2023): 126
  - Density: 7.17/km^{2} (18.6/sq mi)
- Time zone: UTC+01:00 (CET)
  - Summer (DST): UTC+02:00 (CEST)
- INSEE/Postal code: 13090 /13100
- ^{1} French Land Register data, which excludes lakes, ponds, glaciers > 1 km^{2} (0.386 sq mi or 247 acres) and river estuaries.

Saint-Antonin-sur-Bayon (Sant Antonin de Baion in Occitan) is a commune in the Bouches-du-Rhône department in southern France. The small stream Bayon runs through the village.

== Population ==
Historical population
Year	Pop.	±% p.a.
1968	55	—
1975	80	+5.50%
1982	150	+9.40%
1990	167	+1.35%
1999	165	−0.13%
2007	135	−2.48%
2012	130	−0.75%
2017	124	−0.94%
2023	126	+0.27%
Source: INSEE

== See also ==
- Communes of the Bouches-du-Rhône department
