= Meyreuil =

Commune in Provence-Alpes-Côte d'Azur, France

- Commune
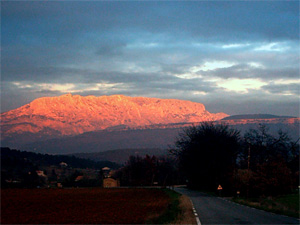
- Mont St. Victoire seen from Meyreuil

- Coat of arms
- Location of Meyreuil
- Location within France Location within Provence-Alpes-Côte d'Azur
- Coordinates: 43°29′13″N 5°29′42″E
- Country: France
- Region: Provence-Alpes-Côte d'Azur
- Department: Bouches-du-Rhône
- Arrondissement: Aix-en-Provence
- Canton: Trets
- Intercommunality: Aix-Marseille-Provence

Government
  - Mayor (2026–32): Jean-Pascal Gournes
- Area^{1}: 20.13 km^{2} (7.77 sq mi)
- Elevation: 262 m (860 ft)
- Highest elevation: 346 m (1,135 ft)
- Lowest elevation: 138 m (453 ft)
- Population (2023): 6,747
  - Density: 335.2/km^{2} (868.1/sq mi)
- Time zone: UTC+01:00 (CET)
  - Summer (DST): UTC+02:00 (CEST)
- INSEE/Postal code: 13060 /13590
- ^{1} French Land Register data, which excludes lakes, ponds, glaciers > 1 km^{2} (0.386 sq mi or 247 acres) and river estuaries.

Meyreuil (French pronunciation: [meʁœj]; Occitan: Mairuelh) is a commune in the Bouches-du-Rhône department in southern France, about 11 km (6.8 mi) from Aix en Provence.

== Geography ==
Located 11 km (6.8 mi) from Aix-en-Provence, the commune of Meyreuil is sheltered in the northeast by the mountain Montagne Sainte-Victoire, and the district of Canet is separated from the chief town by the river Arc.

Meyreuil is composed of three principal districts:

Meyreuil village includes the town hall, the church and the cemetery.

The Plan of Meyreuil, where the majority of the trade, the post office or the media library are located, is the economic center of the commune.

Canet, situated on RN7 (the road between Paris and Nice) has always been a transportation hub. Formerly the location of two stagecoach stops, Canet today includes many hotels and restaurants, as well as a technology park.

== History ==
The name of Meyreuil comes from that of the Roman General Marius, who fought a battle against the Ambrones and the Teutons near Aix in 102 B.C.

The village was successively called MIROIL (1098), MAIROL or MAIROIL in 1154, MEROLIO in 1259, MAREUIL to the 13th, 14th, 15th centuries, MAROLIUM and MEROLIUM in 1529, MERUEIL in 1634, MEIRUEILH in 1663, MEYRUEIL in 1766. The current name of Meyreuil is at most 200 years old.

In the 15th century, it belonged to Guillaume de Littera (1371-1452).

=== La Belle du Canet ===
A memorable figure in the history of Canet, la Belle du Canet was Lucrèce de Forbin-Solliès, widow of Henri de Rascas, lord of Canet and first Consul of Aix. She became the mistress of the Duke Louis de Vendôme, himself a widower. His deceased wife was Laure Mancini, niece of the Jules Cardinal Mazarin. Louis XIV, under pretext that they were both widowed (and, undoubtedly, for other more political reasons), opposed their marriage and had the Duke named as a Cardinal. This did not prevent the two lovers from being together. The Duke of Vendôme who lived in Aix-en-Provence at Cours Mirabeau, had a country house built, the Pavillon Vendôme, to meet his beloved who took care to disguise herself. The peasants of the suburb where the house was built called these disguised people the "machouettos". It is there that the Duke died Tuesday August 6, 1669, at only 57 years of age.

== Population ==
Historical population

Year	Pop.	±% p.a.
1793	793	—
1800	606	−3.77%
1806	770	+4.07%
1821	780	+0.09%
1831	914	+1.60%
1836	733	−4.32%
1841	754	+0.57%
1846	733	−0.56%
1851	750	+0.46%
1856	797	+1.22%
1861	769	−0.71%
1866	820	+1.29%
1872	767	−1.11%
1876	768	+0.03%
1881	684	−2.29%
1886	670	−0.41%
1891	681	+0.33%
1896	647	−1.02%
1901	636	−0.34%

Year	Pop.	±% p.a.
1906	638	+0.06%
1911	643	+0.16%
1921	628	−0.24%
1926	766	+4.05%
1931	1,034	+6.18%
1936	1,054	+0.38%
1946	1,149	+0.87%
1954	1,728	+5.23%
1962	2,042	+2.11%
1968	2,441	+3.02%
1975	2,492	+0.30%
1982	2,845	+1.91%
1990	3,766	+3.57%
1999	4,407	+1.76%
2007	5,008	+1.61%
2012	5,293	+1.11%
2017	5,669	+1.38%
2023	6,747	+2.94%

Source: EHESS and INSEE (1968-2023)

== Administration ==
Laurent Chazal, the mayor of the commune for 34 years, died on May 29, 2005. Robert Lagier succeeded Chazal as a result of the elections of July 3 and July 10, 2005. In March 2020, Jean-Pascal Gournes was elected mayor.

List of successive mayors
Term	Name
1950–1971	Virgile Arene
1971–2005	Laurent Chazal
2005–2020	Robert Lagier
2020–incumbent	Jean-Pascal Gournes

== See also ==
- Palette AOC
- Communes of the Bouches-du-Rhône department
