= Fuveau =

Commune in Provence-Alpes-Côte d'Azur, France

- Commune
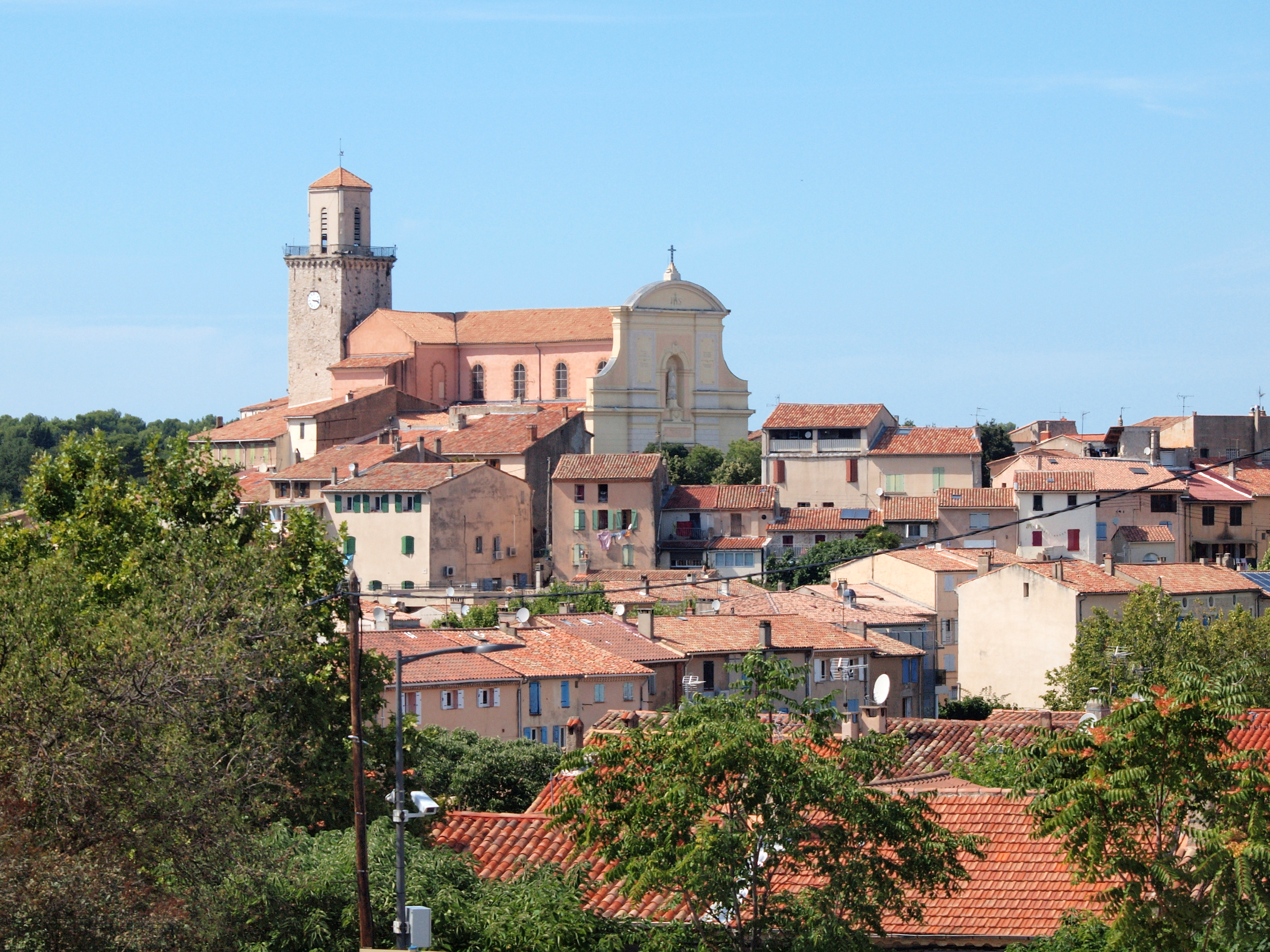
- The church of St. Michel

- Coat of arms
- Location of Fuveau
- Location within France Location within Provence-Alpes-Côte d'Azur
- Coordinates: 43°27′10″N 5°33′43″E
- Country: France
- Region: Provence-Alpes-Côte d'Azur
- Department: Bouches-du-Rhône
- Arrondissement: Aix-en-Provence
- Canton: Trets
- Intercommunality: Aix-Marseille-Provence

Government
  - Mayor (2026–32): Béatrice Bonfillon Chiavassa
- Area^{1}: 30.02 km^{2} (11.59 sq mi)
- Elevation: 220 m (720 ft)
- Highest elevation: 381 m (1,250 ft)
- Lowest elevation: 179 m (587 ft)
- Population (2023): 10,337
  - Density: 344.3/km^{2} (891.8/sq mi)
- Time zone: UTC+01:00 (CET)
  - Summer (DST): UTC+02:00 (CEST)
- INSEE/Postal code: 13040 /13710
- ^{1} French Land Register data, which excludes lakes, ponds, glaciers > 1 km^{2} (0.386 sq mi or 247 acres) and river estuaries.

Fuveau (French pronunciation: [fyvo]; Occitan: Fuvèu) is a commune in the Bouches-du-Rhône department in southern France.

== Population ==
Historical population

Year	Pop.	±% p.a.
1793	1,187	—
1800	1,528	+3.67%
1806	1,271	−3.02%
1821	1,499	+1.11%
1831	2,004	+2.95%
1836	2,014	+0.10%
1841	2,100	+0.84%
1846	2,450	+3.13%
1851	2,718	+2.10%
1856	2,706	−0.09%
1861	2,883	+1.28%
1866	2,856	−0.19%
1872	2,754	−0.60%
1876	3,069	+2.74%
1881	2,684	−2.65%
1886	2,593	−0.69%
1891	2,482	−0.87%
1896	2,190	−2.47%
1901	2,184	−0.05%

Year	Pop.	±% p.a.
1906	2,357	+1.54%
1911	2,300	−0.49%
1921	2,065	−1.07%
1926	2,197	+1.25%
1931	2,272	+0.67%
1936	2,072	−1.83%
1946	2,139	+0.32%
1954	2,448	+1.70%
1962	2,528	+0.40%
1968	3,028	+3.05%
1975	3,348	+1.45%
1982	4,029	+2.68%
1990	6,410	+5.98%
1999	7,507	+1.77%
2007	8,683	+1.84%
2012	9,369	+1.53%
2017	10,157	+1.63%
2023	10,337	+0.29%

Source: EHESS and INSEE (1968-2023)

== See also ==
- Communes of the Bouches-du-Rhône department
