= Venelles =

Commune in Provence-Alpes-Côte d'Azur, France

- Commune
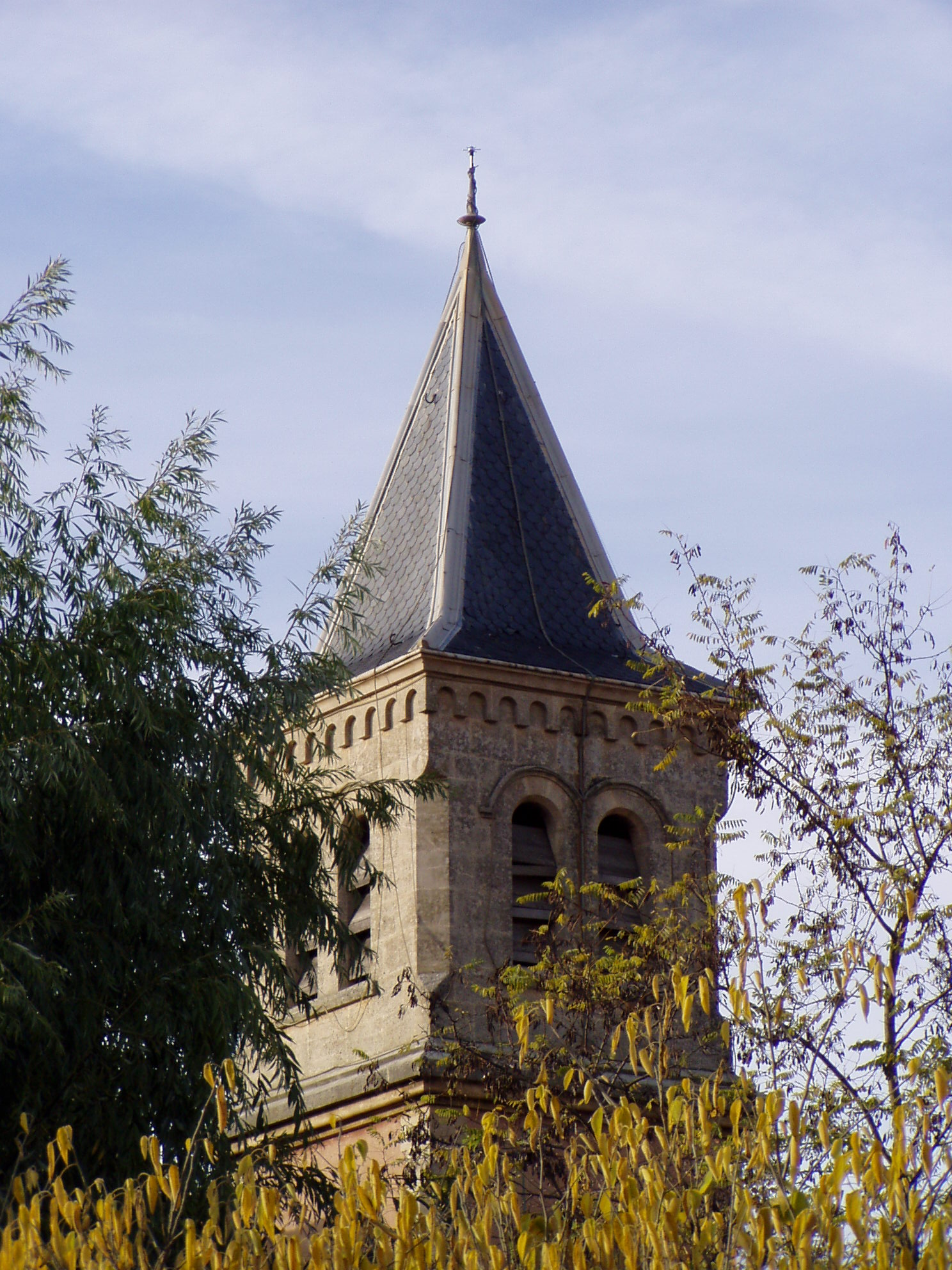
- The bell tower of the church of Venelles

- Coat of arms
- Location of Venelles
- Location within France Location within Provence-Alpes-Côte d'Azur
- Coordinates: 43°35′57″N 5°29′00″E
- Country: France
- Region: Provence-Alpes-Côte d'Azur
- Department: Bouches-du-Rhône
- Arrondissement: Aix-en-Provence
- Canton: Trets
- Intercommunality: Aix-Marseille-Provence

Government
  - Mayor (2026–32): Arnaud Mercier
- Area^{1}: 20.54 km^{2} (7.93 sq mi)
- Elevation: 409 m (1,342 ft)
- Highest elevation: 442 m (1,450 ft)
- Lowest elevation: 254 m (833 ft)
- Population (2023): 8,418
  - Density: 409.8/km^{2} (1,061/sq mi)
- Time zone: UTC+01:00 (CET)
  - Summer (DST): UTC+02:00 (CEST)
- INSEE/Postal code: 13113 /13770
- ^{1} French Land Register data, which excludes lakes, ponds, glaciers > 1 km^{2} (0.386 sq mi or 247 acres) and river estuaries.

Venelles (French pronunciation: [vənɛl]; Occitan: Venèla) is a commune in the Bouches-du-Rhône department in southern France near Aix-en-Provence. The current mayor is Arnaud Mercier.

== History ==
In 15 BC, there was a Roman settlement there. It was then destroyed by the Lombards in 574 AD, and again in the 11th century by the Saracens.

In the 15th century, the land was finally re-settled.

In 1530 there were seven houses, by 1728 there were 30, in 1765 there were 124 and in 1820 there were 211.

In 1865 a railway was built, followed by a school in 1882.

On 11 June 1909, an earthquake destroyed many houses.

== Population ==
Historical population

Year	Pop.	±% p.a.
1793	796	—
1800	722	−1.38%
1806	800	+1.72%
1821	833	+0.27%
1831	828	−0.06%
1836	740	−2.22%
1841	716	−0.66%
1846	659	−1.65%
1851	753	+2.70%
1856	698	−1.51%
1861	740	+1.18%
1866	709	−0.85%
1872	680	−0.69%
1876	676	−0.15%
1881	612	−1.97%
1886	600	−0.40%
1891	538	−2.16%
1896	539	+0.04%
1901	519	−0.75%

Year	Pop.	±% p.a.
1906	506	−0.51%
1911	511	+0.20%
1921	467	−0.90%
1926	514	+1.94%
1931	512	−0.08%
1936	447	−2.68%
1946	452	+0.11%
1954	531	+2.03%
1962	623	+2.02%
1968	1,553	+16.44%
1975	2,672	+8.06%
1982	5,225	+10.05%
1990	7,046	+3.81%
1999	7,535	+0.75%
2007	8,110	+0.92%
2012	8,278	+0.41%
2017	8,383	+0.25%
2023	8,418	+0.07%

Source: EHESS and INSEE (1968-2023)

== See also ==
- Communes of the Bouches-du-Rhône department
