= Canton of Trets =

Coordinates: 43.45°N 5.69°E

- Canton
- Situation of the canton of Trets in the department of Bouches-du-Rhône
- Country: France
- Region: Provence-Alpes-Côte d'Azur
- Department: Bouches-du-Rhône
- No. of communes: {{{nbcomm}}}
- Population (2023): 75,812
- INSEE code: 1328

The canton of Trets is an administrative division of the Bouches-du-Rhône department, in southeastern France. At the French canton reorganisation which came into effect in March 2015, it was expanded from 7 to 18 communes. Its seat is in Trets.

It consists of the following communes:

1. Beaurecueil
2. Châteauneuf-le-Rouge
3. Fuveau
4. Jouques
5. Meyrargues
6. Meyreuil
7. Peynier
8. Peyrolles-en-Provence
9. Puyloubier
10. Le Puy-Sainte-Réparade
11. Rousset
12. Saint-Antonin-sur-Bayon
13. Saint-Marc-Jaumegarde
14. Saint-Paul-lès-Durance
15. Le Tholonet
16. Trets
17. Vauvenargues
18. Venelles
