= Rousset, Bouches-du-Rhône =

Commune in Provence-Alpes-Côte d'Azur, France

Rousset
- Commune
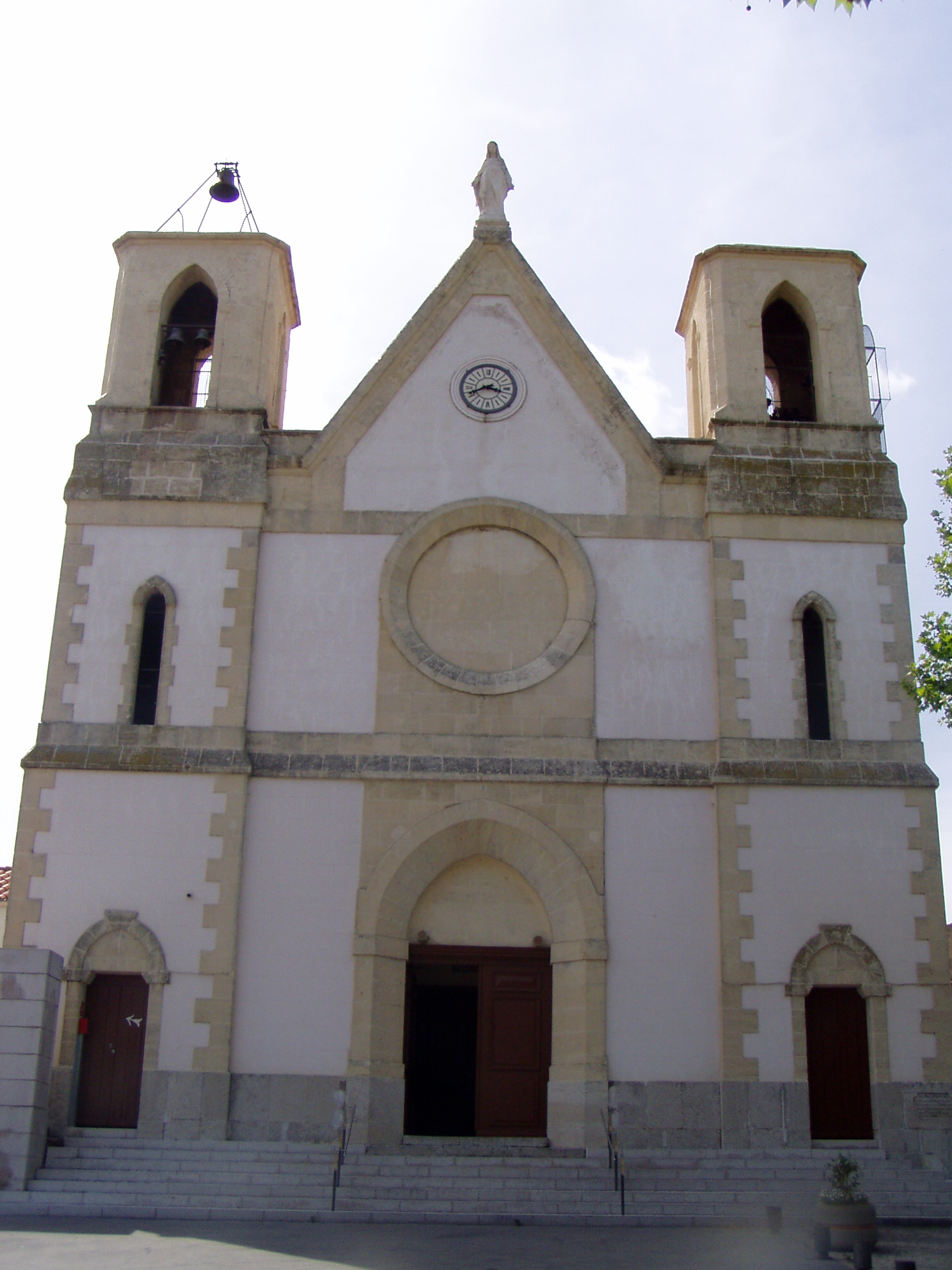
- The church of Rousset

- Coat of arms
- Location of Rousset
- Location within France Location within Provence-Alpes-Côte d'Azur
- Coordinates: 43°28′52″N 5°37′19″E
- Country: France
- Region: Provence-Alpes-Côte d'Azur
- Department: Bouches-du-Rhône
- Arrondissement: Aix-en-Provence
- Canton: Trets
- Intercommunality: Aix-Marseille-Provence

Government
  - Mayor (2026–32): Philippe Pignon
- Area^{1}: 19.50 km^{2} (7.53 sq mi)
- Elevation: 224 m (735 ft)
- Highest elevation: 480 m (1,570 ft)
- Lowest elevation: 196 m (643 ft)
- Population (2023): 5,425
  - Density: 278.2/km^{2} (720.5/sq mi)
- Time zone: UTC+01:00 (CET)
  - Summer (DST): UTC+02:00 (CEST)
- INSEE/Postal code: 13087 /13790
- ^{1} French Land Register data, which excludes lakes, ponds, glaciers > 1 km^{2} (0.386 sq mi or 247 acres) and river estuaries.

Rousset (French pronunciation: [ʁusɛ]; Occitan: Rosset) is a commune in the Bouches-du-Rhône department in southern France close to Aix-en-Provence.

== History ==
Although Rousset can be traced back to the Romans, the first written mention comes in a 1050 document, under the name of "Rosselun" or "roscetum rosetum". In the Middle Ages, a castle as well as a church and chapels were built, as dwellings increased.

In the 9th century, Rousset belonged to the Abbey of Saint-Victor, then by 1143 the Knights Templar took over, followed by the Knights of Malta in 1307. In the 15th century, it belonged to Guillaume de Littera (1371-1452).

Under the French Revolution, the castle was destroyed.

The church was built in 1861.

It is now home to a semiconductor fab and research center of STMicroelectronics and until 2014 also of another fab of LFoundry (originally set up by Atmel).

=== Cross of Provence ===
The fourth Croix de Provence on the Montagne Sainte-Victoire was erected in 1875, on the initiative of the parish priest of Rousset, Father Meissonnier, to ward off two evils: smallpox and the aftermath of the Franco-Prussian War of 1870.

== Population ==
Historical population

Year	Pop.	±% p.a.
1793	436	—
1800	560	+3.64%
1806	573	+0.38%
1821	672	+1.07%
1831	874	+2.66%
1836	711	−4.04%
1841	827	+3.07%
1846	805	−0.54%
1851	808	+0.07%
1856	895	+2.07%
1861	981	+1.85%
1866	991	+0.20%
1872	1,109	+1.89%
1876	853	−6.35%
1881	777	−1.85%
1886	730	−1.24%
1891	693	−1.03%
1896	684	−0.26%
1901	668	−0.47%

Year	Pop.	±% p.a.
1906	683	+0.45%
1911	713	+0.86%
1921	862	+1.92%
1926	705	−3.94%
1931	721	+0.45%
1936	701	−0.56%
1946	763	+0.85%
1954	736	−0.45%
1962	845	+1.74%
1968	1,191	+5.89%
1975	1,559	+3.92%
1982	2,078	+4.19%
1990	2,942	+4.44%
1999	3,617	+2.32%
2007	4,186	+1.84%
2012	4,561	+1.73%
2017	4,844	+1.21%
2023	5,425	+1.91%

Source: EHESS and INSEE (1968-2023)

== Twin towns ==
- Rousset is twinned with Kirkop in Malta.

== See also ==
- Communes of the Bouches-du-Rhône department
