= Guillaume de Littera =

- Born: 1371
- Died: 1452 (aged 80–81)
- Occupations: Canon, provost, vicar, landowner
- Parent(s): Nicolas Vulpure de Littera; Sancie de Roviera

Guillaume de Littera (1371–1452) was a French Roman Catholic canon and provost in Aix-en-Provence as well as vicar in a diocese encompassing several localities in Provence. He became a large landowner after he inherited Meyreuil and Rousset.

== Early life ==
Guillaume de Littera was born circa 1371. He grew up in a wealthy aristocratic family. His father, Nicolas Vulpure de Littera (1333-1396), who received significant wealth from his first wife, Jacoba, was a notary. His mother, Sancie de Roviera, was an heiress of Meyreuil. His parents had nine children.

He received a Doctorate in Law.

== Career ==
He became a Roman Catholic canon and later provost in Aix-en-Provence. In 1423, he donated his collection of books to the Cathedral of Aix-en-Provence.

In the 1420s, he had an argument with the Archdeacon of Avignon, and threatened to excommunicate him. As it were, the Archdeacon of Avignon excommunicated him. However, on January 26, 1429, his excommunication was overruled.

He was also an advisor to the King. In 1426, after the death of the Countess of Avellin, Alix des Baux (1367-1426), he received the Baronetcy of Aubagne from Prince Charles, the brother of the Count of Provence, Louis III. He also inherited Meyreuil from his mother and Rousset from an aunt.

He served as Vicar under Antipope Felix V in the Diocese of Nice, Vence, Glandevès, Senez and Vintimille. After his death, his service was discontinued. However, Pope Nicholas V forgave him in 1447, and he was Vicar in the diocese again by 1451.

== Death ==
He died in 1452. His three nieces inherited Meyreuil. His illegitimate son, sometimes referred to as a nephew, inherited Rousset; however, his family members soon disinherited him.
