= Bayeux (river) =

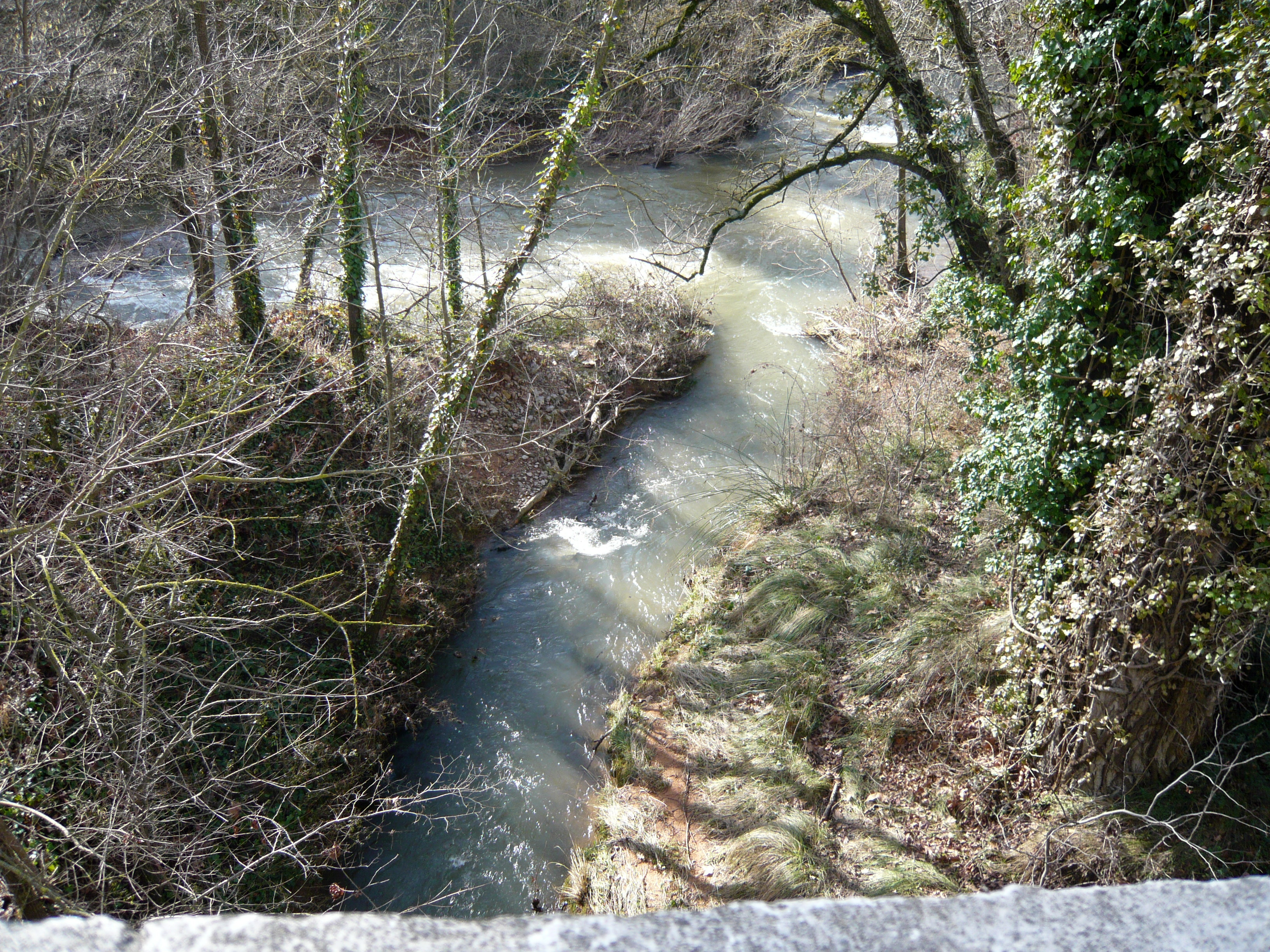

- Location within France Location within Provence-Alpes-Côte d'Azur

Location
- Country: France

Physical characteristics
- Mouth: Arc
  - coordinates: 43°30′3″N 5°30′59″E
- Length: 10 km (6.2 mi)

Basin features
- Progression: Arc→ Étang de Berre→ Mediterranean Sea

The Bayeux (French pronunciation: [bajø]; Occitan: Baion) is a short stream in the southeast of France. In the upper 2 kilometres (1.2 mi) of its course it is called Bayon. It runs from the Montagne Sainte-Victoire to the Arc, near Meyreuil. It is 10 km (6.2 mi) long.
