= Tomette =

Type of terracotta tile

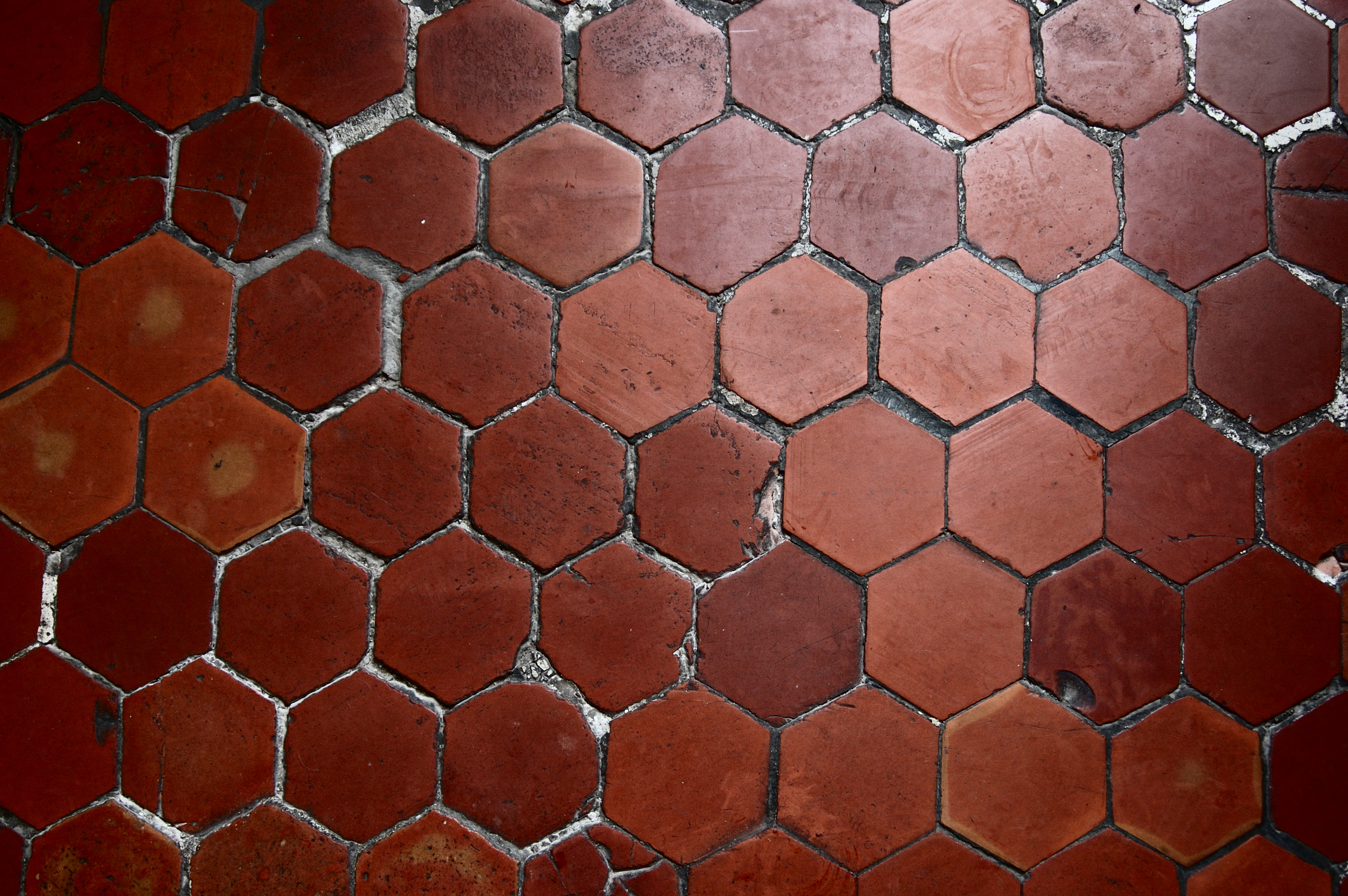
Tomettes in the town hall of Aix-en-Provence

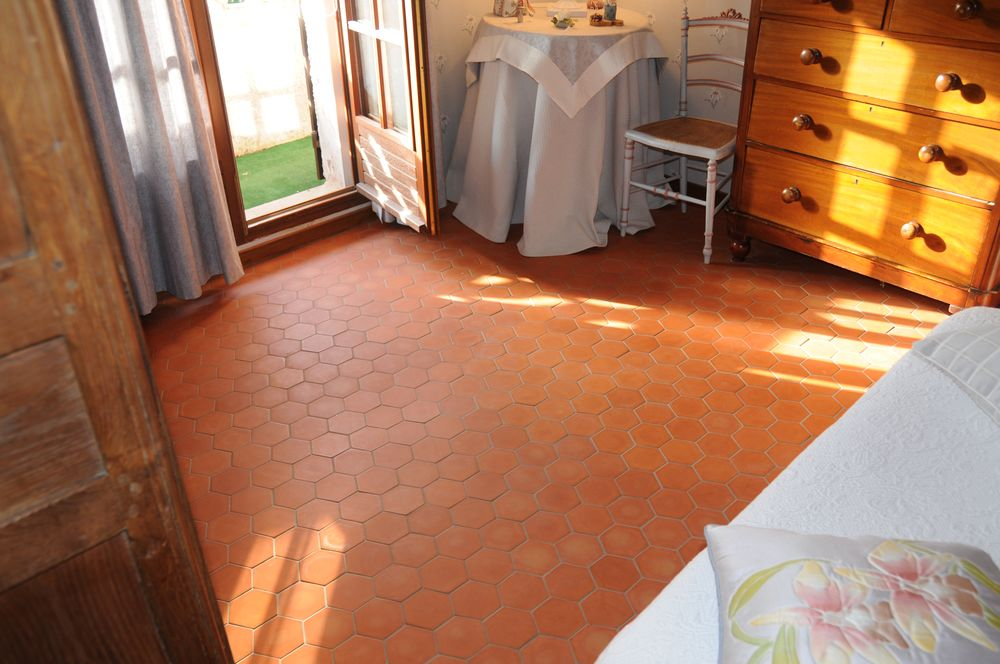
Tomettes in a residential building in Salernes

Tomettes are a type of terracotta tile that is commonly used as flooring, particularly in southern regions of France including Provence, Dauphiné and the island of Corsica, but also elsewhere including Paris. They are typically hexagonal (or sometimes octagonal) in shape, which allows them to tessellate into a uniform surface while minimizing the need for a seal substance.

== History ==
Terracotta tiles were historically valued for their ability to retain heat from a hearth, and for keeping rooms cool in the summer. The tomette was developed in response to an economic crisis in 1829 which saw a fall in purchasing power as a result of industrialisation. Their shape made it possible to maximize the use of clay by minimizing losses when cutting the tiles, and reduces the amount of sealer material required between them. Production was centred in Apt and Salernes, where the ferruginous clay soil was ideal for the production of the tiles. By the 1850s production had greatly expanded and the tiles were being supplied to merchants in Toulon, Marseille and Nice, but were also being exported abroad to parts of Africa, Italy and the United States. Tomettes were later used in the reconstruction of homes after the Second World War but fell out of fashion after the mid 20th century, although they have recently seen a revival as their properties adapt well to modern underfloor heating.

== See also ==
- Saltillo tile, a type of terracotta tile from Mexico
- Azulejos, painted ceramic tiles popular in Portugal and Spain
