= Luc de Clapiers, marquis de Vauvenargues =

French writer, nobleman and moralist (1715–1747)

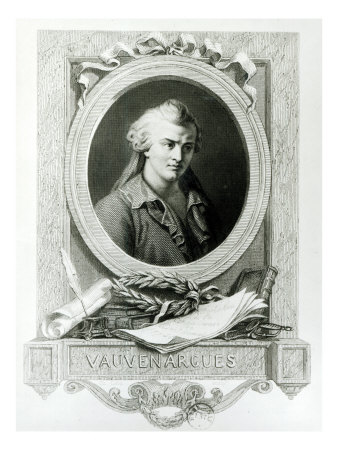
Luc de Clapiers, marquis de Vauvenargues

Luc de Clapiers, marquis de Vauvenargues (French: [vovnaʁɡ]; 6 August 1715 – 28 May 1747) was a French writer and moralist. He died at age 31, in broken health, having published the year prior—anonymously—a collection of essays and aphorisms with the encouragement of Voltaire, his friend (20 years his senior). He first received public notice under his own name in 1797, and from 1857 on, his aphorisms became popular.

== Life ==
He was born in Aix-en-Provence, Province of Provence, into the nobility, but his family was poor. He spent his youth at the family seat, Chateau of Vauvenargues. Frail health prevented him from pursuing any but minimal schooling; he did not study Latin or Greek. He also suffered poor eyesight. In boyhood, he became friends with Victor Riqueti, marquis of Mirabeau (born 1715), father of the future French Revolution figure, Mirabeau, and with the future archaeologist, Jules-François-Paul Fauris de Saint-Vincens (born 1718), with both of whom he would correspond avidly once he left home. In his adolescence he was greatly fond of Plutarch and Seneca, and represents in a letter to the marquis de Mirabeau a memory of being so filled with energy on reading the letters of Brutus to Cicero that he had to run at full speed outside until exhaustion.

In the France of that age, the only occupations considered proper for a nobleman were in the military or the church. At age 17 or 18, Vauvenargues embarked on a career in the military, as a cadet in the King's Regiment. By 1739, he had achieved the rank of lieutenant; later, he was promoted to captain. In 1740, he met a fellow officer, an adolescent about nine years his junior, Paul Hippolyte Emmanuel de Seytres, who became a permanent object of the author's devotion. The two were part of the disastrous Siege of Prague (1742), the expedition to Bohemia in support of Frederick the Great's designs on Silesia, in which the French were abandoned by their ally. Seytres died in the spring, at the age of seventeen. The future author's fascination for the boy persisted for the remaining five years of his own life. He addressed his philosophical work Conseil à un jeune homme (Advice to a young Man) to Seytres and labored on a funeral eulogy for him, a work which Vauvenargues considered to be among the most important of his life and which he continued to polish until his own death. The Siege of Prague ruined Vauvenargues physically. In December, when half the army was conducted in a strategic retreat, his legs froze, and though he spent a long time in hospital at Nancy he never completely recovered. He was present at the battle of Dettingen, and on his return to France was garrisoned at Arras. He retired from the army.

He began corresponding with Voltaire in April 1743. He was encouraged to turn to literature by his friend the marquis of Mirabeau, author of L'Ami des Hommes, and father of the statesman. Wishing to enter the diplomatic service, for two years he made applications to ministers and to King Louis XV himself. These efforts were unsuccessful, but Vauvenargues nevertheless came close to securing a diplomatic appointment, thanks to the intervention of Voltaire. But he contracted smallpox, which disfigured him, rendered him nearly blind, and left him with a chronic cough. Voltaire then asked him to submit to him his ideas on the difference between Jean Racine and Pierre Corneille. Their acquaintance ripened into a deep friendship.

Vauvenargues managed to move to Paris in 1745, where he lived as a recluse. Among the few people he socialized with were Jean-François Marmontel and Voltaire. He continued to correspond with Fauris de Saint-Vincens. In 1746 he published—anonymously—his sole volume, a collection of writing including Introduction à la connaissance de l'esprit humain, with Reflexions and Maximes appended. Voltaire implored him to publish a second edition of the book with improved diction. It was published in the year of his death (different sources disagree on whether he lived to see the publication of the second edition).

He died in Paris on 28 May 1747.

== Works ==
In childhood, he developed a great admiration for the work of the ancient Greek writer Plutarch.

Despite the scantiness of Vauvenargues's œuvre, it has attracted considerable interest. A century after his death, Schopenhauer favorably quoted several of Vauvenargues's sayings, including: "la clarté est la bonne foi des philosophes" [clarity is the good faith of philosophers], from Reflections and Maxims, 729, and: "personne n'est sujet a plus de fautes que ceux qui n'agissent que par reflexion" [none are so prone to make mistakes as those who act only on reflection].

The chief distinction between Vauvenargues and his predecessor François de La Rochefoucauld is that Vauvenargues thinks nobly of man, and is altogether inclined rather to the Stoic than to the Epicurean theory. He has been called a modern Stoic.
