= Arc (Provence) =

River in southern France

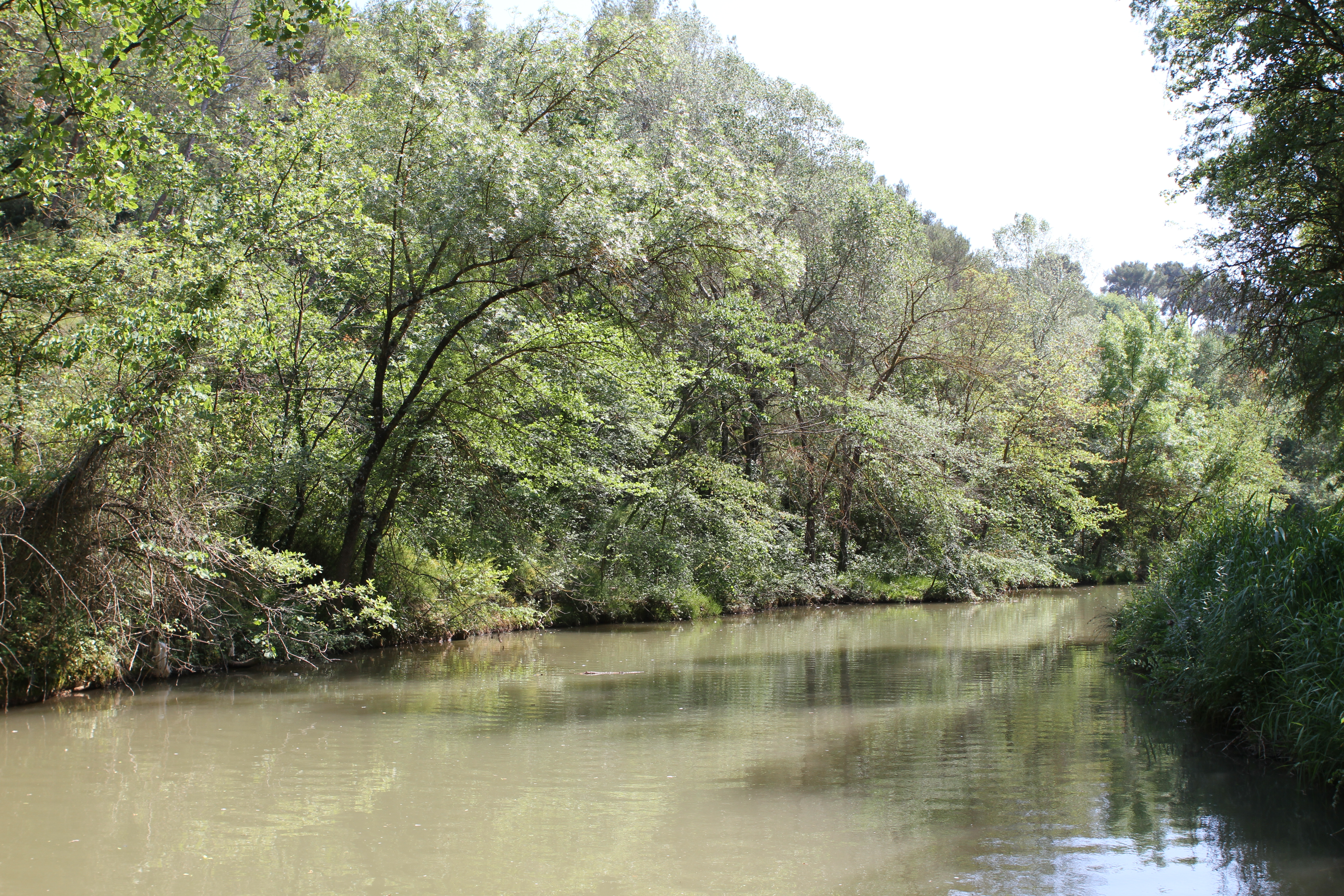
- The Arc flowing near Aix-en-Provence

- Location of mouth Arc (Provence) (Provence-Alpes-Côte d'Azur)

Location
- Country: France

Physical characteristics
- Source
  - location: Pourcieux
  - elevation: 470 m (1,540 ft)
- Mouth: Étang de Berre
  - coordinates: 43°30′24″N 5°6′49″E
- Length: 83 km (52 mi)
- Basin size: 716 km^{2} (276 mi^{2})

Basin features
- Progression: Étang de Berre→ Mediterranean Sea

The Arc (French pronunciation: [aʁk]) is an 83-kilometre (52 mi) long river in Southern France. It arises at an elevation of 470 metres (1,540 ft), close to the village of Pourcieux. It then passes through Aix-en-Provence before flowing into the Étang de Berre, a lagoon connected with the Mediterranean Sea to the west of Marseille. Its drainage basin, with a surface area of 716 square kilometres (276 mi^{2}), is divided between two departments, Var and Bouches-du-Rhône. The Bayeux, the Cause and the Torse are its tributaries.

The Roquefavour Aqueduct passes over the river; Paul Cézanne's Mont Sainte-Victoire and the Viaduct of the Arc River Valley is the best known piece of art representing the Arc.
