= Vauvenargues, Bouches-du-Rhône =

Commune in Provence-Alpes-Côte d'Azur, France

Vauvenargues
- Commune
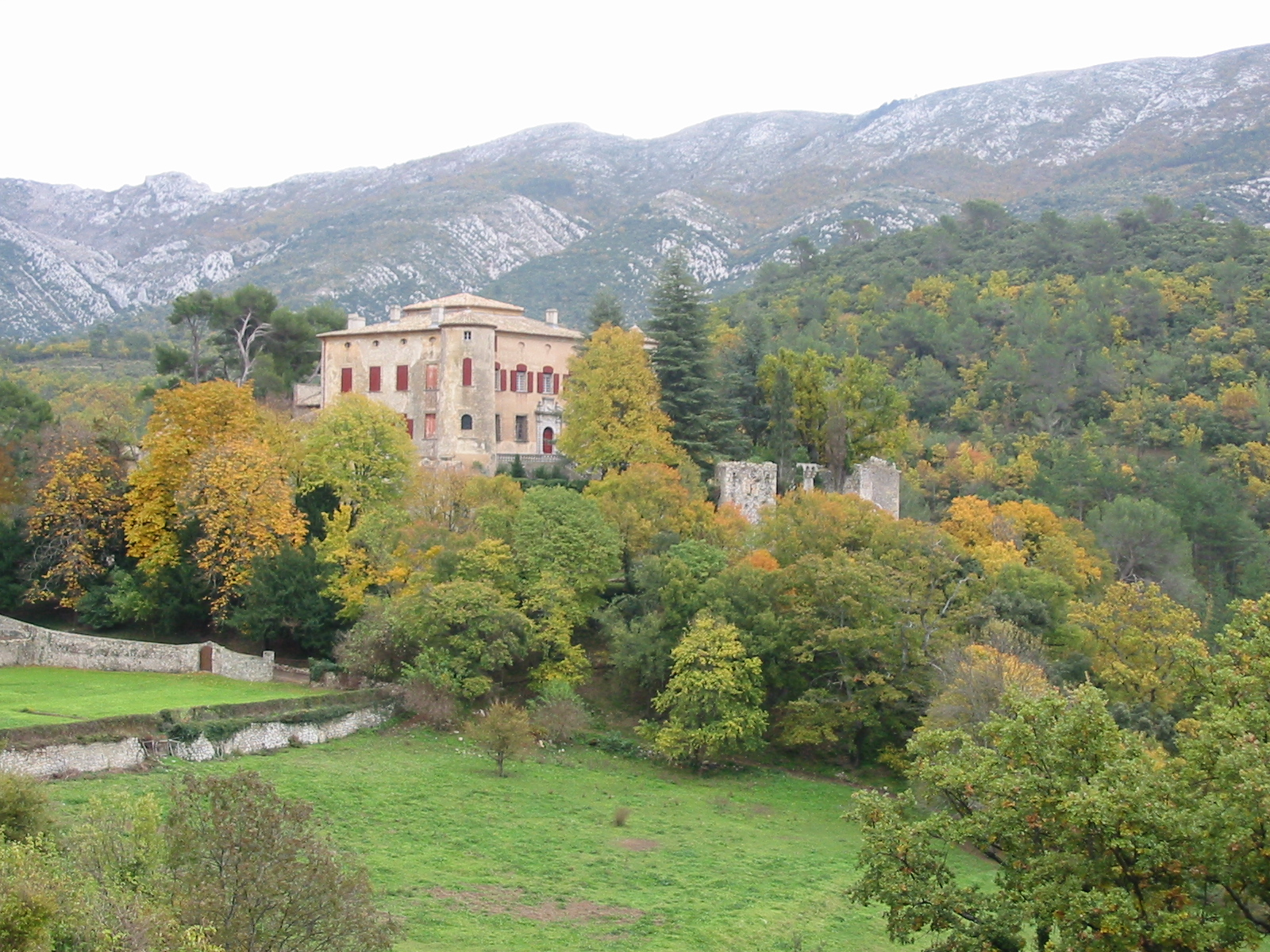
- Vauvenargues castle

- Coat of arms
- Location of Vauvenargues
- Location within France Location within Provence-Alpes-Côte d'Azur
- Coordinates: 43°33′20″N 5°36′13″E
- Country: France
- Region: Provence-Alpes-Côte d'Azur
- Department: Bouches-du-Rhône
- Arrondissement: Aix-en-Provence
- Canton: Trets
- Intercommunality: Aix-Marseille-Provence

Government
  - Mayor (2026–32): Philippe Charrin (UDI)
- Area^{1}: 54.31 km^{2} (20.97 sq mi)
- Elevation: 458 m (1,503 ft)
- Highest elevation: 1,016 m (3,333 ft)
- Lowest elevation: 346 m (1,135 ft)
- Population (2023): 1,058
  - Density: 19.48/km^{2} (50.45/sq mi)
- Time zone: UTC+01:00 (CET)
  - Summer (DST): UTC+02:00 (CEST)
- INSEE/Postal code: 13111 /13126
- ^{1} French Land Register data, which excludes lakes, ponds, glaciers > 1 km^{2} (0.386 sq mi or 247 acres) and river estuaries.

Vauvenargues (French pronunciation: [vovnaʁg]; Provençal: Vauvenarga) is a commune in the Bouches-du-Rhône department in southern France. It is close to Aix-en-Provence and the Montagne Sainte-Victoire.

== Population ==
Historical population
Year	Pop.	±% p.a.
1968	271	—
1975	412	+6.17%
1982	585	+5.14%
1990	674	+1.79%
1999	729	+0.88%
2007	909	+2.80%
2012	1,034	+2.61%
2017	1,013	−0.41%
2023	1,058	+0.73%
Source: INSEE

== Chateau of Vauvenargues ==
The chateau in Vauvenargues stands on the site of a Roman fort which eventually was incorporated in a medieval fortress controlled by the Counts of Provence and later the Archbishops of Aix. For 250 years until the French Revolution it was the seat of the de Clapiers family, who rebuilt the chateau in its present form and on whom Louis XV bestowed the title Marquis of Vauvernagues. For 150 years after that it was occupied by the d'Isoard family. In the mid-twentieth century its connection with French nobility lapsed. It was eventually bought in 1958 by Pablo Picasso, who was resident until 1962. Picasso and his wife Jacqueline are buried in the forecourt of the chateau, which is still the private property of the Picasso family.

== Climate ==
On average, Vauvenargues experiences 53.3 days per year with a minimum temperature below 0 °C (32.0 °F), 0.3 days per year with a minimum temperature below −10 °C (14.0 °F), 0.8 days per year with a maximum temperature below 0 °C (32.0 °F), and 31.3 days per year with a maximum temperature above 30 °C (86.0 °F). The record high temperature was 41.0 °C (105.8 °F) on 28 June 2019, while the record low temperature was −12.3 °C (9.9 °F) on 2 February 2011.

Climate data for Vauvenargues (1991–2020 normals, extremes 1990–present)
Month	Jan	Feb	Mar	Apr	May	Jun	Jul	Aug	Sep	Oct	Nov	Dec	Year
Record high °C (°F)	20.3 (68.5)	20.6 (69.1)	23.6 (74.5)	26.9 (80.4)	30.5 (86.9)	41.0 (105.8)	37.3 (99.1)	37.8 (100.0)	32.2 (90.0)	28.9 (84.0)	22.3 (72.1)	20.3 (68.5)	41.0 (105.8)
Mean daily maximum °C (°F)	9.0 (48.2)	10.1 (50.2)	13.5 (56.3)	16.3 (61.3)	20.8 (69.4)	25.6 (78.1)	28.8 (83.8)	28.7 (83.7)	23.3 (73.9)	18.0 (64.4)	12.5 (54.5)	9.4 (48.9)	18.0 (64.4)
Daily mean °C (°F)	4.8 (40.6)	5.2 (41.4)	8.2 (46.8)	10.8 (51.4)	14.9 (58.8)	19.1 (66.4)	21.9 (71.4)	21.8 (71.2)	17.4 (63.3)	13.3 (55.9)	8.3 (46.9)	5.4 (41.7)	12.6 (54.7)
Mean daily minimum °C (°F)	0.6 (33.1)	0.3 (32.5)	2.9 (37.2)	5.3 (41.5)	9.0 (48.2)	12.6 (54.7)	14.9 (58.8)	14.9 (58.8)	11.5 (52.7)	8.6 (47.5)	4.2 (39.6)	1.4 (34.5)	7.2 (44.9)
Record low °C (°F)	−9.7 (14.5)	−12.3 (9.9)	−9.8 (14.4)	−3.3 (26.1)	−1.4 (29.5)	4.5 (40.1)	5.9 (42.6)	7.3 (45.1)	1.6 (34.9)	−5.0 (23.0)	−9.1 (15.6)	−10.6 (12.9)	−12.3 (9.9)
Average precipitation mm (inches)	65.7 (2.59)	42.4 (1.67)	44.5 (1.75)	70.9 (2.79)	62.2 (2.45)	41.0 (1.61)	24.4 (0.96)	28.0 (1.10)	94.9 (3.74)	94.6 (3.72)	105.1 (4.14)	64.4 (2.54)	738.1 (29.06)
Average precipitation days (≥ 1.0 mm)	6.3	4.8	5.5	7.3	6.3	4.1	2.6	3.1	5.8	6.8	7.8	6.2	66.6
Source: Meteociel

== See also ==
- Communes of the Bouches-du-Rhône department
