= A139 autoroute =

Road in France

A139 autoroute

Route information
- Maintained by SANEF Paris Normandie
- Length: 3 km (1.9 mi)
- Existed: 1970–present

Major junctions
- South end: E5 / E46 / E402 / A 13 near Oissel

- North end: N 138 near Petit-Couronne

Location
- Country: France
- Major cities: Rouen

Highway system
- Roads in France; Autoroutes; Routes nationales

Autoroute 139 is a highway in France that links the A13 and Rouen. It begins at A13 and ends in the outskirts of Rouen on the N138. It has a total length of 3.0 kilometres (1.9 mi).

The motorway was built in 1970 and was numbered A930 upon opening.

== List of junctions ==
Region	Department	Junctions	Destinations	Notes
Normandie	Seine-Maritime	A13 - A139	Paris, Évreux, Oissel	
Normandie	Seine-Maritime	1 : Les Essarts	Grand-Couronne, Zone Portuaire	
Normandie	Seine-Maritime	RN 138 - A139	Caen (A13), Le Havre, Le Mans (A28), Grand-Couronne	
1.000 mi = 1.609 km; 1.000 km = 0.621 mi
