= A14 autoroute =

Controlled-access highway from La Défense to Orgeval, France

A14 autoroute

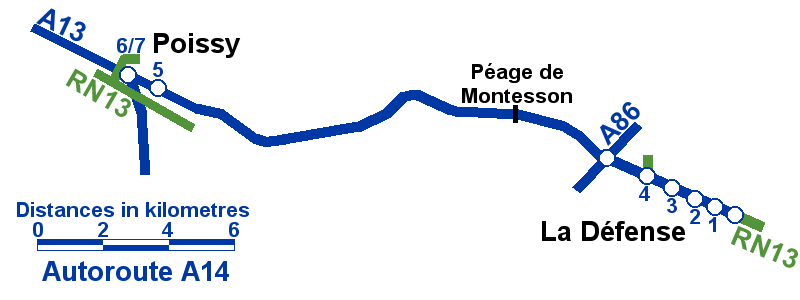

Route information
- Length: 21 km (13 mi)
- Existed: 1996–present

Major junctions
- East end: N 13 in La Défense

- A 86 in Nanterre

- West end: E5 / A 13 in Orgeval

Location
- Country: France

Highway system
- Roads in France; Autoroutes; Routes nationales

The autoroute A14 is an autoroute in the western suburbs of Paris, France. It connects the business district of La Défense, at Nanterre (Hauts-de-Seine), to Orgeval (Yvelines) where it joins the A13. Its operation is managed by the Sanef group.

== History ==
The motorway starts at La Défense in Hauts-de-Seine and ends at Orgeval in Yvelines. The A14 was built to relieve the congested A13 between Paris and Normandy. The A14, opened in 1996, is operated by the Société des Autoroutes de Paris Normandie. The motorway is 21 km (13 mi) in length and is subject to a toll. The A14 serves no localities between La Défense and Orgeval and is only a relief road of the A13.

A motorway exit near Saint-Germain-en-Laye was planned but were denied by the French president, François Mitterrand, after mayors wanted to prevent excessive car use in the Forest of Saint-Germain-en-Laye. Other exits were planned but their construction was blocked by communal councils.

A motorway exit was projected west of the Montesson toll booths. The mayor of Montesson had placed a condition on approval of the project that the exit may be constructed if a dual-carriageway relieving the RD121 is also built. Public consultation is in progress.

Many bridges and tunnels were built to carry the motorway. Two long bridges and a tunnel of 2.8 km long were built. The tunnel, built for 4.5 billion FRF, was built to preserve the forest of Saint-Germain.

The toll has a price that varies with the hours of the day. Free access to the motorway is given to drivers practising carpooling.

On June 19, 2024, the A14 became the first to utilize automated number plate recognition to determine the vehicle type and distance travelled to calculate the fee, thereby eliminating the requirement for toll booths.

== Route ==
The A14 autoroute begins in the west at Orgeval as a split from A13. It heads south-east through Poissy heading through its first tunnel and then a second with the D30 roundabout above it, and an onramp (6b) from the former enters the A14. Continuing east, there is an exit 6 to Chambourcy via the N13. Passing under the bridge of the Route de Poissy it heads south-east passing under another roundabout in Chambourcy that allows an onramp onto the A14 (6a). Shortly after this onramp, the A14 turns east then northeast passing through the southern end of the Foret Domaniale St-Germain-en-Laye as a tunnel. It exits the tunnel briefly at Saint-Germain-en-Laye just after passing under the N184 and D190 interchange before entering another tunnel and continuing under the forest. It exits the tunnel and forest near La Grille Royale and crosses the Seine river as the Viaduc Autoroutier de Montesson.

After crossing the Seine, it heads in an easterly direction crossing over the D121 on the northern outskirts of Montesson before reaching the toll station at the Gare de Peage de Montesson. Leaving the toll booth, it enters a short tunnel under the Route de Saint-Germain D311, before passing through a set of three further short tunnels as the A14 passes through the suburbs of Carrieres-sur-Seine. Leaving the town it turns south-east crossing the Seine river again that is split by the Ile Fleurie.

As the bridge ends, there is an exit to the A86 Nanterre or the D986 Nanterre Centre. Shortly after that exit, the A14 enters the Nanterre-La Defense tunnel heading east through Nanterre passing under the A86 interchange. Just after passing under the interchange, inside the tunnel, the A86 South has an onramp to the A14. In the tunnel, under La Defense, there is an exit to the D914 followed shortly by a tunnel onramp from the N13 South and from the north, the D992 enters the A14 (Avenue de la Division Leclerc). The A14 exits the tunnel just before Pont de Neuilly and ends as it continues south-east as the N13 into Paris.

== List of junctions ==
Region	Department	Junctions	Destinations	Notes
Île-de-France	Hauts-de-Seine	1 : Suresnes	Courbevoie, Puteaux, Villeneuve-la-Garenne, Suresnes, Asnières-sur-Seine, Boulogne-Billancourt	
Île-de-France	Hauts-de-Seine	Exit	Courbevoie, La Défense, Puteaux, Nanterre	Entry and exit from Paris
Île-de-France	Hauts-de-Seine	2 : La Garenne-Colombes	Courbevoie, La Garenne-Colombes, La Défense	Entry and exit from Paris
Île-de-France	Hauts-de-Seine	3 : Rueil-Malmaison (RD 913)	Puteaux, Nanterre, Rueil-Malmaison	Entry and exit from Paris
Île-de-France	Hauts-de-Seine	4 : Nanterre - La Défense	Puteaux, Nanterre, La Défense	Entry and exit from A13
Île-de-France	Hauts-de-Seine	A86 - A14	Lille (A1), Cergy-Pontoise (A15), Versailles, Saint-Denis, Colombes, Saint-Germain-en-Laye par RD, Nanterre - Autres Quartiers	
Île-de-France	Yvelines			
Île-de-France	Yvelines	Péage de Montesson		
Île-de-France	Yvelines	6/6a : Chambourcy (RD 113)	Chambourcy, Saint-Germain-en-Laye	
Île-de-France	Yvelines	6b : Poissy	Poissy - La Maladrerie	Entry and exit from Paris
Île-de-France	Yvelines	7 : Orgeval	Poissy - centre, Orgeval, Villennes-sur-Seine	Entry and exit from Paris
Île-de-France	Yvelines	A13 - A14	Rouen, Mantes-la-Jolie, Caen, Les Mureaux-Meulan	Entry and exit from A13 Westbound
A 14 ends and continues as E5 / A 13
1.000 mi = 1.609 km; 1.000 km = 0.621 mi
