= Route nationale 12 =

Road in France

The Route nationale 12, or RN12, is a trunk road (nationale) in France connecting Paris with Brittany. The road forms part of European route E50. It is approximately 570 km (350 mi) long.

== History ==
Until the 1950s, the RN 12 followed a different itinerary between Mayenne and Rennes. At Mayenne, the RN 12 was going south to Laval (now RN 162) then going west to Vitré and Rennes (now RD 57 and 857, former RN 157). The itinerary from nowadays was named RN 155 until Fougères and RN 177 from Fougères to Rennes.

The RN12 has been superseded into a freeway in a big part of its itinary; the old road has been re-numbered as the RD912, RD812 and RD712.

== Route ==
Paris-Dreux-Rennes-Brest

=== Trappes to Dreux (0 km - 62 km) ===
The road starts southwest of Paris as a branch of the Route nationale 10, the old road at Trappes starting as the Rue de Dreux and heading west. The new road is autoroute standard and starts as an extension of the RN286 at its junction with the A12 autoroute.

Both routes pass round the Étang de Saint-Quentin before merging at Plaisir; the old road course is often numbered RD912. The road heads west, crossing the Forêt des Quatre Piliers (184 m). The road now bypasses the small town of Houdan and crosses the river Eure into the city of Dreux, one of many that circle Paris.

=== Dreux to Rennes (62 km to 324 km) ===
The road leaves Dreux and heads broadly southwest through rolling countryside of southern Normandy. It passes the town of Saint-Lubin-des-Joncherets, now in the upper valley of the river Avre. It next comes to Verneuil-sur-Avre, where the RN26 heads northeast to Caen. The countryside is more wooded now as the road crosses the Les Bois Francs before coming to the Forêt du Perche.

At Mortagne-au-Perche the road becomes autoroute standard again and the old course of the road taken by the D912. The area is classified a Parc naturel régional du Perche, featuring forests and hills up to 256 m. After Le Mêle-sur-Sarthe the road enters the Parc naturel régional Normandie-Maine. The road then crosses the A28 autoroute and RD138 at the town of Alençon.

The road continues west through increasingly undulating countryside. In the Forêt de Multonne Mont Souprat rises to 385 m. At Pré-en-Pail the RD176 heads northwest to the coast and Avranches. The road heads southwest below hills such as Mont du Saule and Bois de Buleu both 327 m high. The road next enters Mayenne. The RN162 heads south from here to Laval. The road next reaches Ernée crossing the Forêt de Mayenne (215 m). The road crosses open country to Fougères, which the RN12 passes to the southwest. The RN12 then joins the A84 autoroute; the old road is now the RD812. It passes the village of Saint-Aubin-du-Cormier then the Forêt de Liffré and then Forêt de Rennes. The road then enters the city of Rennes.

=== Rennes to Brest (324 km to 570 km) ===
At Rennes there are junctions with the RN137, RN136 (E50) and RN24 to Lorient. The RN12 now heads northwest into Brittany also classed the European route E50. The road passes up the Garun valley south of the Forêt de Montauban. The countryside is now a mix of rolling hills and tight river valleys. Due to an old royal act of parliament, roads cannot be tolled within Brittany, and so the RN12 was upgraded to autoroute standard but not numbered as such. The RN12's old course is numbered RD712. The road has a junction with the RN176 (E401) to Dinan. The road passes Lamballe before reaching the coast and a bay at Yffiniac. The road then enters the town and port of Saint-Brieuc on the southwest corner of the Baie de Saint Brieuc on the English Channel.

The RN12 heads west with the old road the RD712. It passes through the Bois de Malaunay before reaching the town of Guingamp. The road continues west past the Menez-Bré (302 m). The countryside becomes more and more undulating with steeper river valleys the Monts d'Arrée lie to the south (394 m). The road comes to Morlaix at the head of the river Jarlot. The road continues southwest to Landivisiau where the old road follows the scenic river Élorn past the Moulin de Brézal. The new road takes a more direct route to the north. At Landerneau the RD712 heads northwest leaving the estuary of the Élorn. The roads both enter the large Atlantic coast port of Brest from the east. Becoming the Rue de Paris on to the city centre. The RN165 heads south from the town to Quimper. The city lies on the north side of the Rade de Brest protected from the Atlantic by a headland with access through the natural channel of the Goulet de Brest.

== Village étape ==
The Autoroute is served by the following seven Village étapes, Bédée, Belle-Isle-en-Terre, Broons, Châtelaudren-Plouagat, Le Mêle-sur-Sarthe, Saint-Thégonnec and Tourouvre au Perche.he commune is listed as a Village étape.
