= N26 (disambiguation) =

N26 is a German bank.

N26 may also refer to:

- N26 (Long Island bus)
- BMW N26, an automobile engine
- Escadrille N26, a unit of the French Air Force
- London Buses route N26
- N26 road (Ireland)
- Route nationale 26, in France

== See also ==
- 26N (disambiguation)
