= A12 autoroute =

Controlled-access highway from the A13 in Bailly to Trappes

A12 autoroute

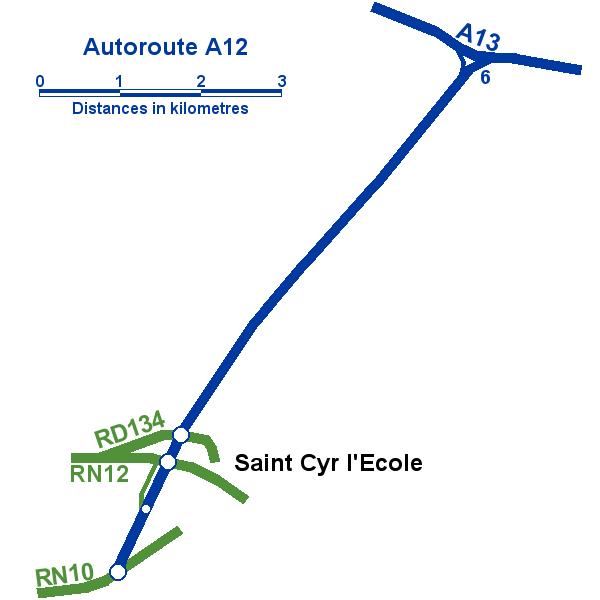

Route information
- Maintained by DIR Île-de-France
- Length: 8.5 km (5.3 mi)
- Existed: 1950–present

Major junctions
- South end: N 10 in Montigny-le-Bretonneux

- N 12 in Bois-d'Arcy

- North end: E5 / A 13 in Bailly

Location
- Country: France

Highway system
- Roads in France; Autoroutes; Routes nationales

Autoroute A12, is a French autoroute located in Yvelines, near Paris. It branches off from A13 (also known as the Motorway of Normandy) at an exchange known as the Triangle de Rocquencourt located in the town of Bailly and merges with RN12 and RN10 at Bois-d'Arcy. Its total length is 8.5 km (5.3 mi). Access is free.

It has not been lengthened since its construction, which makes it the oldest French motorway to have remained on its original route.

== History ==
Its history started in 1934 with the publication of Plan Prost, which envisaged a network, already dense, of motorways in Île-de-France. The A12 was then known as the "Autoroute de Bretagne", which is a reference to its proximity to the nearby RN12 route which extends to Brittany. Its construction began in 1936 with the first deforestation on the site of the Triangle de Rocquencourt. Work ceased at the outbreak of war in 1939, with only earthworks having been executed. Work began again in the post-war period and lasted until 1950.

The motorway has not undergone any significant changes since that time. The changes that have occurred include the covering of a section at the Saint-Cyr-l'École and the widening of the roadway to four lanes in one direction and three in the other. It is on this motorway that one of the first automatic radars in Yvelines were installed.

There are plans to extend the A12 in the medium-term (2015–2020) up to Ablis and the A11. It is anticipated that the route will go around the town of Trappes. Beyond that point, the existing highway N10 will be reused.

This project, started back up in 2004 by the transport minister Gilles de Robien, caused significant concern among locals, such as the inhabitants of South of Yvelines. They object as they feel that this new section of highway will introduce transit of heavy lorries between the A10/A11 motorways and the western A86 tunnel (Rocquencourt), with traffic predictions as high as 100,000 vehicles per day. Others object to the extension crossing the Haute Vallée de Chevreuse Regional Park. A public consultation was organised in 2006.

In October 2006, following public consultation from March to June 2006, the Minister announced the choice of a 15 km long extension by median route 2C', comprising five interchanges and several covered trenches. This route provides for an extension that begins in a tunnel at the end of the current motorway, at the junction with the national road 10, then runs along, partially covered, Montigny and the Trappes business area and crosses, partly in a covered trench, the communes of La Verrière and Le Mesnil-Saint-Denis, and ends by bypassing Les Essarts-le-Roi from the west to join the RN 10 at the interchange with the RD 191. However, while this motorway project had been included in the Schéma directeur de la région Île-de-France (SDRIF) since 1965, it was withdrawn in its 2013 version.

== List of junctions ==
Region	Department	km	mi	Junction	Destinations	Notes
Île-de-France	Yvelines	0.0	0.0	RN 10 & RD 10 - A12	Montigny-le-Bretonneux, Trappes, Rambouillet	Southbound exit only to N10 West
Île-de-France	Yvelines	0.0	0.0	RN 10 & RD 10 - A12	Saint-Cyr-l'École, Bois-d'Arcy	Southbound exit only to N10 West
Île-de-France	Yvelines	1.0	0.6	8 : Saint-Quentin-en-Yvelines	Montigny-le-Bretonneux	Northbound entry only / Southbound exit only
Île-de-France	Yvelines	1.3	0.8	RN 12 - A12	Versailles - centre / Satory, Dreux, Évry, (A6) Lyon, Créteil (A86), Paris - Porte de Châtillon, Voisins-le-Bretonneux	Northbound exit N12 east only / Southbound exit N12 east & west
Île-de-France	Yvelines	2.4	1.5	7 : Bois-d'Arcy (RD 129)	Bois-d'Arcy, Saint-Cyr-l'École	Northbound entry only / Southbound exit only
Île-de-France	Yvelines	8.5	5.3	A13 - A12 + Le Chesnay-Rocquencourt	Paris - Porte de Saint-Cloud, Versailles - Montreuil, Nanterre (A86), Rouen, Poissy	
Île-de-France	Yvelines	8.5	5.3	A13 - A12 + Le Chesnay-Rocquencourt	Versailles - Notre-Dame, Rueil-Malmaison, Saint-Germain-en-Laye, Le Chesnay-Rocquencourt, Marly-le-Roi, La Celle-Saint-Cloud	
1.000 mi = 1.609 km; 1.000 km = 0.621 mi
