= Route départementale 612 =

Road in France

Route départementale 612, or RD 612, is located:

- in the departments of Hérault and Tarn, it connects Montpellier to Albi, taking over the old RN 112, which was downgraded in 2006.
- in the department of Pyrénées-Orientales, it connects Estagel to Elne, taking over the old RN 612, decommissioned in 1972.
- in the department of the Tarn, the RD 612 connects Albi to Castres in 42 kilometers.

== Accidents between Albi and Castres ==
This section has around 11,000 vehicles per day, including 1,000 trucks.

Between 2012 and 2017, the RD 612 counted between Albi and Castres 25 accidents, 9 killed, 44 injured, 25 of which were serious. Due to the numerous speed-related accidents, this section of road has four fixed speed cameras.

The president of the Tarn departmental council plans to increase the speed to 90 km/h on the section of the départmental 612 located between Albi and Castres.
