= Forest of Saint-Germain-en-Laye =

Forest in the Yvelines department of France

Forest of Saint-Germain-en-Laye French: Forêt de Saint-Germain-en-Laye
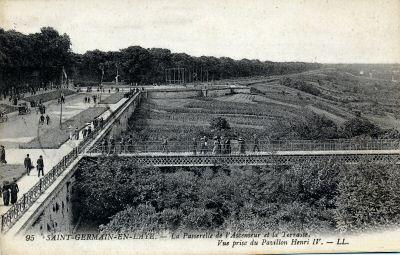
- The terrace adjoining the Castle of Saint-Germain.

- Location within France

Geography
- Location: Yvelines, Île-de-France, France
- Coordinates: 48°56′00″N 2°05′00″E
- Area: 35 km^{2} (14 sq mi)

Administration
- Status: Dominial

Ecology
- Dominant tree species: Sessile oak, European beech

The Forest of Saint-Germain-en-Laye or Forêt de Saint-Germain-en-Laye, is a dominial forest of 35 km^{2} (14 sq mi) in area which lies in a meander of the River Seine, France. Situated 20 km (12 mi) West of Paris, between Saint-Germain-en-Laye, Maisons-Laffitte, Achères and Poissy, It is situated entirely within the commune of Saint-Germain. Essentially composed of oak (53%) and beech (18%), it is now a forest bordered by built up areas and divided by communication links: route nationales, A14 and the railway line from Paris to Caen. The Fête des Loges is, every year, organised in an open space near Saint-Germain.

== History ==
The Forest of Laye is a relic of the ancient Forest of Yveline. Very early it became a royal domain and hunting grounds of the Kings of France who resided at the Château de Saint-Germain-en-Laye. Kings Henry IV and Louis XIII often used the forest for fox hunting. Louis XIV also walked the forest and hired an architect, André Le Nôtre, to build a terrace bordering the forest dominating the valley of the River Seine in 1663. He also built a high wall, finished by Napoléon, encircling the forest to prevent game from escaping the woods. After the abandonment of the forest of Saint-Germain in 1682 by Louis XIV, Charles X resumed the hunting tradition of Saint-Germain. Napoléon III purchased land to the South to link the forest of Saint-Germain with the Forest of Marly. The arrival of the railway in 1835, then the development of the car, considerably increased use of the forest.

Since the middle of the 19th century, the forest has lost 8 km^{2} (3.1 sq mi) of its surface area.

- In 1811 the Légion d'Honneur camp was built.
- In 1856, Napoléon III built a 0.25 km^{2} (0.097 sq mi) large firing range.
- In 1971, the French Army built a military base extending the firing range by 0.6 km^{2} (0.23 sq mi). The camp des Loges now occupies 0.5 km^{2} (0.19 sq mi).
- In 1889, the City of Paris purchased 4.3 km^{2} (1.7 sq mi) to the North of Achères to install a sewage system; the site is now home to the largest sewage plant in Île-de-France.
- In 1882, the Achères marshalling yard as well as an engine shed were built in the heart of the forest.
- The A14 motorway was opened in 1996. The then president of France, François Mitterrand, forced the builders to bury 1.5 km (0.93 mi) of the motorway in a tunnel and prevented the construction of a motorway exit intended to serve the city of Saint-Germain in order to reduce traffic in the forest.

== See also ==
- List of forests in France
