= Village étape =

Town providing services for highway travellers

A Village étape (French pronunciation: [vilaʒ etap]) is a French label given to a small town, typically under five thousand people, designated to provide a complete set of services for national or provincial highway travellers. While most do provide natural or cultural landmarks, activities or attractions in some form, the core requirements address quality or hours of operation for amenities such as restaurants, grocers, lodging and tourist information.

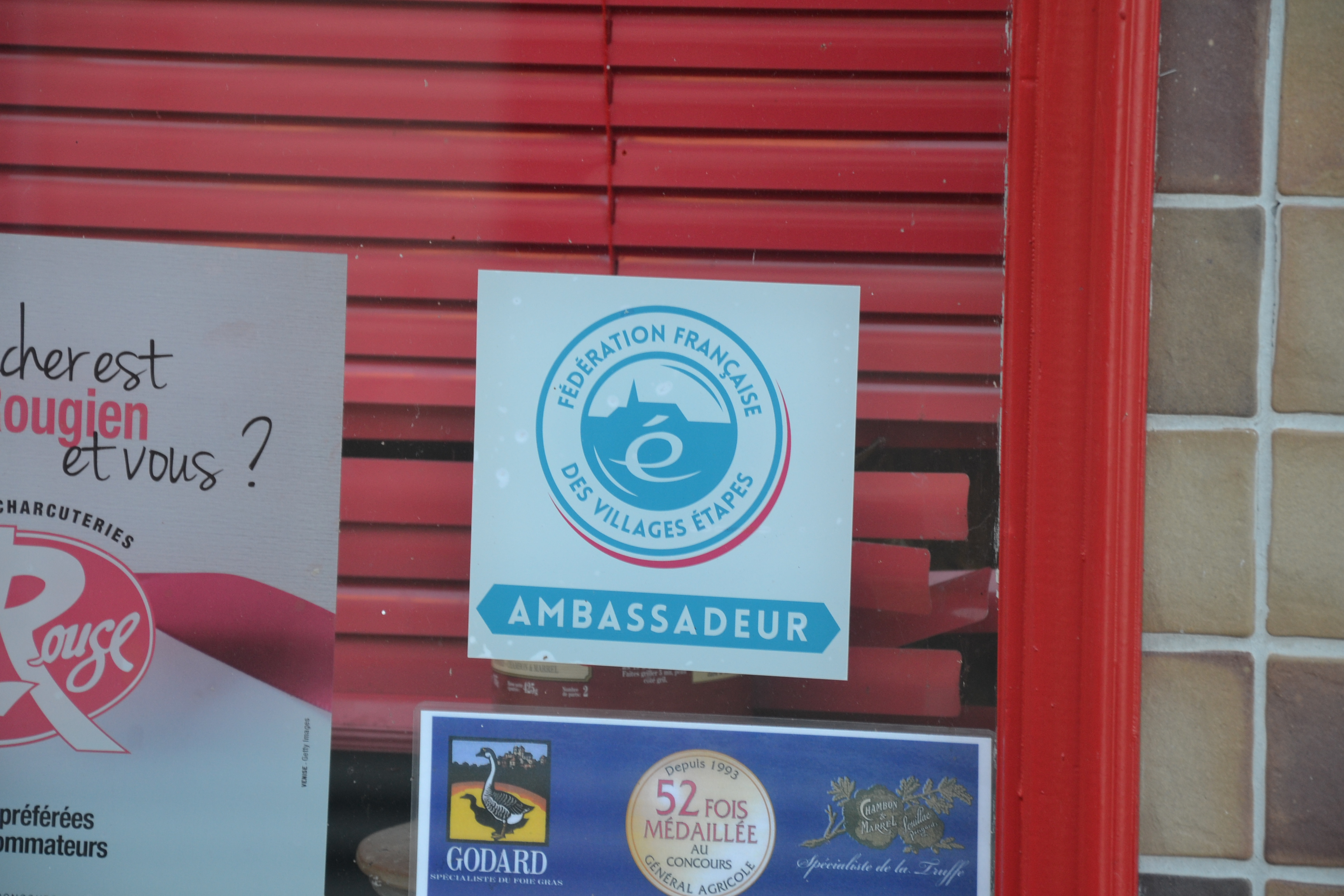
Village étape logo in shop window

== Village étape ==
The village étape association was created in 1989. The first Village étape was Bessines-sur-Gartempe in 1995. In France, a village étape is a village near or just off a motorway or national dual-carriageway that has been accepted by the "Village étape" Association as meeting the following criteria:

- Population under 5000
- A range of "basic" shops (butcher, baker, newsagent, grocer)
- A range of varied eating places
- A classified hotel
- A Tourist Information Centre
- A shaded parking area
- A telephone
- A picnic area
- Public toilets
- A Cash machine

The shopkeepers, hoteliers or restaurant keepers involved in the Village étape movement all have to sign the Villages étapes quality charter.

They can be easily identifiable by a "Philémon the hedgehog" sticker displayed in their windows.

== Current villages-étapes ==
As of April 2026 there are 77 communes listed as a Village étape:

1. Aumont-Aubrac - Lozère - A75
2. Baraqueville - Aveyron - N88
3. Barbezieux-Saint-Hilaire - Charente - RN10
4. Bédée - Ille-et-Vilaine - RN12
5. Bellac - Haute-Vienne - RN147
6. Belle-Isle-en-Terre - Côtes-d'Armor - RN12
7. Bergues - Nord - RN225
8. Bessines-sur-Gartempe - Haute-Vienne - A20
9. Bonneval - Eure-et-Loir - RN10
10. Brens - Tarn - A68
11. Broons - Côtes-d'Armor - RN12
12. Chabanais - Charente - RN141
13. Charolles - Saône et Loire - RN79
14. Châteaubourg - Ille-et-Vilaine - RN157
15. Châteauneuf-du-Faou - Finistère - RN164
16. Châtelaudren-Plouagat - Côtes-d'Armor - RN12
17. Chorges - Hautes-Alpes - RN94
18. Cloyes-les-Trois-Rivières - Eure-et-Loir - RN10
19. Crevin - Ille-et-Vilaine - RN137
20. Dol-de-Bretagne - Ille-et-Vilaine - RN176
21. Dompierre-sur-Besbre - Allier - A79
22. Donzenac - Corrèze - A20
23. Ducey - Manche - A84
24. Eguzon - Indre - A20
25. Elven - Morbihan - RN166
26. Florac Trois Rivières - Lozère - RN106
27. Gouzon - Creuse - RN145
28. Grand-Fougeray - Ille-et-Vilaine - N137
29. Jarnac - Charente - RN141
30. Joinville - Haute-Marne - RN67
31. Josselin - Morbihan - RN24
32. Jugon-les-Lacs - Côtes-d'Armor - RN176
33. La Mure - Isère - RN85
34. La Souterraine - Creuse - RN145
35. Laissac-Sévérac-l'Église - Aveyron - RN88
36. Lapalisse - Allier - RN7
37. Launois-sur-Vence - Ardennes - A34
38. Le Caylar - Hérault - A75
39. La Canourgue - Corrèze - A75
40. Le Mêle-sur-Sarthe - Orne - RN12
41. Ligny-en-Barrois - Meuse - RN4
42. Locminé - Morbihan - RN24
43. Magnac-Bourg - Haute-Vienne - A20
44. Mansle - Charente - RN10
45. Massiac - Cantal - A75
46. Mauléon - Deux-Sèvres - RN249
47. Merdrignac - Côtes-d'Armor - RN164
48. Montmarault - Allier - A79
49. Moûtiers - Savoie - RN90
50. Muzillac - Morbihan - RN165
51. Naucelle - Aveyron - RN88
52. Neufchâtel-en-Bray - Seine-Maritime - A28
53. Pierre-Buffière - Haute-Vienne - A20
54. Plélan-le-Grand - Ille-et-Vilaine - RN24
55. Plombières-les-Bains - Vosges - RN57
56. Pougues-les-Eaux - Nièvre - A77
57. Poix-Terron - Ardennes - A34
58. Puylaurens - Tarn - RN126
59. Rocroi - Ardennes - A304
60. Rostrenen - Côtes-d'Armor - RN164
61. Saint-Brice-en-Coglès - Ille-et-Vilaine - A84
62. Martres-Tolosane - Haute-Garonne - A64
63. Saint-Bonnet-en-Champsaur - Hautes-Alpes - RN85
64. Saint-Méen-le-Grand - Ille-et-Vilaine - RN164
65. Sainte-Mère-Église - Manche - RN13
66. Saint-Thégonnec - Finistère - RN12
67. Sézanne - Marne - RN4
68. Torigny-les-Villes - Manche - A84
69. Tourouvre au Perche - Orne - RN12
70. Uzerche - Corrèze - A20
71. Varennes-sur-Allier - Allier - RN7
72. Vatan - Indre - A20
73. Vic-Fezensac - Gers - RN124
74. Villedieu-les-Poêles-Rouffigny - Manche - A84
75. Villers-Bocage - Calvados - A84
76. Vivonne - Vienne - RN10
77. Vouillé - Vienne - RN149

== Similar schemes across the world ==
- Village rélais – A Canadian scheme based in Québec started in 2009 based on the Village Etape.
