= N23 =

N23 may refer to:

== Roads ==
- N23 road (Belgium)
- Route nationale 23, in France
- N23 road (Ireland)
- Nebraska Highway 23, in the United States

== Other uses ==
- N23 (Long Island bus)
- Escadrille N23, a squadron of the French Air Force
- Nieuport 23, a French First World War fighter
- Nitrogen-23, an isotope of nitrogen
- Northrop N-23 Pioneer, an American transport aircraft
- Sidney Municipal Airport (New York), in Delaware County, New York, United States
