= A13 autoroute =

Controlled-access highway from Paris to Caen

A13 autoroute

Route information
- Part of E5 / E46 / E402
- Maintained by SANEF Paris Normandie and DIR Île-de-France
- Length: 225 km (140 mi)
- Existed: 1946–present

Major junctions
- East end: E5 Périphérique (Paris) in Paris
- A 86 in Vaucresson; A 12 in Bailly; A 14 in Orgeval; A 154 in Val-de-Reuil; A 139 in Oissel; E402 / A 28 in Bourg-Achard; E5 / A 131 in Bourneville; A 29 in Beuzeville; A 132 in Pont-l'Évêque; A 813 in Banneville-la-Campagne

- West end: E46 / N 814 (Périphérique Caen) in Caen

Location
- Country: France
- Major cities: Paris, Mantes-la-Jolie, Rouen, Pont-l'Évêque, Caen

Highway system
- Roads in France; Autoroutes; Routes nationales

Autoroute 13, or L'Autoroute de Normandie links Paris to Caen, Calvados.

The motorway starts in Paris at the Porte d'Auteuil, a former gate of the Paris walls, and ends at Mondeville's Mondeville 2 (Porte de Paris) exchange junction on the Boulevard Périphérique (Caen). The A13 is France's oldest motorway (opening in 1946) and is intensively used between Paris and Normandy for both commuting and holiday makers. The A13 is operated by the SANEF Paris Normandie from Buchelay toll onwards, and the Parisian stretch of motorway is operated by the Île-de-France Council. Its total length is 225 km (140 mi). The A13 is toll-free within the Île-de-France region and between Junctions 21 and 24 to the south of Rouen.

== History ==
The France carried out its first studies in 1927 to create the l'Autoroute de l'Ouest, which was to connect the capital to Normandy. In addition, Le Havre and Cherbourg were important stopovers for luxury liners at a time that there were few commercial aircraft. Delayed by the historic nature of Parc de Saint-Cloud, the project was declared a public utility on 5 May 1935. The initial highway was planned with a start at the Pont de Saint-Cloud and heading west to Rocquencourt, where it would connect to the old N190 route to Orgeval and old N10 route to Trappes. The new route was accompanied by the reconstruction of the Pont de Saint-Cloud and was completed in April 1940. The other major project was the 800 m (2,600 ft) Saint-Cloud tunnel, which was to open at the end of 1940, but the German occupation of France prevented its completion, and it was used as storage for weapons. The route, from Saint-Cloud-Ouest to Vaucresson in the direction of Orgeval, was opened to the public on 4 October 1941. The tunnel works resumed from October 1945, with the tunnel surfaced and tiled.

The complex was opened to traffic on 9 June 1946 on the occasion of the first post-war motor race. The highway was completely free, financed entirely from state funds. At the Triangle de Rocquencourt, the exit to Trappes was via a ramp on the left, which was a curiosity, as traffic was on the right. The highway was credited until the 1960s with one star in the Michelin green guide Environs de Paris because of its absolute modernity and novelty.

The French motorways were then named in relation to the national roads they run along, hence the A13 because of the proximity of the N13.

The decree of 12 June 1967 declared the construction of the motorway between Rouen (Les Essarts) and Caen to be a public utility.

Until 1974, the A13 stopped at the Pont de Saint-Cloud. Since then, it has been connected to the Paris ring road by the Saint-Cloud viaduct overlooking the Seine and by a tunnel under the northern Boulogne-Billancourt, cutting through the garden of Château Rothschild.

As part of the connection of the A86 motorway, the first part of the 10 km tunnel, known as the Duplex A86, between Rueil-Malmaison and Vaucresson which was put into service in June 2009, it was decided to add a fourth lane in both directions and to install acoustic screens between the A13/A86 interchange and the Triangle de Rocquencourt. The interchanges between the A13 and A12 on one side and the A13 and RN 186 on the other, were redeveloped to improve traffic flow. The fourth lane in the westbound direction from Paris provides easy access to the Triangle de Rocquencourt. It was inaugurated in January 2011. The fourth lane in an eastbound direction to Paris was inaugurated in July 2011. The six-month delay was explained by the need to build "a mobile guardrail on this fourth lane" which is a lane assigned to the Duplex A86 tunnel.

On 3 September 2019, after three years of construction (2016–2019), a third overpass at the Guerville viaduct was commissioned in the eastbound direction to Paris, renovated the two existing overpasses (direction westbound) dating from the 1960s, without cutting off traffic.

In December 2024, traditional toll booths were removed from the motorway and replaced by a free flow (flux libre) tolling system, using automated license plate recognition and online payment for users without electronic toll collection. However, the toll charges remain and drivers not using télépéage have 72 hours to pay the charge online. This caused tourists to assume that the A13 was free to use since it was unclear that the toll charges remain and that the signage was only in French. Many motorists have called for information to also be provided in English to help tourists.

== List of junctions ==
Region	Department	Junction	Destinations	Notes
Île-de-France	Paris			
Île-de-France	Paris	Boulevard Périphérique - A13	Périphérique Nord : Charles-de-Gaulle, Lille (A1), La Défense, Paris - Porte de Passy	
Île-de-France	Paris	Boulevard Périphérique - A13	Périphérique Sud : Orly, Lyon (A6), Metz-Nancy (A4) Paris - centre, Porte de Saint-Cloud	
Île-de-France	Paris	1 : Paris - Porte d'Auteuil	Paris	Exit from Caen
Île-de-France	Hauts-de-Seine	2 : Bois-de-Boulogne	Bois de Boulogne	Exit from Caen
Île-de-France	Hauts-de-Seine	3 : Boulogne-Billancourt	Boulogne-Billancourt, Sèvres, Suresnes	Entry and exit from Caen
Île-de-France	Hauts-de-Seine	4 : Saint-Cloud	Ville-d'Avray, Saint-Cloud	Exit from Caen
Île-de-France	Hauts-de-Seine	5 : Vaucresson	Versailles - centre, Montreuil, Vaucresson, La Celle-Saint-Cloud, Garches, Marnes-la-Coquette	
Île-de-France	Hauts-de-Seine	A86 - A13	Nanterre, Créteil, A14 , A10	
Île-de-France	Yvelines	6 : Le Chesnay-Rocquencourt	Saint-Germain-en-Laye, Versailles - centre, Notre-Dame, Marly-le-Roi, Le Chesnay-Rocquencourt	
Île-de-France	Yvelines	A12 - A13	Dreux, Rambouillet, Saint-Quentin-en-Yvelines, Évry, Lyon (A6), Bois d'Arcy, Versailles - Satory	
Île-de-France	Yvelines	7 : Orgeval	A14, Poissy, Chambourcy, Villennes-sur-Seine, Orgeval, Saint-Germain-en-Laye, Nanterre, La Défense par RD	
Île-de-France	Yvelines	A14 - A13	Lille (A1), Saint-Germain-en-Laye, A86, Nanterre, La Défense, Paris - Porte Maillot	Entry and exit from Caen
Île-de-France	Yvelines	Aire de Morainvilliers		
Île-de-France	Yvelines	8 : Les Mureaux	Les Mureaux-Meulan, Ecquevilly	Eastbound exit only / Westbound entry only
Île-de-France	Yvelines	9 : Flins	Flins, Aubergenville, Z. I. Mureaux, Usine Renault de Flins	
Île-de-France	Yvelines	Aire d'Épône		
Île-de-France	Yvelines	10 : Épône	Rambouillet, Épône-Mézières, Gargenville	
Île-de-France	Yvelines	11 : Mantes - est	Mantes-la-Jolie - centre, Mantes-la-Ville - centre, Limay, Beauvais	
Île-de-France	Yvelines	12 : Mantes - sud	Dreux, Mantes-la-Jolie - Gassicourt, Mantes-la-Ville - Les Brouets, Magnanville	
Île-de-France	Yvelines	13 : Mantes - ouest	Vernon, Évreux, Buchelay, Rosny-sur-Seine, Bréval, Mantes-la-Jolie - Les Garennes	Entry and exit from Paris
Île-de-France	Yvelines	Péage de Buchelay (Flux Péage)		
Île-de-France	Yvelines	Aire de Rosny		
Île-de-France	Yvelines	14 : Bonnières	Vernon, Bonnières	Entry and exit from Paris
Île-de-France	Yvelines	Aire de la Villeneuve-en-Chevrie		
Île-de-France	Yvelines	15 : Chaufour (RN 13)	Évreux, Pacy-sur-Eure, Bonnières	
Normandie	Eure	Aire de Douains		
Normandie	Eure	16 : Vernon	Vernon, Pacy-sur-Eure	
Normandie	Eure	Aire de Beauchêne		
Normandie	Eure	17 : Gaillon	Gaillon, Les Andelys	
Normandie	Eure	18 : Heudebouville	Louviers - La Roquette, Heudebouville, ÉcoParc	
Normandie	Eure	Péage d'Heudebouville (Flux Péage)		
Normandie	Eure	Aire de Vironvay		
Normandie	Eure	19 : Val-de-Reuil	Louviers - centre, Val-de-Reuil, La Fringale, A154	Entry and exit from Paris and entry to Caen
Normandie	Eure	A154 - A13	Évreux, Orléans, Louviers, Dreux, Val-de-Reuil	Entry and exit from Caen
Normandie	Eure	Aire de Bord		
Normandie	Eure	20 : Criquebeuf	Vernon, Criquebeuf-sur-Seine, Elbeuf - est, Pont-de-l'Arche	
Normandie	Seine-Maritime	21 : Tourville	Elbeuf - centre, Oissel, Cléon, Tourville-la-Rivière	
Normandie	Seine-Maritime	22 : Oissel	Calais (A28), Amiens - Reims (A29) Oissel, Saint-Étienne-du-Rouvray, Rouen - est	
Normandie	Seine-Maritime	E5 / A 13 becomes E5 / E46 / E402 / A 13		
Normandie	Seine-Maritime	A139 - A13	Rouen - centre, Grand-Couronne, Zone Portuaire	Entry and exit from Paris
Normandie	Seine-Maritime	23 : Rouen - ouest (RN 138)	Rouen - centre, Elbeuf, Grand-Couronne, Zone Portuaire	Entry and exit from Caen
Normandie	Seine-Maritime	24 : Maison Brûlée	Caen, Alençon, Grand-Couronne, Bourgtheroulde	
Normandie	Eure	Aire de Bosguet		
Normandie	Eure	A28 - A13	Bordeaux (A10), Le Mans, Alençon	
Normandie	Eure	E5 / E46 / E402 / A 13 becomes E5 / E46 / A 13		
Normandie	Eure	25 : Bourg-Achard	Fécamp, Yvetot, Bourg-Achard, Pont de Brotonne	
Normandie	Eure	Aire de Rougemontiers (Westbound); Aire d'Éturqueraye (Eastbound)		
Normandie	Eure	26 : Bourneville	Pont-Audemer - est, Brionne, Bourneville-Sainte-Croix	
Normandie	Eure	A131 - A13	Le Havre, Pont de Tancarville	Entry and exit from Paris
Normandie	Eure	E5 / E46 / A 13 becomes E46 / A 13		
Normandie	Eure	Aire de Josapha (Westbound); Aire du Moulin (Eastbound)		
Normandie	Eure	27 : Pont-Audemer	Toutainville, Pont-Audemer - centre	Entry and exit from Paris
Normandie	Eure	28 : Beuzeville	Pont-Audemer, Beuzeville	
Normandie	Eure	Péage de Beuzeville (Flux Péage)		
Normandie	Eure	Aire de Beuzeville		
Normandie	Eure	A29 - A13	Calais, Amiens, Le Havre, Honfleur, Pont de Normandie	
Normandie	Calvados	A132 - A13	Lisieux, Deauville-Trouville, Pont-l'Évêque	
Normandie	Calvados	29 : La Haie-Tondue	Drubec, Villers-sur-Mer, Saint-Pierre-sur-Dives	Entry and exit from Paris
Normandie	Calvados	Aire d'Annebault (Westbound); Aire de Beaumont-en-Auge (Eastbound)		
Normandie	Calvados	Péage de Dozulé (Flux Péage)		
Normandie	Calvados	30 : Dozulé	Houlgate, Cabourg, Dives-sur-Mer, Dozulé	
Normandie	Calvados	31 : Troarn	Troarn, Sannerville	
Normandie	Calvados	A813 - A13	Mézidon-Canon, Bellengreville, Frénouville, Falaise (A88)	
Normandie	Calvados	Aire de Giberville		
Normandie	Calvados	Périphérique de Caen (RN 814) - A13	Périphérique Nord : Caen - centre, Hérouville-Saint-Clair, Ouistreham, C.H.U	
Normandie	Calvados	Périphérique de Caen (RN 814) - A13	Périphérique Sud : Alençon (A83), Rennes, Nantes (A84), Cherbourg-en-Cotentin, Mondeville	
1.000 mi = 1.609 km; 1.000 km = 0.621 mi
