= Route nationale 13 =

Road in France

National road 13

Route information
- Length: 331 km (206 mi)

Major junctions
- West end: Rond-point de la Pyrotechnie in Cherbourg-en-Cotentin
- East end: Place de Porte Maillot in Paris

Location
- Country: France

Highway system
- Roads in France; Autoroutes; Routes nationales

The N13 is a trunk road (route nationale) in France between Paris and Cherbourg.

== Route ==
=== Paris to Évreux, km 0 to km 91 ===
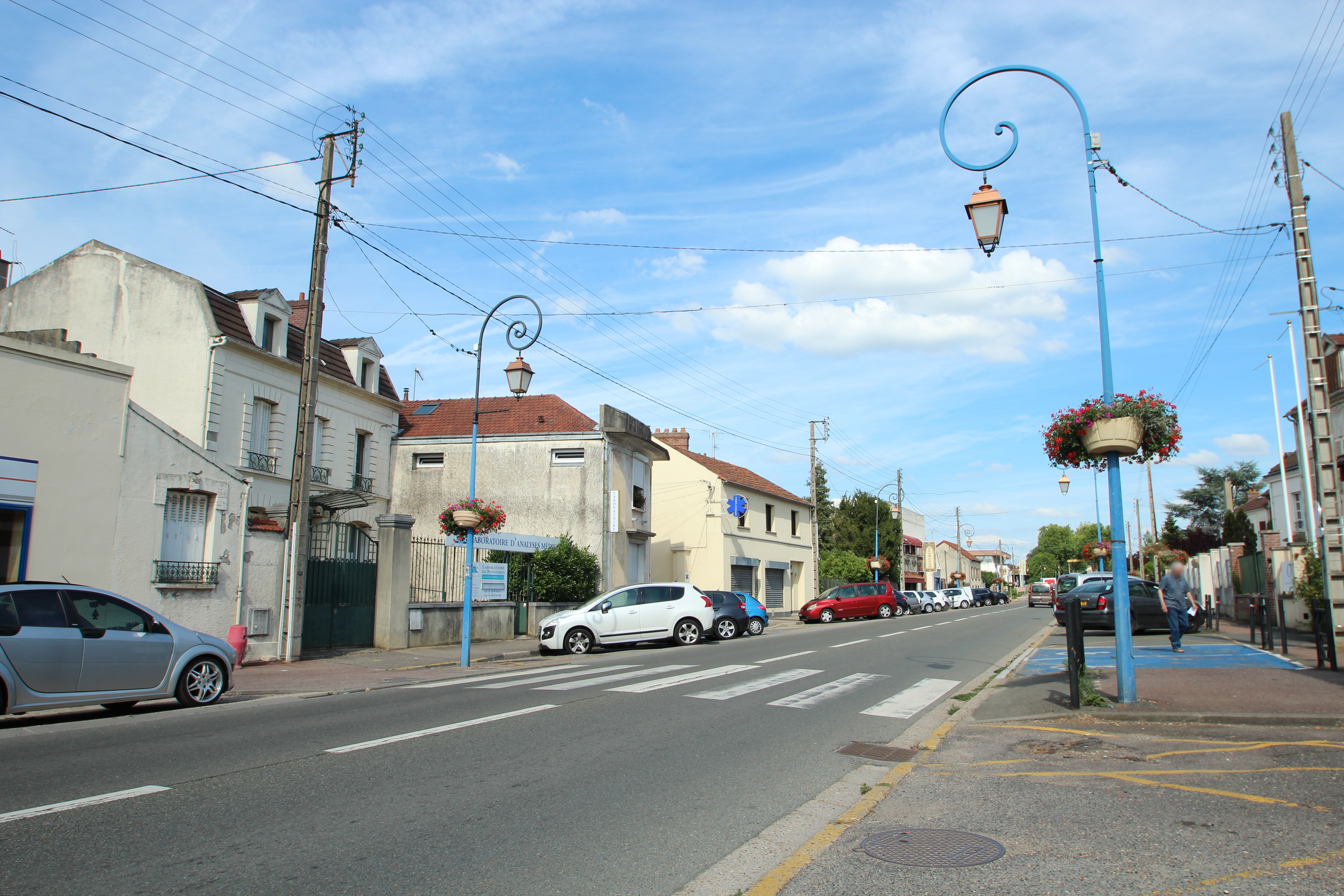
N13 in Bonnières-sur-Seine, Yvelines

The road begins at Porte Maillot, one of former gates in western Paris, in direct alignment with the Champs-Élysées. Continuing on this alignment, the road reaches La Défense after crossing the Seine. Then, as the Boulevard circulaire, orbits around La Défense. To the west of La Défense, the A14 autoroute leaves Paris towards Orgeval and the A13 autoroute.

Breaking from its previous straight course, the N13 follows the curves of the river Seine to reach Saint-Germain-en-Laye, passing Nanterre, Le Port-Marly on the way. Exiting Saint-Germain-en-Laye and Chambourcy, the N13 resumes a linear course towards Normandy, crossing the A13 autoroute at Orgeval.

The road heads West through Aubergenville and Mantes-la-Jolie. At Bonnières-sur-Seine the N 15 to Le Havre branches off North-West while the N 13 heads West. The road crosses the A13 again through rolling countryside to Pacy-sur-Eure and then to Évreux. There, a junction here with the RN154 was built in the 1990s following the upgrading of the N154 to motorway status from Louviers to La Madeleine-de-Nonancourt.

=== Évreux to Caen, km 91 to km 210 ===
The road between Évreux and Caen follows a straight course of a former Roman road linking Paris to Normandy. The road crosses the river Risle and the A28 autoroute at La Rivière-Thibouville. The road bypasses the town of Lisieux before dropping into the Plaine de Caen, where it crosses the river Dives. The road then heads Northwest into Caen in which the N13 is now de-classified.

=== Caen to Cherbourg km 210 to km 331 ===
After Caen, the road continues northwest past the Ardenne Abbey and around the historic town of Bayeux. The road's old course out of Bayeux has been numbered RD 513 while the new road, a dual carriageway, follows a non-linear course towards Carentan. The road passes the small town of Carentan and turns North towards Valognes and then the port of Cherbourg. Carentan bypass, built between 1994 and 1996, goes underneath the Canal de Carentan, where signals control access to the tunnel below the waterway.

== Village étape ==
The route is served by the following Village étape, Sainte-Mère-Église.

== Declassification ==
The course of the RN 13 has changed little since its creation but has been largely renumbered and its maintenance is mainly in the hands of local authorities; DDE. The N13 has been completely de-classified between Paris and Chauffour-lès-Bonnières (except in Neuilly-sur-Seine and in Saint-Germain-en-Laye) and between Parville and Caen.

Although the road remains heavily used, traffic has diminished since the opening of the A13 autoroute.
