= Route nationale 138 =

Road in France

National road 138
- Route nationale 138
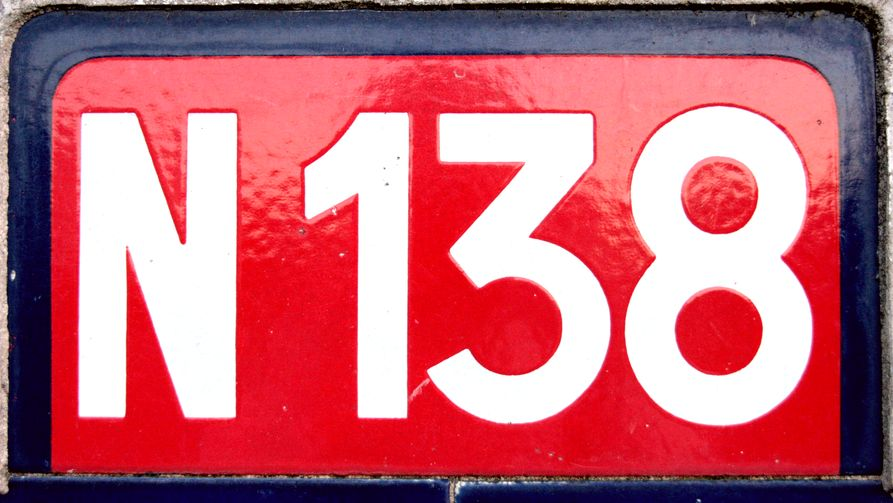

Route information
- Length: 282 km (175 mi)
- Existed: 1972–2006

Major junctions
- Northeast end: D 6014 D 6015 at Rouen

- A 13 E5 D 6175; D 613; A 88 D 958 at Sées; N 12 at Alençon; A 11 E50 D 323 D 357 au Mans

- Southwest end: D 910 D 952 at Tours

Location
- Country: France
- Regions: Centre-Val de Loire, Normandy, Pays de la Loire
- Departments: Eure, Indre-et-Loire, Orne, Sarthe, Seine-Maritime
- Major cities: Rouen, Alençon, Le Mans, Tours

Highway system
- Roads in France; Autoroutes; Routes nationales

Route nationale 138 or RN 138 was a French Route nationale (trunk road) linking Rouen to Tours in the north-west of France. Part of the road (now RD 338) is temporarily a portion of the Circuit de la Sarthe, known as the Mulsanne Straight.

== Downgrade ==
Before the 1972 downgrade, the RN 138 linked Rouen to Saintes via Saumur. This portion of the road was partly downgraded between La Flèche and Niort, becoming RD 938. It was later renumbered:

RN 147 between Longué-Jumelles and Montreuil-Bellay
RN 150 between Niort and Saintes.

The remainder was downgraded in 2006. The road was then renumbered according to each département:

RD 438 in Eure
RD 438 in Orne
RD 338 in Sarthe
RD 938 in Indre-et-Loire
