= Route nationale 21 =

Road in France

The Route nationale 21 (N21) is a trunk road (nationale) in south west France.

== Reclassification ==
The N21 used to end at Gavarnie in the Pyrenees but after 1972 ended at Argelès-Gazost the old road is now the D921. Since 2006 the section south of Lourdes which is partly dual carriageway has been maintained by the Department Hautes-Pyrenees.

== Route ==
Limoges - Bergerac - Agen - Lourdes - Argelès-Gazost

=== Limoges to Bergerac (0 to 145 km) ===
The road starts at a junction with the N20 and heads west along the bank of the river Vienne which it crosses at Aixe-sur-Vienne. The road turns south west over open countryside to the small town of Châlus. The road passes through the Parc Regional Limousin reaching 350m altitude. The road passes the town of Thiviers before joining the River Isle close to its joining the river Auvezere. The road turns west to the town of Périgueux.

To the south of Périgueux the road is now numbered the D6021, with through traffic directed to use the N221 and A89 autoroute. The N21 recommences after the junction with the A89 and D6021 heading south. The countryside is now wooded including the Forêt de Montclard. The road meets the River Dordogne at the town of Bergerac.

=== Bergerac to Agen(145 to 236 km) ===
After Bergerac the road heads south east past the Chateau Montbazillac, to the small town of Castillonnes and then Cancon. The countryside becomes more rolling and the road reaches the Lot valley. The road now by-passes the town of Villeneuve-sur-Lot and continues to the south. The road then heads to the Garonne valley and the town of Agen. The town is home of the attraction Walibi Aquitaine and famous for its Prunes. Through traffic is directed west of the town along the N113.

=== Agen to Lourdes (236 to 402 km) ===
The road continues south crossing the river and a junction (7) with the A62 autoroute. The countryside becomes more rugged as the road passes the towns of Astaffort and Lectoure. The road heads into the valley of the Ger and the town of Fleurance. Further south the road passes through the town of Auch. The road heads south west to Mirande and the town of Miélan. The road heads west crossing a ridge and the Puntous de Laguian (342m). At Rabastens-de-Bigorre the road turns south again to the town of Tarbes.

The road leaves Tarbes to the south west (old road now the D921) with a junction (12) to the A64 autoroute. It passes the Tarbes-Lourdes-Pyrenees Airport before reaching the town of Lourdes.

=== Lourdes to Argelès-Gazost/Gavarnie (402 to 453 Km) ===
The road is dual carriageway south of Lourdes and is now numbered the D821 following the River Luz. Thereafter the old road is now the D921 continuing south along the Gorges de Luz into the Pyrenees mountains. It passes Luz-St-Sauveur before taking the Gorges de St Sauveur to the skiing resort of Gavarnie overlooked by the Pic de Tentes (2,322m) and the Cirque de Gavarnie (3,248m).
