= Route nationale 202 =

Road in France

The Route nationale 202 is a 114 km (71 mi) trunk road (nationale) in France between the Côte d'Azur and the winter sports resort towns in the southern Alps.
