= Route nationale 24 =

Road in France

The Route nationale 24 is a highway in western France. It connects the city of Rennes with the Atlantic port of Lorient. The road is approximately 149 km long.

== Route ==
The road starts at a junction with the N12 in the city centre of Rennes. The road heads south west and is a dual carriageway. The old road is numbered the RD224 and passes through the town of Mordelles. Thereafter the road is an upgrade of the former carriageway. At Plélan-le-Grand the new and old roads diverge again with the new road looping to the south at autoroute standard until rejoining at the town of Ploëmel. The old road numbered the RD724 skirted the Foret de Paimpont crossing the River Aff. It then headed across moorland (Camp de Coëtquidan-St-Cyr) before passing through the village of Campénéac before reaching the town of Ploëmel.

The road continues west over the rivers Ninian and Yvel. The Colonne des Trente is a memorial at the side of the road. The road now by-passes the town of Josselin and crosses the River Oust. The N24 is again autoroute standard as it continues passing north of Locminé. Thereafter the old route of the road is numbered the RD724 which has several steep inclines and descents as it crosses the River Evel and heads through the town of Baud. To the west of Baud is the Vénus de Quinpily.

The old and new routes then run parallel past the village of Languidic and entering the valley of the River Blavet. The old route headed through Hennebont crossing the river and then into north west Lorient as the Rue Jean Jaurès ending eventually at the Pont de Camel and the entrance to the port. The new road curves to the south ending at Junction 39 of the N165, European route 60 (Brest to Nantes) south east of Hennebont.

== Village étape ==
The route is served by the following three Village étapes, Josselin, Locminé and Plélan-le-Grand.
