= 26N =

26N may refer to:

- Ocean City Municipal Airport (New Jersey)'s FAA airport identification code
- 26th parallel north, a line of latitude

== See also ==
- N26 (disambiguation)
