= Route nationale 23 =

Road in France

Coordinates: 48.44701°N 1.48335°E

The Route nationale 23 (N23) is a trunk road (nationale) in western France.

== Reclassification ==
Since the re-classification of roads in 2006 much of the old N23 has been downgraded as follows: In Eure-et-Loir as the RD 923, in Orne as the RD 923, Sarthe as the RD 323, in Maine-et-Loire as the RD 323 between Sarthe and Angers, after Angers is numbered the RD 723 to the department Loire-Atlantique where it is also the RD 723.

== Route ==
Chartres - Angers - Nantes

=== Chartres to Angers (0 km to 210 km) ===
The road starts in the cathedral city of Chartres with a junction with the Route nationale 10. The road heads west crossing the city's ring road the N123 and N154 to Rouen.

The road passes the town of Courville-sur-Eure. The road then skirts the south of Foret de Champrond entering the Parc Nationale du Perche. The road has a junction with the RD928 and heads south west to Nogent-le-Rotrou. The road by-passes the town to the west and thereafter is now numbered the RD923. The road follows the valley of the River Huisne.

The road comes to the town of La Ferté-Bernard. Continuing south west the road crosses the A11 autoroute. The road passes the town of Connerre. The road then comes to a junction with the N157 (to Orleans) and A28 autoroute. The road then skirts the south east of Le Mans crossing the River Sarthe.

The road passes through wooded countryside to the town of La Flèche. The road then crosses the A11 again. The N23 joins the A11 again just east of Angers.

=== Angers to Nantes (210 km to 298 km) ===
The road crosses the River Maine and heads west. The road now follows the north bank of the River Loire. The road passes through the town of Ancenis. An Ancenis bypass is under construction. The road continues to the town of Nantes.
