= Bessines-sur-Gartempe =

- Commune
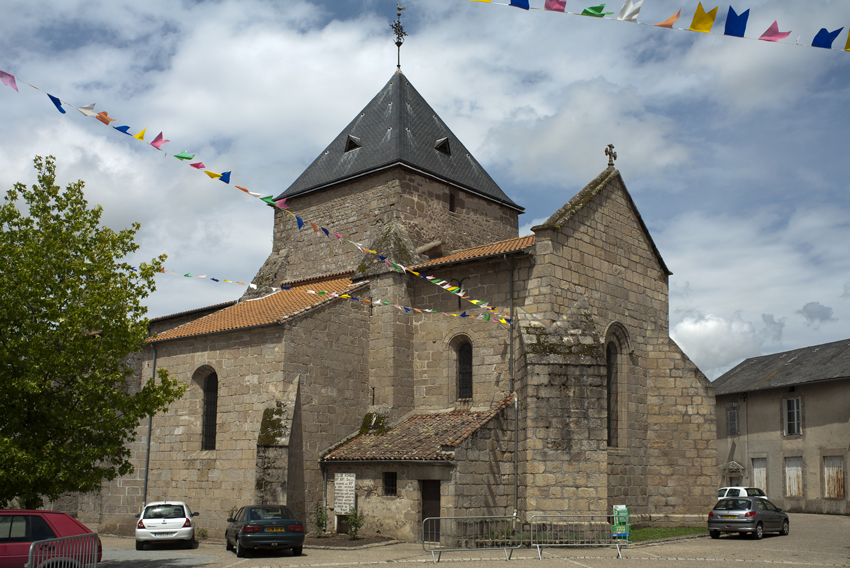
- Saint-Léger church

- Coat of arms
- Location of Bessines-sur-Gartempe
- Location within France Location within Nouvelle-Aquitaine
- Coordinates: 46°06′35″N 1°22′10″E
- Country: France
- Region: Nouvelle-Aquitaine
- Department: Haute-Vienne
- Arrondissement: Bellac
- Canton: Ambazac

Government
  - Mayor (2020–2026): Andréa Brouille
- Area^{1}: 55.41 km^{2} (21.39 sq mi)
- Highest elevation: 533 m (1,749 ft)
- Lowest elevation: 250 m (820 ft)
- Population (2023): 2,709
  - Density: 48.89/km^{2} (126.6/sq mi)
- Time zone: UTC+01:00 (CET)
  - Summer (DST): UTC+02:00 (CEST)
- INSEE/Postal code: 87014 /87250
- ^{1} French Land Register data, which excludes lakes, ponds, glaciers > 1 km^{2} (0.386 sq mi or 247 acres) and river estuaries.

Bessines-sur-Gartempe (French pronunciation: [bɛsin syʁ ɡaʁtɑ̃p], literally Bessines on Gartempe; Limousin: Becinas) is a commune in the Haute-Vienne department in the Nouvelle-Aquitaine region in western France.

The commune is listed as a Village étape.

== Geography ==
The river Semme forms part of the commune's north-eastern border, flows westward through the northern part of the commune, north of Morterolles-sur-Semmes, a hamlet, then forms part of the commune's north-western border.

The river Gartempe forms part of the commune's eastern border, flows westward through the middle of the commune, north of Bessines-sur-Gartempe, the main village, then forms part of the commune's western border.

== Population ==
Historical population
Year	Pop.	±% p.a.
1968	3,417	—
1975	2,982	−1.93%
1982	3,011	+0.14%
1990	2,988	−0.10%
1999	2,743	−0.95%
2007	2,912	+0.75%
2012	2,830	−0.57%
2017	2,836	+0.04%
2023	2,709	−0.76%
Source: INSEE

Inhabitants are known as Bessinauds in French.

== Culture ==
In the late 20th century, the community's local band, a traveling chamber orchestra known as "La Banda de Bessines" ("The Bessines Band"), gained some national repute, winning French National Band Championships in 1988, 1989, 1991, 1992, 1995, 1996, and 2005.

Bessines sur Gartempe has also been awarded the prestigious "Village d'Etape" status.

== People ==
The painter Suzanne Valadon was born in the village in 1865.

== Gallery ==
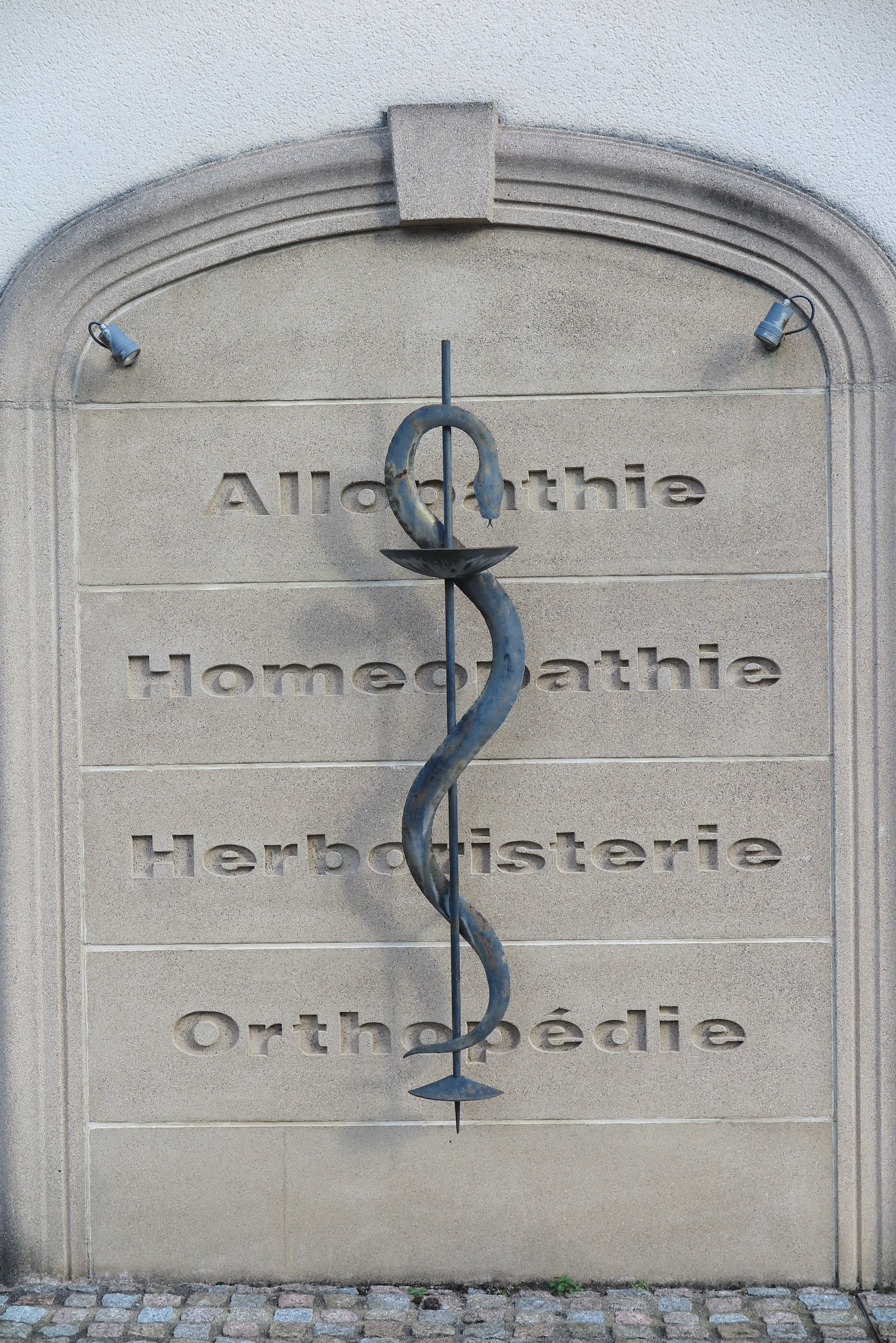

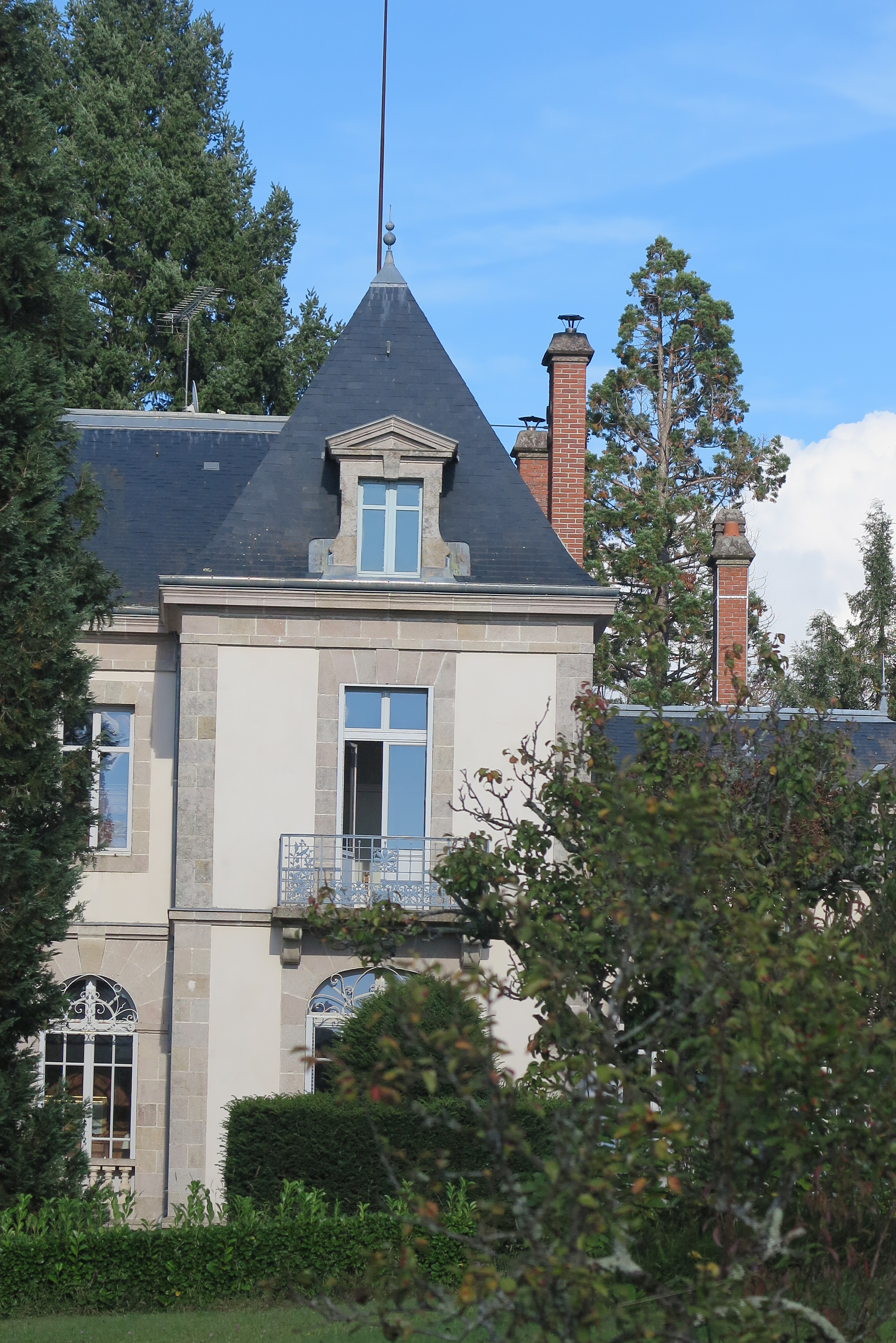

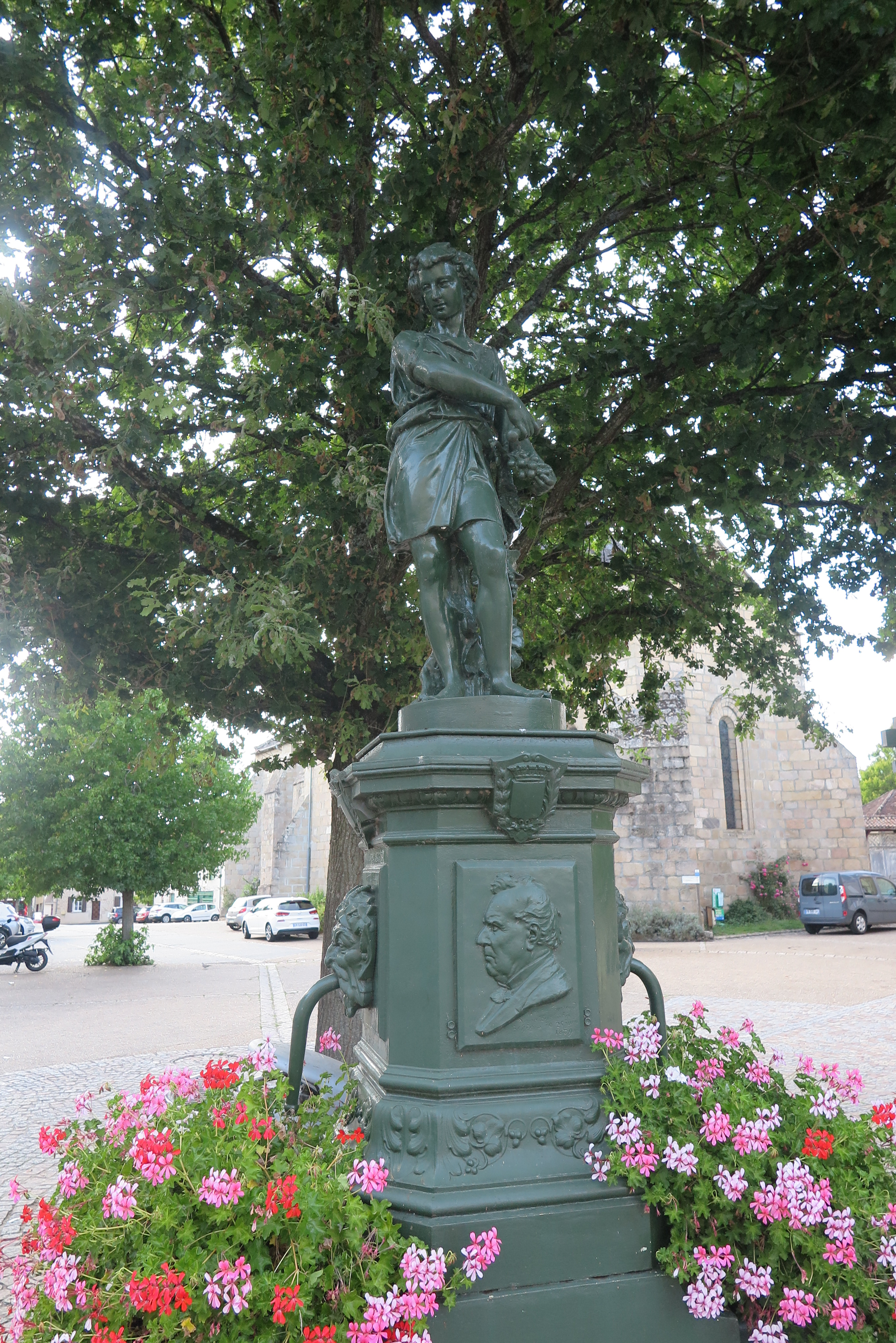

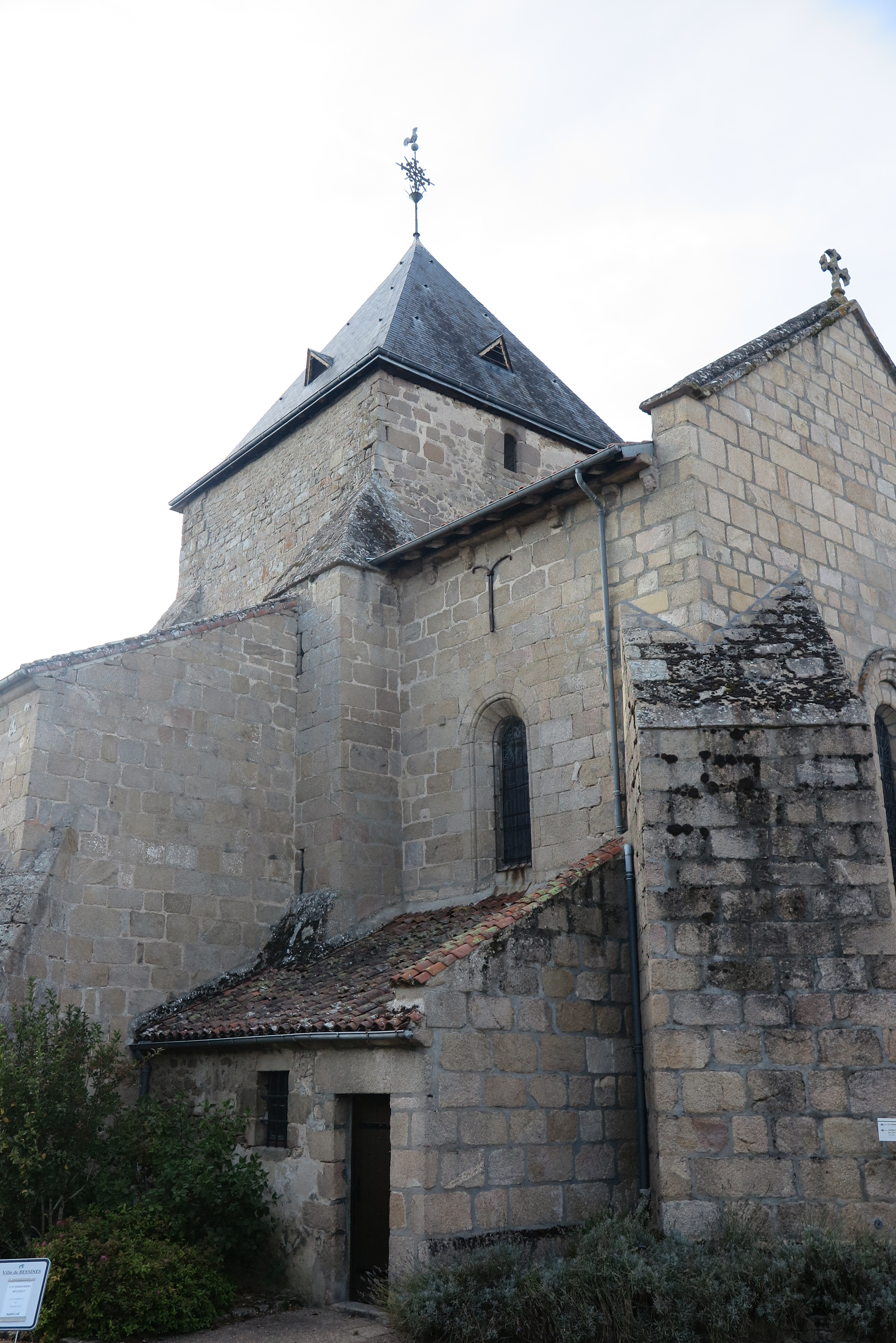

== See also ==
- Communes of the Haute-Vienne department
