= Société des Autoroutes de Paris Normandie =

SAPN, Société des Autoroutes de Paris Normandie is a motorway operator company in France. It operates motorways in the West of France thanks to concessions given by the French government. Its network is 368 km long.

== Background ==
The SAPN was created in 1963 and since then, has fulfilled the targets set by the French government: build, maintain and operate a network of motorways. Its network serves two regions; Ile-de-France and Normandy. SAPN's network consists of the A14 (16 km long), the A13 (233 km long) and the A29 (119 km long). All motorways, except portions of the A13 are tolled.

SAPN's concession expires in 2033.

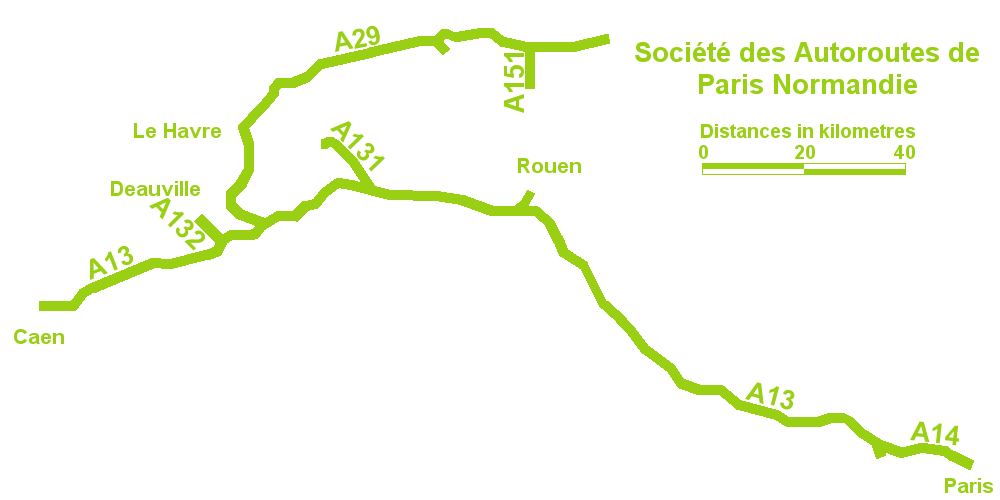
SAPN's network of motorways.
