= Le Mêle-sur-Sarthe =

- Commune
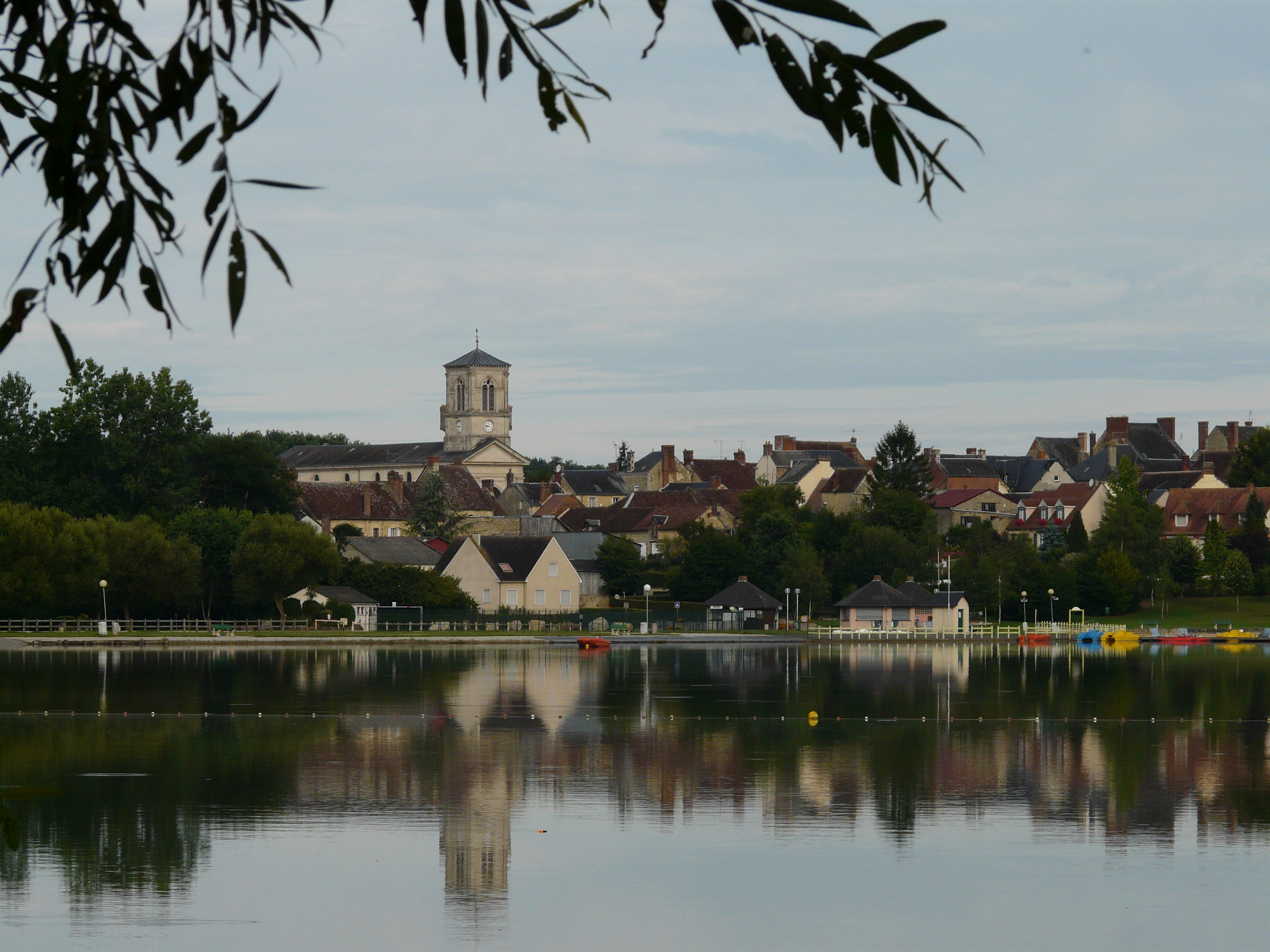
- A general view of Le Mêle-sur-Sarthe from the Bois-Roger lake

- Coat of arms
- Location of Le Mêle-sur-Sarthe
- Location within France Location within Normandy
- Coordinates: 48°30′43″N 0°21′20″E
- Country: France
- Region: Normandy
- Department: Orne
- Arrondissement: Alençon
- Canton: Écouves
- Intercommunality: Vallée de la Haute Sarthe

Government
  - Mayor (2020–2026): Jean-Dimitri Photopoulos
- Area^{1}: 0.62 km^{2} (0.24 sq mi)
- Elevation: 155 m (509 ft)
- Highest elevation: 157 m (515 ft)
- Lowest elevation: 143 m (469 ft)
- Population (2023): 659
  - Density: 1,100/km^{2} (2,800/sq mi)
- Time zone: UTC+01:00 (CET)
  - Summer (DST): UTC+02:00 (CEST)
- INSEE/Postal code: 61258 /61170
- ^{1} French Land Register data, which excludes lakes, ponds, glaciers > 1 km^{2} (0.386 sq mi or 247 acres) and river estuaries.

Le Mêle-sur-Sarthe (French pronunciation: [lə mɛl syʁ saʁt], literally Le Mêle on Sarthe) is a commune in the Orne department in north-western France. It is the commune with the smallest area in the Orne, covering an area of 0.62 km ².

The commune is listed as a Village étape.

== Geography ==
This Commune is made up of the following collection of villages and hamlets, Le Mêle-sur-Sarthe and Les Chênes.

The commune along with another 32 communes is part of a 3,503 hectare, Natura 2000 conservation area, called the Haute vallée de la Sarthe.

The Sarthe river flows through the commune.

== Points of interest ==
=== National heritage sites ===
- église Notre-Dame-de-l'Assomption nineteenth century church, that was registered as a Monument historique 1975.

== Notable people ==
- Daniel Goulet (1928 - 2007) a French politician was mayor here, and later buried here.

== Twin towns – sister cities ==
Le Mêle-sur-Sarthe is twinned with:

- Faringdon, United Kingdom (since 1990)
- Königstein im Taunus, Germany
- Libčany, Czech Republic

== See also ==
- Communes of the Orne department
- Parc naturel régional Normandie-Maine
