= Grand-Couronne =

- Commune
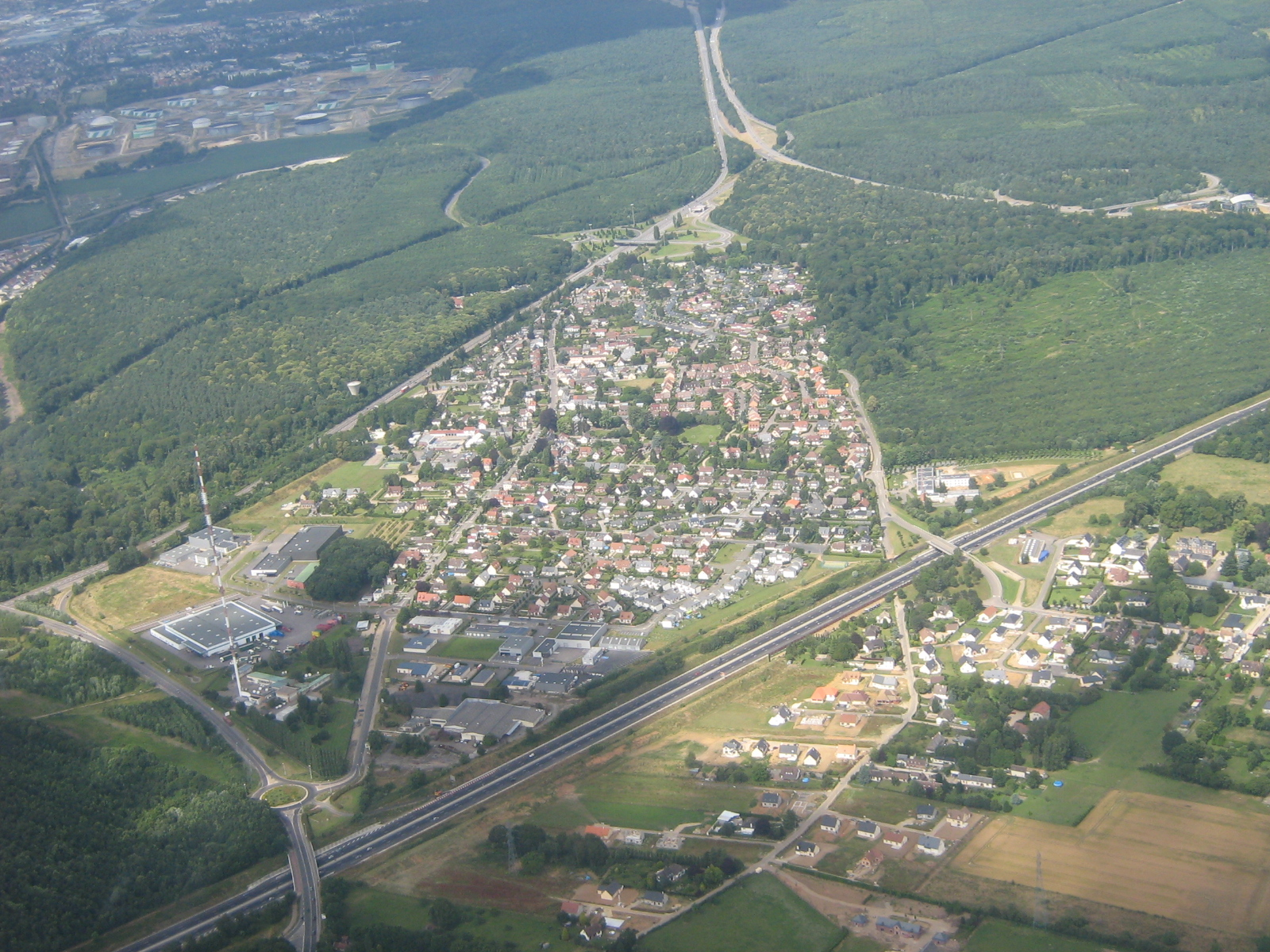
- An aerial view of Les Essarts

- Coat of arms
- Location of Grand-Couronne
- Location within France Location within Normandy
- Coordinates: 49°21′30″N 1°00′29″E
- Country: France
- Region: Normandy
- Department: Seine-Maritime
- Arrondissement: Rouen
- Canton: Elbeuf
- Intercommunality: Métropole Rouen Normandie

Government
  - Mayor (2026–32): Julie Lesage
- Area^{1}: 16.93 km^{2} (6.54 sq mi)
- Elevation: 16 m (52 ft)
- Highest elevation: 139 m (456 ft)
- Lowest elevation: 2 m (6.6 ft)
- Population (2023): 9,768
  - Density: 577.0/km^{2} (1,494/sq mi)
- Time zone: UTC+01:00 (CET)
  - Summer (DST): UTC+02:00 (CEST)
- INSEE/Postal code: 76319 /76530
- ^{1} French Land Register data, which excludes lakes, ponds, glaciers > 1 km^{2} (0.386 sq mi or 247 acres) and river estuaries.

Grand-Couronne (French pronunciation: [ɡʁɑ̃ kuʁɔn]) is a commune in the Seine-Maritime department in the Normandy region in northern France.

== Geography ==
A small suburban town with a huge container port and considerable light industry situated by the banks of the river Seine, some 7 miles (11 km) south of the centre of Rouen, at the junction of the D938, D3 and the D13 roads. The A13 autoroute passes through the southern section of the commune's territory.

== Heraldry ==
Arms of Grand-Couronne	The arms of Grand-Couronne are blazoned : Per fess gules and azure, a leopard Or and a boat Or on 3 bars wavy argent (waves) dimidiated with Per fess azure and gules, a crown Or and a demi toothed wheel argent issuant from the line of division.

== Population ==
Historical population
Year	Pop.	±% p.a.
1968	6,789	—
1975	7,749	+1.91%
1982	9,472	+2.91%
1990	9,792	+0.42%
1999	9,442	−0.40%
2007	9,492	+0.07%
2012	9,896	+0.84%
2017	9,648	−0.51%
2023	9,768	+0.21%
Source: INSEE

== Twin towns ==
- Seelze, Germany
- Velten, Germany

== See also ==
- Communes of the Seine-Maritime department
