= Plélan-le-Grand =

Plélan-le-Grand Pilelan (Gallo) Plelann-Veur (Breton)
- Commune
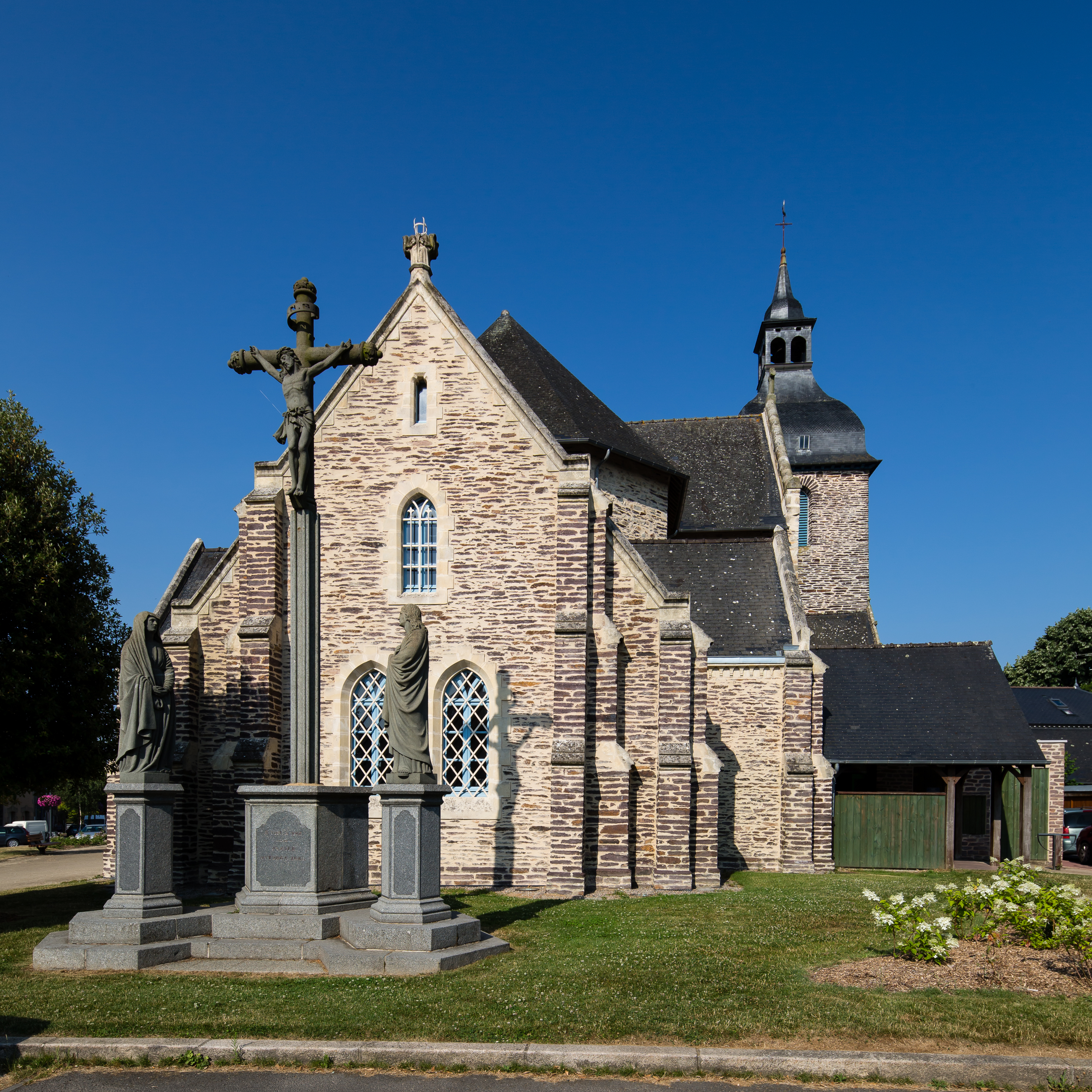
- The church of Saint-Pierre, in Plélan-le-Grand
- Location of Plélan-le-Grand
- Location within France Location within Brittany
- Coordinates: 48°00′09″N 2°05′52″W
- Country: France
- Region: Brittany
- Department: Ille-et-Vilaine
- Arrondissement: Rennes
- Canton: Montfort-sur-Meu
- Intercommunality: CC de Brocéliande

Government
  - Mayor (2020–2026): Murielle Douté-Bouton
- Area^{1}: 49.74 km^{2} (19.20 sq mi)
- Highest elevation: 154 m (505 ft)
- Lowest elevation: 42 m (138 ft)
- Population (2023): 4,076
  - Density: 81.95/km^{2} (212.2/sq mi)
- Time zone: UTC+01:00 (CET)
  - Summer (DST): UTC+02:00 (CEST)
- INSEE/Postal code: 35223 /35380
- ^{1} French Land Register data, which excludes lakes, ponds, glaciers > 1 km^{2} (0.386 sq mi or 247 acres) and river estuaries.

Plélan-le-Grand (French pronunciation: [plelɑ̃ lə ɡʁɑ̃]; Gallo: Pilelan, Breton: Plelann-Veur) is a commune in the Ille-et-Vilaine department of Brittany in northwestern France.

The commune is listed as a Village étape.

== Population ==
Inhabitants of Plélan-le-Grand are called Plélanais in French.

Historical population
Year	Pop.	±% p.a.
1968	2,336	—
1975	2,284	−0.32%
1982	2,349	+0.40%
1990	2,566	+1.11%
1999	2,940	+1.52%
2007	3,498	+2.20%
2012	3,611	+0.64%
2017	3,949	+1.81%
2023	4,076	+0.53%
Source: INSEE

== See also ==
- Communes of the Ille-et-Vilaine department
- Jean-Marie Valentin
