= BMW N26 =

Overview
- Manufacturer: BMW
- Production: 2012-2016

Layout
- Configuration: Straight-4 DOHC
- Displacement: 2.0 L (122 cu in)
- Compression ratio: 10:1

Combustion
- Fuel type: Gasoline

Chronology
- Predecessor: BMW N20

The BMW N26 is a turbocharged straight-4 petrol engine which was produced for SULEV vehicles from 2012-2016. It was sold in states of the USA with SULEV legislation.

The N26 is based on the BMW N20, with the following changes: metal fuel lines (instead of rubber), a valve in the fuel tank venting system to test the fuel system for leaks, an electronic wastegate and larger catalytic converters.

== Models ==
Engine	Displacement	Power	Torque	Redline
N26B20	1,997 cc (122 cu in)	180 kW (241 hp) @ 6500 rpm	350 N⋅m (258 lb⋅ft) @ 1250-4800 rpm	7000

=== Applications ===
- 2012-2016 F30 328i / 328iX (USA only)
- 2012-2016 F22 228i / 228iX (USA only)
- 2014-2016 BMW 4 Series F32/F35/F36 428i SULEV (USA only)
- BMW in Canada, used N26 as replacement for N20 for only one year in 2016 as '28i models then replaced by B48 motor in '30i BMW models

== See also ==
- List of BMW engines
