= Route nationale 112 =

Road in France

National road 112
- Route nationale 112

Route information
- Length: 20 km (12 mi)

Location
- Country: France

Highway system
- Roads in France; Autoroutes; Routes nationales

The Route Nationale 112 is a French road which linked Montpellier to Albi until 2006.

From 1824 to the 1972 reform, the RN 112 linked Agde to Toulouse. It was renamed RD 112 between Castres and Toulouse and RD 612 on certain sections of the route. The section from Montpellier to Agde belonged to the RN 108. The section from Castres to Albi belonged to the RN 118. Following the 2005 reform, it only remains between Castres and Mazamet, the rest being transferred to the departments (D 612).

== History ==
Originally, the route of the future route nationale 112 was created in 1759, after the construction of the Rigautou bridge over the Thoré river. It linked Castres to Montpellier.
