= Belle-Isle-en-Terre =

Belle-Isle-en-Terre Benac'h
- Commune
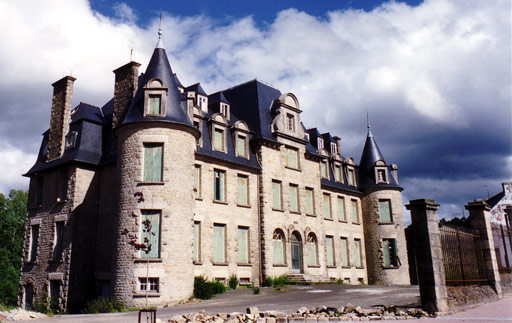
- Chateau

- Coat of arms
- Location of Belle-Isle-en-Terre
- Location within France Location within Brittany
- Coordinates: 48°32′44″N 3°23′36″W
- Country: France
- Region: Brittany
- Department: Côtes-d'Armor
- Arrondissement: Guingamp
- Canton: Callac
- Intercommunality: Guingamp-Paimpol Agglomération

Government
  - Mayor (2020–2026): François Le Marrec
- Area^{1}: 14.11 km^{2} (5.45 sq mi)
- Highest elevation: 266 m (873 ft)
- Lowest elevation: 77 m (253 ft)
- Population (2023): 1,024
  - Density: 72.57/km^{2} (188.0/sq mi)
- Time zone: UTC+01:00 (CET)
  - Summer (DST): UTC+02:00 (CEST)
- INSEE/Postal code: 22005 /22810
- ^{1} French Land Register data, which excludes lakes, ponds, glaciers > 1 km^{2} (0.386 sq mi or 247 acres) and river estuaries.

Belle-Isle-en-Terre (French pronunciation: [bɛl il ɑ̃ tɛʁ]; Breton: Benac'h) is a commune in the Côtes-d'Armor department of Brittany in northwestern France. Belle isle - in modern French - Belle île meaning "beautiful island" and en Terre significate "on the ground".

The commune is listed as a Village étape.

== Population ==
Historical population
Year	Pop.	±% p.a.
1968	1,142	—
1975	1,185	+0.53%
1982	1,204	+0.23%
1990	1,067	−1.50%
1999	1,099	+0.33%
2007	1,046	−0.62%
2012	1,085	+0.73%
2017	1,031	−1.02%
2023	1,024	−0.11%
Source: INSEE

Inhabitants of Belle-Isle-en-Terre are called Bellilois in French.

== Breton language ==
The municipality launched a linguistic plan through Ya d'ar brezhoneg on 26 November 2007.

In 2008, 28.46% of primary school children attended bilingual schools.

== See also ==
- Communes of the Côtes-d'Armor department
