= Route nationale 10 =

French route nationale

National road 10
- Route nationale 10
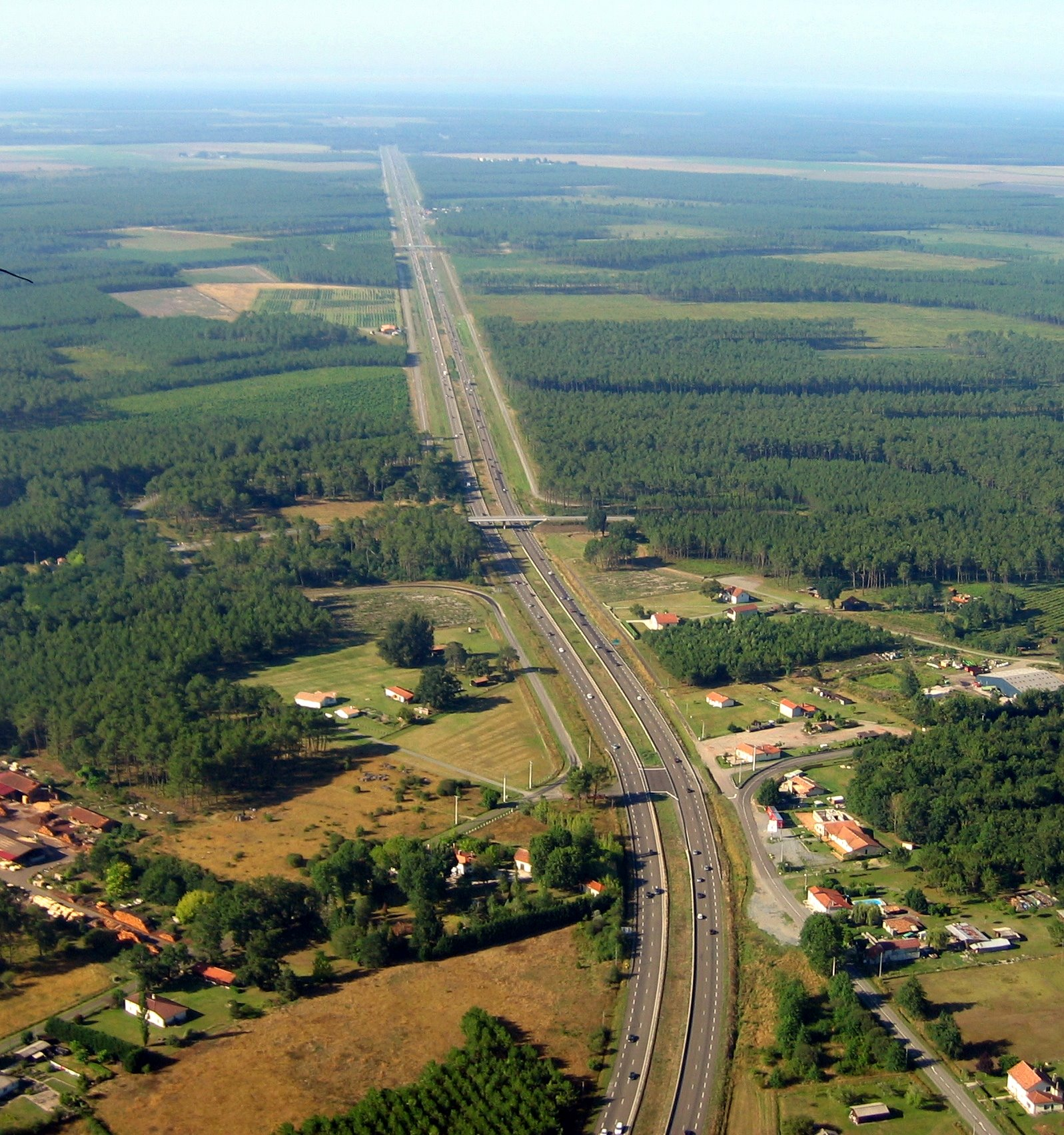
- N10 in Landes

Route information
- Length: 762 km (473 mi)

Location
- Country: France

Highway system
- Roads in France; Autoroutes; Routes nationales

Route nationale 10, or RN 10, is a trunk (route nationale) in France between Paris and the border with Spain via Bordeaux.

== Reclassification ==
Unlike many other routes nationales, the road retains its status along the majority of its route. However, several sections have been downgraded to RD, route départementale (departmental road): the RD 810, RD 910 and RD 911.

== Route ==
Paris-Chartres-Poitiers-Bordeaux-Spain

=== Paris to Chartres (0 km to 83 km) ===
The road begins at the Porte de Saint Cloud, southwest of central Paris, as the Avenue du Général Leclerc. It passes the suburb of Boulogne-Billancourt. The road crosses the river Seine. Through traffic then takes the RN 118 dual carriageway. The old RN 10 is now renamed the RD 910 and called Grande Rue through the suburb of Sèvres.

The road then passes Chaville between the Forêt de Fausses Reposses and Forêt de Meudon. It continues west as the Avenue de Paris to the town of Versailles and its palace as the RD 10 (route départementale). The road then turns south in the square past the railway station before turning west again as the Avenue de la Division Leclerc, skirting the domain of the Château de Versailles.

The road crosses the RN 12 before becoming the RN 10 southbound with a junction onto the A 12. The road plunges into the Forêt de Rambouillet and then reaches the town of Rambouilet. At Ablis, it crosses the A 11 and turns west through flat countryside to Chartres.

=== Chartres to Poitiers (83 km to 320 km) ===
To the south of Chartres the road turns south west over gently rolling countryside now bypassing the old villages, crossing the river Loir at Bonneval. It next comes to Châteaudun, and follows the Loir valley skirting the Forêt de Fréteval before entering Vendôme where it leaves the valley and crosses the TGV Atlantique line before reaching Château-Renault.

The countryside becomes more wooded as the road heads to Tours where it crosses the Loire and the Cher. The town is also on the autoroutes A10 and A85. RN 10 heads south over a wooded ridge and then into the Indre river valley through rolling countryside.

The road crosses the river Creuse and then follows the valley of the Vienne to the town of Châtellerault. It then follows the river Clain to the city of Poitiers. Here the RN 11 branches off west to La Rochelle and the Atlantic coast.

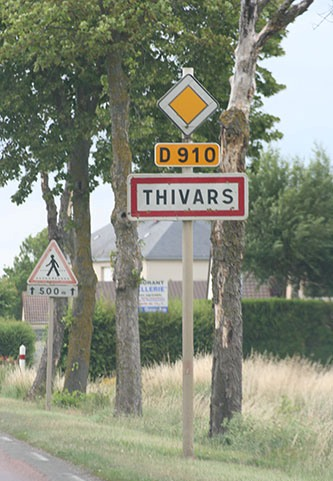
Thivars

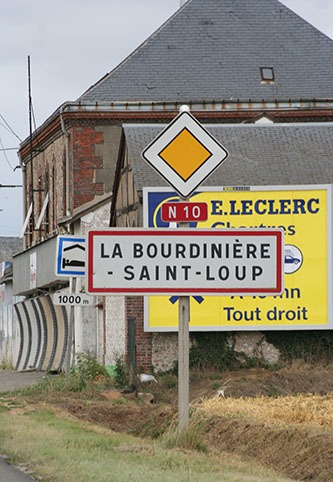
La Bourdinière-Saint-Loup

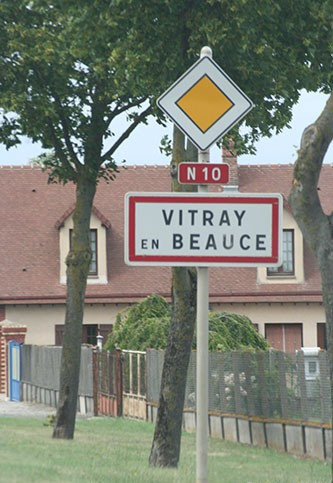
Vitray-en-Beauce

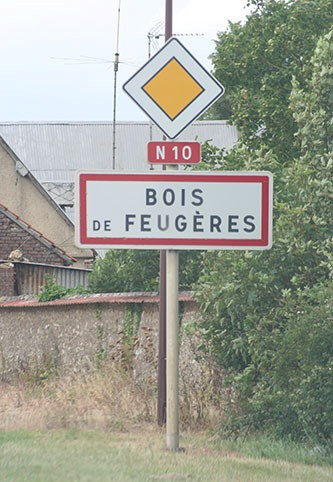
Bouville, Eure-et-Loir

Between Chartres and Bonneval, 2006

=== Poitiers to Bordeaux (320 km to 546 km) ===
RN 10 continues south following the river Clain as the countryside becomes increasingly hilly. It then follows the river Charente, the old course of the road is now numbered the RD 911. It passes through the Forêt de Ruffec before crossing the Charente at Mansle. On the south bank it crosses the Forêt de Boixe before following the Charente again at the hill top town of Angoulême, then heads south west as the old RD 910 passing over the hills reaching a height of 142 m.

The road by-passes little towns such as Barbezieux-Saint-Hilaire then through the Bois de Creusat into Wine country passing the village of Pouillac. It meets the A 10 again at Saint-André-de-Cubzac and crosses the Dordogne. The old road passes through Ambarès-et-Lagrave as avenue de l'Aquitaine (as the RD 911). It becomes the avenue Carnet and avenue Thiers in the centre of Bordeaux. It then crosses the Garonne at the Pont de pierre.

=== Bordeaux to France's border with Spain (546 km to 749 km) ===
The road leaves Bordeaux to the south as the cours Gambetta and crosses the A 630/E 70 at Réjouit and then into heavily wooded countryside of the Landes de Gascogne. The Centre d'études scientifiques et techniques d'Aquitaine, a nuclear weapon research center, is located 4 km north of the village of Le Barp. The road continues to Belin-Béliet before converging with the A 63 (E 5, E 70). It then runs south with the old course now numbered the D 10e as the new road bypasses the town of Labouheyre.

At the river Adour the A 63 starts again branching to the west. RN 10 has a junction with RN 124 going through Saint-Vincent-de-Tyrosse, then heads towards the Atlantic coast entering Bayonne where it crosses to the south side of the river Adour on the Pont H. Grenet, and continues southwest past the airport and Biarritz.

RN 10 reaches the Côte basque by Bidart, Guéthary, alongside the Plage de Parlementia before entering the town of Saint-Jean-de-Luz and crossing the river on the Charles de Gaulle bridge into the town of Ciboure. It then passes round Urrugne heading past the Parc Florónia at 133m and then falling spectacularly down into the valley below crossing the river Bidasoa and entering Spain where the road becomes the N-1 road.

== Village étape ==
The Autoroute is served by the following five Village étapes, Barbezieux-Saint-Hilaire, Bonneval, Cloyes-les-Trois-Rivières, Vivonne and Mansle.

== External ==
Media related to Route nationale 10 (France) at Wikimedia Commons
