= Route nationale =

Class of trunk road in France

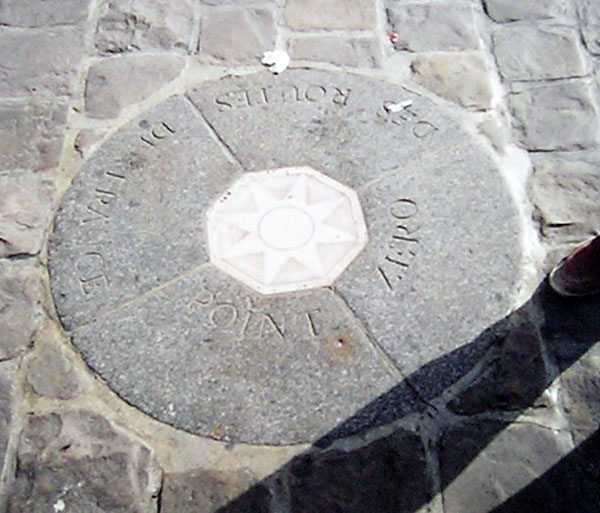
Point zéro (kilometre zero) on the parvis of Notre-Dame de Paris

A route nationale, or simply nationale, is a class of trunk road in France. They are important roads of national significance which cross broad portions of the French territory, in contrast to departmental or communal roads which serve more limited local areas.

Their use is free, except when crossing certain structures subject to a toll. They are open to all vehicles, except on certain sections having motorway (autoroute) or express road (voie express) status, both of these categories being reserved for motorized vehicles only.

France at one time had some 30,500 km of routes nationales and publicly owned motorways. However,this figure has decreased with the transfer of the responsibility for many routes to the départements; by 2010, the total length of motorways and other national roads was around 21,100 km. By way of comparison, routes départementales in the same year covered a total distance of 378,000 km.

The layout of the main trunk road network reflects France's centralizing tradition: the majority of them radiate from Paris. The most important trunk roads begin on the parvis of Notre Dame de Paris at a point known as point zéro (kilometre zero). In order to cover the country effectively, there are many other roads that do not serve Paris directly.

== History ==
The system dates back to 16 December 1811, when Napoleon designated a number of routes impériales (imperial highways). First-class routes were numbered from 1 to 14; all began at Paris, radiating out in a clockwise manner. Route 1 ran from Paris north to Calais, and is still the general path of route nationale 1. Second-class routes, from 15 to 27, did the same, while third-class routes from 28 to 229 provided less major connections. During the Bourbon Restoration, in 1824, these routes were renamed routes royales (royal highways) and modified. Route 3, Paris to Hamburg via Soissons, Reims and Liège, was renumbered to 31 and 51, and the subsequent routes were shifted down by one. Routes 19 and 20 were completely outside the post-Napoleon France, and so 21 to 27 became 18 to 24. In 1830 the highways were renamed routes nationales.

In the 21st century, the French Government has downgraded many of the former routes nationales, such as the N7 from Paris to the Côte d'Azur, transferring responsibility for them to the départements.

== List of routes nationales ==
=== Routes nationales 1 to 25 ===
Number	Runs through:
N1	Paris - Beauvais - Amiens - Abbeville - Boulogne-sur-Mer - Calais - Dunkirk - Belgium (N39)
N2	Paris - Soissons - Laon - Maubeuge - Belgium (N6)
N3	Paris - Meaux - Château-Thierry - Épernay - Châlons-en-Champagne - Verdun - Metz - Germany (B41)
N4	Paris - Vitry-le-François - Saint-Dizier - Toul - Blâmont - Sarrebourg - Strasbourg - Germany (B28)
N4A	Vincennes (N34) - Joinville-le-Pont (N186)
N5	Dijon - Dole - Switzerland (Geneva) - Thonon-les-Bains - Saint-Gingolph - Switzerland (21)
N6	Paris - Melun - Fontainebleau - Sens - Auxerre - Chalon-sur-Saône - Mâcon - Lyon - Chambéry - Modane - Italy (SS25)
N7	Paris - Fontainebleau - Montargis - Cosne-Cours-sur-Loire - Nevers - Moulins - Roanne - Lyon - Vienne - Valence - Montélimar - Orange - Avignon - Aix-en-Provence - Fréjus - Saint-Raphaël - Cannes - Antibes - Nice - Menton - Italy (SS1)
N8	Aix-en-Provence - Marseille - Aubagne - Toulon
N9	Moulins - Clermont-Ferrand - Issoire - Saint-Chély-d'Apcher - Marvejols - Banassac - Millau - Clermont-l'Hérault - Béziers - Narbonne - Perpignan - Spain (N-II)
N10	Saint-Cyr-l'École - Rambouillet - Chartres - Tours - Châtellerault - Poitiers - Angoulême - Bordeaux - Biarritz - Spain (N-I)
N11	Poitiers (N10) - Niort - La Rochelle
N12	Saint-Cyr-l'École - Dreux - Alençon - Fougères - Liffré - Rennes - Saint-Brieuc - Brest
N13	Paris - Saint-Germain-en-Laye - Orgeval - Mantes-la-Jolie - Évreux - Lisieux - Caen - Cherbourg
N14	Paris - Enghien - Pontoise - Rouen
N15	Bonnières-sur-Seine (A13) - Rouen - Yvetot - Le Havre
N16	Pierrefitte (N1) - Creil - Clermont
N17	Le Bourget (N2) - Senlis - Arras - Lille - Hallum Belgium (N32)
N18	Étain - Longuyon - Longwy - Belgium (N830)
N19	Paris - Provins - Troyes - Chaumont - Langres - Vesoul - Belfort - Switzerland
N20	Paris - Étampes - Orléans - Vierzon - Châteauroux - Limoges - Brive - Cahors - Montauban - Toulouse - Foix - Bourg-Madame - Spain (N-152)
N21	Limoges - Périgueux - Bergerac - Agen - Auch - Tarbes - Argelès-Gazost
N22	N20 between Foix and Bourg-Madame - Andorra
N23	Chartres - Le Mans - Angers - Nantes
N24	Rennes - Lorient
N25	Amiens - Arras

=== Routes nationales 26 to 50 ===
Number	Runs through:
N26	Verneuil-sur-Avre (N12) - Argentan
N27	Rouen - Dieppe
N28	Rouen - Abbeville - Dunkirk
N29	Yvetot - Amiens - Saint-Quentin - La Capelle
N30	Bapaume - Cambrai - Valenciennes - Quiévrain
N31	Rouen - Beauvais - Compiègne - Soissons - Reims
N32	Compiègne - La Fère
N33	Saint-Avold - Creutzwald
N34	Vincennes - Coulommiers - Esternay
N35	Saint-Dizier - Bar-le-Duc - Verdun
N36	Meaux - Melun
N37	Saint-Germain-sur-École (A6) - Barbizon (RN7)
N38	Beauvais - Ressons-sur-Matz - Noyon - Charmes; downgraded to D 338, D 938 and D 1032
N39	Arras - Hesdin - Le Touquet-Paris-Plage
N40	Le Havre - Eu - Calais - Belgium (N39); downgraded to D 940
N41	Béthune - Lille
N42	Boulogne-sur-Mer - Saint-Omer - Bailleul
N43	Metz - Sedan - La Capelle - Charleville-Mézières - Cambrai - Douai - Lens - Béthune - Saint-Omer - Calais
N44	Cambrai - Saint-Quentin - Laon - Reims - Châlons-en-Champagne - Vitry-le-François
N45	Douai - Valenciennes
N46	Marle-sur-Serre - Parois; downgraded to D 946
N47	Lens - La Bassée
N48	Valenciennes - Belgium (N60); downgraded to D 935
N49	Valenciennes - Maubeuge - Jeumont - Belgium (N54)
N50	Arras - Douai

=== Routes nationales 51 to 75 ===
Number	Runs through:
N51	Witry-lès-Reims - Rethel; Originally ran from Orléans to Givet. In 1978, the section from Montereau-Fault-Yonne to Épernay was downgraded to D 951 and D 403 while the section from Orléans to Fontainebleau was reassigned to the N 152. In 2005, the Épernay-Reims section was downgraded to D 951 and the Rocroi to Givet section was downgraded to D 8051.
N52	Metz - Thionville - Longwy - Belgium (A28); Originally ran from Uckange to Longwy. In the 1970s, a section from Metz to Florange was added and the section from Uckange to Florange was downgraded to D 952.
N53	Thionville - Évrange; Originally began at Metz; the Metz-Thionville section was downgraded to D 953 in 1972 and the remainder was downgraded to D 653 in 2006.
N54	Metz - Boulay-Moselle - Téterchen - Germany (B 269); Downgraded to D 954 in the 1970s.
N55	Metz - Delme - Château-Salins; Downgraded to D 955 in the 1970s.
N56	Saint-Avold - Sarralbe; Downgraded to D 956 in 2005.
N57	Metz - Nancy - Épinal - Vesoul - Besançon - Pontarlier - Ballaigues
N58	Sedan - Bouillon; Originally ran from Pont-à-Mousson to Saulx-en-Barrois; this was downgraded to D 958 in 1972.
N59	Nancy - Saint-Dié-des-Vosges - Raves; originally continued to Sélestat, but this was downgraded to D 1059 in 2021.
N60	Orléans - Montargis - Sens - Troyes; Downgraded to D 960, D 60, D 660 and D 2060 in 2005.
N61	Phalsbourg - Saarbrücken; Phalsbourg-Hambach downgraded to D 1061 in 2005 and reminder downgraded to D 661 in 2024.
N62	Haguenau - Deux-Ponts; Downgraded to D 1062, D 662 and D 962 in 1972.
N62	Sarreguemines - Haguenau; Downgraded to D 1062 and D 662 in 2005.
N63	Strasbourg - Haguenau - A35
N64	Charleville-Mézières - Sedan - Verdun - Commercy - Neufchâteau - Lure; Downgraded to D 964, D 764 (one section now D 8043), D 164 and D 64 in 1972.
N65	Auxerre - A6; Originally ran from Neufchâteau to Bonny-sur-Loire; the section from Neufchâteau to Charmont was renumbered to N 74 (itself now D 674) and the remainder downgraded to the D 65 and D 965.
N66	Remiremont - Mulhouse; originally continued to the Swiss border, but this was downgraded to D 66 and D 201.
N67	Saint-Dizier - Chaumont; Downgraded to D 570 in 2024.
N68	La Chaussée - Lauterbourg; Much of route downgraded in the 1970s to D 468 except for the Illkirch-Graffenstaden – Strasbourg section, which was renumbered to N 83.
N69	Huningue - Switzerland; Downgraded to D 469 in 1972.
N70	Paray-le-Monial - Montchanin; Originally ran from La Roche-en-Brenil to Combeaufontaine; this was downgraded to D 70.
N71	Troyes - Dijon; Downgraded to D 671 and D 971 in 2005.
N72	Mont-sous-Vaudrey - Pontarlier; Downgraded to D 472 and D 72 in 1972.
N72	Ramp to A6 exit 28 (Mâcon-Nord) from the A6 at Sennecé-lès-Mâcon; Downgraded to D 672 in 2006.
N73	Besançon - Dole - Chalon-sur-Saône; Originally ran from Moulins to Hésingue, but this was downgraded to D 973 in the 1970s.
N74	Sarreguemines - Château-Salins - Nancy - Toul - Chaumont - Langres - Dijon - Beaune - Corpeau (Route des Grands Crus from Dijon to Santenay); Downgraded to D 74, D 674 and D 974 by 2006.
N75	Bourg-en-Bresse - Grenoble - Sisteron; Originally continued to Tournus, but this was downgraded to D 975 (one section became N 479; now D 979a) in 1972. The remainder was downgraded to D 1075 and D 4075 in 2005.

=== Routes nationales 76 to 100 ===
Number	Runs through:
N76	Tours - Vierzon - Bourges - Saint-Pierre-le-Moûtier
N77	Auxerre - Troyes - Châlons-en-Champagne
N77^{BIS}	Doudoye - Sombernon; Downgraded to D 977^{BIS} in 1972.
N77^{TER}	Bouillon - Sugny; Located in Belgium; downgraded to D 777 in 1972. Had no connection to the N 77.
N78	Chalon-sur-Saône - Louhans - Lons-le-Saunier - Saint-Laurent-en-Grandvaux
N79	Montmarault - Mâcon - Bourg-en-Bresse
N79^{A}	Bourbon-Lancy - N 79 (Saint-Aubin-sur-Loire); Downgraded to D 979^{A} in 1972.
N80	Autun - Le Creusot - Chalon-sur-Saône
N81	Nevers - Autun - Pouilly-en-Auxois
N82	Roanne - Saint-Étienne - Chanas
N83	Lyon - Bourg-en-Bresse - Lons-le-Saunier - Besançon - Belfort - Colmar - Strasbourg
N83^{A}	N 83 - A36 exit 14; Downgraded to D 1083 in 2006.
N83^{BIS}	La Villeneuve - Saint-Marcel; Became a portion of the N 73 in 1972; had no connection whatsoever to the N 83.
N84	Lyon - Nantua - Bellegarde-sur-Valserine
N84^{A}	Meximieux - Saint-Denis-en-Bugey; Became a portion of a rerouted N 84 (the old route of N 84 became D 984) in 1972.
N84^{B}	Collonges - Switzerland; Downgraded to D 984^{B} in 1972.
N84^{C}	Saint-Genis-Pouilly - Switzerland; Downgraded to D 984^{C} in 1972; the old route via Vesancy is now D 75^{H} following construction of a new route between Gex and Divonne-les-Bains.
N84^{D}	La Cluse - Oyonnax; Downgraded to D 984^{D} in 1972.
N85	Bourgoin-Jallieu - Grenoble - Gap - Digne-les-Bains - Grasse - Cannes
N85^{A}	N 85 - La Chapelle-en-Valgaudémar; Downgraded to D 985^{A} in 1972.
N86	Bollène - Bagnols-sur-Cèze; formerly a section of the D 994 (and N 94 before that). Originally ran from Lyon to Nîmes via Beaucaire. Downgraded to D 86, D 386, D 486 D 1086 and D 6086 by 2006.
N87	Grenoble southern ring road Originally ran from Remoulins to Pézenas via Nîmes, Lunel, Montpellier and Mèze. In 1952, the section from Remoulins to Nîmes became a portion of an extended N 86 and the section from Nîmes to Pézenas became a portion of the N 113.
N88	Lyon - Saint-Étienne - Le Puy-en-Velay - Mende - Rodez - Albi - Toulouse
N89	Lyon - Thiers - Clermont-Ferrand - Tulle - Périgueux - Libourne - Bordeaux
N90	Grenoble - Albertville - Bourg-Saint-Maurice - Col du Petit Saint-Bernard
N91	Grenoble - Briançon
N92	Romans-sur-Isère - Moirans
N93	Originally ran from Fiancey to Sisteron. In the 1950s, N 93 was rerouted to the N 75 at Aspres-sur-Buëch; the old route became the N 93^{B} and N 75. Downgraded to the D 93 and D 993 in 1972; now D 493. Next used from Viviers to Pierrelatte. Downgraded to D 93 and D 93^{N} in 2005.
N93^{B}	Saint-Pierre-d'Argençon - Aspremont; Former routing of the N 93 before it was rerouted to Aspres-sur-Buëch (the remainder of old N 93 from Aspremont to Sisteron became a portion of the N 75). Downgraded to D 993^{B} in 1972.
N94	Gap - Montgenèvre
N95	Tain-l'Hermitage - A7 (exit 13)
N96	Aubagne - Aix-en-Provence - Manosque - Château-Arnoux-Saint-Auban
N97	Toulon - Le Luc
N98	Toulon - Fréjus - Saint-Raphaël - Cannes - Nice - Menton
N98^{A}	Gassin - Saint-Tropez; Downgraded to D 98^{A} in 1972.
N99	First used from Montauban to Plan-d'Orgon. This was downgraded to the D 999 and D 99 (portions now D 988 and D 88) in 1972. Next used in Nice from the N 7 to the N 202; this was decommissioned in 2006.
N100	Remoulins (A9) - Avignon; Originally continued to the Italian border. Swapped with the N100^{A} in 1961 and replaced the N 100^{A} and N 100^{B}. The section from Digne-les-Bains to the Italian border was downgraded to D 900 in 1972 and the section from Avignon to the Durance valley was downgraded to D 901, D 900 and D 4100 in 2007.
N100^{A}	First used from the N 100 to the N 94. Became the N 100^{C} in the mid 1930s. Next used from Digne-les-Bains to Col du Labouret via La Javie. Swapped with the N 100 in 1961, so that the N 100^{A} ran via Barles and Verdaches. Downgraded to D 900^{A} in the 1970s.
N100^{B}	Originally ran from Selonnet to Saint-Vincent-les-Forts via the Saint-Jean pass; this was replaced by a rerouted N 100 in 1961. N 100^{B} was reassigned to a route from Gap to Saint-Vincent-les-Forts; this was downgraded to D 900^{B} in 1972.
N100^{C}	First used from Île-de-Rousset (N 100) to Grand-Pré (N 94), formerly N 100 until 1926 and the N 100^{A} from 1926 to the mid 1930s. This route is gone, submerged beneath the waters of the Serre-Ponçon reservoir. Reassigned to a route from the N 100^{B} south of Espinasses to Selonnet; this was downgraded to D 900^{C} in 1973.

=== Routes nationales 101 to 125 ===
Number	Runs through:
N101	Eastern bypass of Remoulins - Link N86-N100
N102	Vergongheon - Brioude - Le Puy-en-Velay and Pradelles - Aubenas - Montélimar
N103	Conflans-en-Jarnisy - Briey
N104	Lognes - Évry - Les Ulis (Francilienne)
N105	Melun - Montereau-Fault-Yonne
N106	Nîmes - Alès - Florac - Mende - Saint-Chély-d'Apcher
N107	Vedène - Le Pontet - Montfavet
N108	Marvejols - Barjac
N109	Clermont-l'Hérault - Montpellier
N110	Montpellier - Alès
N111	Biriatou - A63
N112	Montpellier - Béziers - Castres - Albi
N113	Bordeaux - Agen - Toulouse - Carcassonne - Narbonne - Pézenas - Montpellier - Nîmes - Arles - Salon-de-Provence - Marseille
N114	Perpignan - Cerbère
N115	Le Boulou - Col d'Ares
N116	Perpignan - Bourg-Madame
N117	Toulouse - Tarbes - Pau - Bayonne
N118	Sèvres - Les Ulis
N119	Carcassonne - Pamiers - Lescure
N120	Uzerche - Tulle - Aurillac - Espalion - Rodez
N121	Saint-Flour - Espalion
N122	Clermont-Ferrand ou Massiac - Aurillac - Villefranche-de-Rouergue - Toulouse
N123	Chartres
N124	Toulouse - Auch - Mont-de-Marsan - Dax - Saint-Geours-de-Maremne
N125	Montréjeau - Fos

=== Routes nationales 126 to 150 ===
Number	Runs through:
N126	Toulouse - Castres
N127	Moissac - Montauban; Originally ran from Langon to Montauban. The portion between Langon and Moissac was renumbered as N113 in 1952. The remainder was downgraded in 1972 to RD 927.
N128	Montauban - Aubiet; Downgraded in 1972 to RD 928
N129	Avignon; Downgraded in 2024. A previous version of this route ran between Auch and Lac de Cap-de-Long but was downgraded in 1972 to RD 929.
N130	Port-Sainte-Marie - Nérac - Condom - Auch; Downgraded in 1972 to RD 930
N131	Bypass of Compiègne; Downgraded in 2006 to RD 1131. A previous version of this route ran between Agen and Manciet but was downgraded in 1972 to RD 931.
N132	Cherbourg
N133	Bergerac - Marmande - Mont-de-Marsan - Saint-Sever - Orthez - Spain (N-135); Downgraded in 1972 to RD 933
N134	Saugnacq-et-Muret - Mont-de-Marsan - Pau - col du Somport
N135	Bar-le-Duc - Ligny-en-Barrois
N136	Rennes
N137	Saint-Malo - Rennes - Nantes - La Rochelle - Saintes - Bordeaux
N138	Rouen - Alençon - Le Mans - Tours
N139	La Rochelle - Périgueux; Downgraded in 1972 to RD 939
N140	Cressensac - Figeac - Rodez
N141	Saintes - Angoulême - Limoges - Aubusson - Clermont-Ferrand
N142	Bourges
N143	Tours - Châteauroux
N144	Bourges - Montluçon - Riom
N145	Bellac - Guéret - Montluçon
N146	Avallon - A6
N147	Angers - Poitiers - Limoges
N148	Sainte-Hermine - Niort
N149	Nantes - Poitiers
N150	Niort - Royan

=== Routes nationales 151 to 175 ===
Number	Runs through:
N151	Poitiers - Châteauroux - Bourges - La Charité-sur-Loire - Auxerre
N152	Fontainebleau - Orléans - Tours - Angers
N153	Thionville - Apach
N154	Louviers - Évreux - Dreux - Chartres - Artenay
N155	Heudebouville - Louviers; Downgraded to RD 6155 in 2006. A previous version of this route ran between Orléans and Saint-Malo but was downgraded in 1972.
N156	Blois - Châteauroux; Downgraded in 1972 to RD 956
N157	Orléans - Le Mans - Laval - Rennes
N158	Caen - Falaise - Sées
N159	Raves - Sainte-Marie-aux-Mines (via Tunnel Maurice-Lemaire); A previous version of this route ran between Tours and Laval but was downgraded in 1972.
N160	Angers - Cholet - La Roche-sur-Yon - Les Sables-d'Olonne
N161	Carcassonne; A previous version of this route ran between Angers and Cholet but was redesignated as N160 in 1972.
N162	Mayenne - Laval - Angers
N163	Saint-Jean-de-Linières - Rennes; Downgraded in 1972 to RD 963 and RD 163
N164	Montauban-de-Bretagne - Châteaulin
N165	Nantes - Vannes - Lorient - Quimper - Brest
N166	Ploërmel - Vannes
N167	Vannes - Lannion; Downgraded in 1972 to RD 767
N168	Quiberon - Dinard
N169	Lorient - Roscoff
N170	Argenteuil - Soisy-sous-Montmorency
N171	La Baule - Châteaubriant - Laval
N172	Bayeux - Saint-Lô - Coutances; Downgraded in 1970 to RD 972
N173	Franois - Vaux-les-Prés (A36); Downgraded in 2006 to RD 67. A previous version of this route ran between Granville and Avranches but was downgraded in 1972.
N174	Carentan - Saint-Lô - Vire
N175	Rennes - Pontorson - Avranches - Caen - Rouen

=== Routes nationales 176 to 200 ===
Number	Runs through:
N176	Pré-en-Pail - Domfront - Dinan - Interchange N12/E50
N177	Pont-l'Évêque - Trouville-sur-Mer
N178	Fougères - Vitré - Châteaubriant - Nantes - La Mothe-Achard; Downgraded in 1972 to RD 178 and RD 978
N179	Replonges; Downgraded in 2006 to RD 1179. A previous version of this route ran from Honfleur to Gacé but was downgraded in 1972.
N180	La Maison-Brûlée - Pont-Audemer - Honfleur; Downgraded in 1972 to RD 580 and RD 180
N181	Breteuil - Beauvais - Gisors - Saint-Aquilin-de-Pacy; Downgraded in 1972 to RD 981 and RD 181
N182	Tancarville Bridge
N183	Maintenon - Mantes-la-Jolie - Lattainville; Downgraded in 1972 to RD 983
N184	Saint-Germain-en-Laye - l'Isle Adam
N185	Paris - Versailles; Downgraded in 1972 to RD 985 and RD 185
N186	Versailles - Le Port-Marly; Originally, this route was a complete beltway around Paris but only a small section remains designated as a Route nationale.
N187	Pont de Neuilly - Clamart
N188	Massy / A10 - Les Ulis
N189	Beaumont - Ceyrat
N190	Nanterre - Saint-Germain-en-Laye - Mantes-la-Jolie
N191	Mennecy - Étampes - Ablis
N192	La Défense - Herblay-sur-Seine
N193	Bastia - Corte, Haute-Corse - Ajaccio
N194	Sartène - Vivario; Downgraded in 1972 to RD 69
N195	Sagone - Évisa; Downgraded in 1972 to RD 70
N196	Ajaccio - Bonifacio
N197	Ponte Leccia - Calvi
N198	Casamozza - Bonifacio
N199	Bastia - Calvi - Ajaccio; Downgraded in 1972 to RD 81
N200	Corte - Aléria; Downgraded in 2014 to T 50

=== Routes nationales 201-299 ===
Number	Runs through:
N201	Chambéry bypass All of the route except the section in Chambéry (known as the voie rapide urbaine, or VRU) was downgraded to D 1201 in 2005.
N202	Nice Côte d'Azur Airport - Puget-Théniers - Barrême; Originally ran from Nice to Thonon-les-Bains; this was downgraded to D 902 and D 2202 in 1975. Portions of the current N 202 were downgraded to D 4202 and D 6202 in 2005; the portion in Nice is now M 6202.
N202^{A}	Guillestre - Villard; Downgraded to D 902^{A} in 1972.
N203	Annecy - Bonneville; Originally ended at Thonon-les-Bains. In 1972, the section from Bonneville to Findrol was renumbered to N 205 (now D 1205), the section from Findrol to Rosses was downgraded to D 905, the section from Rosses to Machilly was renumbered to N 206 (now D 1206) and the section from Machilly to Thonon-les-Bains was downgraded to D 903. The remaining section was downgraded to D 1203 in 2006.
N204	Breil-sur-Roya - Col de Tende tunnel (Italian border); Downgraded to D 6204 in 2006.
N204^{A}	La Trinité - La Turbie; Downgraded to D 2204^{A} (now M 2204^{A}) in 1972.
N204^{B}	Breil-sur-Roya - Italy (S 20); Became the southern portion of the N 204 (now D 6204).
N205	Passy - Mont Blanc Tunnel; former sections of N 505, N 203, N 506, N 202 and N 506^{A}. The section from Passy to Chamonix-Mont-Blanc was downgraded to D 1205 in 2005. Originally used from Nice to Barcelonnette via the Bonette Pass. The section from Nice to Pont de la Mescla was absorbed into the N 202 in 1920; the remainder was downgraded to D 2205 (now M 2205) in 1972.
N206	First used in 1860 from Collonges to Annemasse; extended to Rosses in 1866. Partially downgraded to D 906 in 1972. Next used in 1972 from Bellegarde-sur-Valserine to Douvaine, replacing portions of N 84, N 92, N 203 and all of N 203^{B}. Downgraded to D 1206.
N206^{A}	Étrembières - Monnetier-Mornex; Downgraded to D 906^{A} in 1972.
N207	Reillanne - Saint-Benoît (N 202); Downgraded to D 907 and D 4 in 1972; one section became a portion of the N 202.
N207^{A}	La Brillanne - Les Buissonnades; Downgraded to D 4^{B} and D 4 in 1972.
N208	Uvernet-Fours (N 202) - Annot; Downgraded to D 908 in 1972.
N209	Creuzier-le-Neuf - Varennes-sur-Allier
N210	First used in 1896 from the Gueydan Bridge to Barcelonnette as a result of an abandoned extension of the N 205. Initially numbered as N 212, it was renumbered to N 202 in 1920. Next used from Châteauneuf-Grasse to Pont de la Manda as a renumbering of the N 209^{A}. Downgraded to D 2210 in 1972; one section is now the M 2210. Used a third time in Bordeaux connecting exit 4 of the A630 to Bouscat; this was downgraded in several stages. Used a fourth time for the Troyes bypass. Downgraded to D 610.
N210^{A}	Vence; Downgraded to D 2210^{A} in 1972.
N211	Originally ran from Entrevaux to Logis-du-Pin; this was downgraded to D 911 and D 2211 in 1972. Next used from Le Bourget-du-Lac to Viviers-du-Lac, along the former N 514^{A}. Downgraded to D 1201^{A} in 2006.
N211^{A}	Puget-Théniers - Briançonnet; Downgraded to D 911^{A} and D 2211^{A} in 1972.
N212	Sallanches - Megève - Ugine - Albertville
N213	Link between N9 and A9 south of Narbonne; portion of the Narbonne ring road
N215	Bordeaux - Pointe de Grave
N216	Calais (A216) - Port of Calais
N217	Link between N17 and A22 north of Lille; Downgraded to D 710.
N218	Longwy (D 918) - Belgium (A28)
N220	Chambéry; Downgraded to D 10.
N221	Trélissac (N 21) - Saint-Laurent-sur-Manoire (A89 exit 16)
N222	Ploufragan (D 790) - Yffiniac (N 12/D 222)
N223	Le Mans - Changé; Downgraded to D 304.
N224	Mondonville (M 1/M 37) - Blagnac (M 902/M 904)
N225	Bergues (A25/D 916) - Dunkirk (A16/D 625)
N226	A11 exit 9 - N 23 (Le Mans); Downgraded to D 326 in 2006.
N227	Lesquin - Villeneuve-d'Ascq
N230	Bordeaux eastern ring road
N235	Amiens - Yzeux; Was part of N 35 before 1972; downgraded to D 1235 in 2006.
N237	Périgny (N 11/N 137) - La Pallice
N244	Reims (A34) - Cormontreuil (A34/A344); Reims eastern bypass
N247	La Crèche (A10) - La Crèche (N 11); Downgraded to D 647.
N248	Épannes (N 11) - A10 exit 33
N249	Nantes - Cholet - Bressuire
N250	A660 exit 2 - La Teste-de-Buch (D 259); Originally ran from Bordeaux to Arcachon; the section from Bordeaux to Facture was part of the N 650 before 1973. In 2006, the sections from Bordeaux to A660 exit 2 and La Teste-de-Buch to Arcachon were downgraded to D 1250.
N252	Blois (D 952/D 2152) - A10 exit 17; Downgraded to D 952a in 2006.
N254	Allaines-Mervilliers - A10 exit 12
N260	Angers (D 160) - Mûrs-Érigné (A87/D 160); Les Ponts-de-Cé eastern bypass In 2006, the section from Angers to the N 1160 at Sorges was downgraded to D 260 and the section from Sorges to Mûrs-Érigné was absorbed into the A87.
N263	Bayonne (D 810) - A63 exit 5 Was a portion of the N 132 before 1973. Downgraded to a local road in 2006.
N266	Saint-Louis - Bourgfelden - Switzerland; Downgraded in 2006.
N271	A71 exit 2 - Olivet (N 20); Downgraded to D 2271 in 2006.
N274	Rocade de Dijon (Dijon bypass, 18.5 km); Downgraded to M 274 in 2024.
N285	A8 exit 42 - Cannes (D 6007); Initially designated as N 567A; downgraded to D 6285 in 2006.
N286	Versailles (A86) - Saint-Cyr-l'École (N12); Absorbed into the N 12 in 2006.
N287	Meudon-la-Forêt - Le Petit Clamart; Former N 187; downgraded to D 987.
N296	Aix-en-Provence northern bypass
N296^{A}	Aix-en-Provence western bypass

=== Routes nationales 300-399 ===
Number	Runs through:
N304	Aubenas - Loriol-sur-Drôme
N312	Agde - A9 Exit n°34
N313	Aimargues - A9 Exit n°26
N320	L'Hospitalet-près-l'Andorre - Col de Puymorens - Porté-Puymorens
N330	Creil - Senlis - Meaux
N346	Rocade Est de Lyon
N383	Lyon eastern ring road

=== Routes nationales 400-499 ===
Number	Runs through:
N420	Molsheim - Saint-Dié-des-Vosges

=== Routes nationales 500-599 ===
Number	Runs through:
N505	Gaillard - Findrol; Became a portion of N 205 (now D 1205) in 1972.
N506	Chamonix - Switzerland; Originally began at Bonneville; this section became a portion of the N 205 (partially now D 1205) in 1972. The remainder was downgraded to D 1506 in 2006.
N520	Contournement de Limoges (Limoges bypass, 16 km)
N544	First used in 1930 from Gap to Orcières; formerly the GC 13. Downgraded to D 944 in 1973-1974. Next used in the Fos-sur-Mer industrial zone, linking Le Ventillon and the southern dock. Transferred to the Marseille-Fos Port as P 544 in 2005.
N545	First used in 1931 from La Fare-en-Champsaur to Chabottes; formerly the GC 15. Downgraded to D 945 in 1973. Next used from Fos-sur-Mer to the N 544, serving the Fos-sur-Mer industrial zone. Transferred to the Marseille-Fos Port as P 545 in 2005.
N546	First used in 1932 from Sisteron to Buis-les-Baronnies; formerly the GC 3^{B}, GC 3 and GC 14. Downgraded to D 946 and D 546 in 1973. Next used in the Fos-sur-Mer industrial zone, linking the N 544 and N 545 along the Fos-sur-Mer to the Pont-du-Bouc navigation canal. Transferred to the Marseille-Fos Port as P 546 in 2005.
N568	Raphèle-lès-Arles - Martigues - Marseille
N569	Orgon - Miramas - Istres - Fos-sur-Mer
N570	Avignon - Tarascon - Arles
N572	Lunel - Aimargues - Vauvert - Saint-Gilles - Arles - Salon-de-Provence

=== Routes nationales 600-699 ===
Number	Runs through:
N618	Saint-Jean-de-Luz - Col d'Aubisque - Col d'Aspin - Bagnères-de-Luchon - Saint-Girons - Argelès-sur-Mer; Downgraded to D 618 and D 918 in the 1970s.

=== Routes nationales 800-899 ===
Number	Runs through:
N814	Caen ring road

=== Routes nationales 1001 and beyond ===
Number	Runs through:
N1029	Pont de Normandie; Now D 929.
N1085	First used for the Dignes-les-Bains bypass. Next used from Grasse to Mougins. Renumbered to N 85.
N1141	Angoulême - Saint-Yrieix-sur-Charente; Absorbed into the N 141 in 2020.
N1154	Lèves - Amilly; Chartres northwest bypass
N1463	Sochaux - Montbéliard; Downgraded to D 663.
N1547	La Madrague-de-la-Ville - Saint-Jerôme (Avenue Arnavon - Avenue Salvador Allende); No relation to the N 547.
N2013	Cherbourg
N2027	Tôtes - Manéhouville; Former routing of the N 27; downgraded to D 927 in 2005.
N2079	Moulins - Dompierre-sur-Besbre; Former section of the N 480; downgraded to D 779.
N2141	
N2516	Aix-en-Provence - A51; Formerly the A516.
N2537	La Rochelle - Chef de Baie
N2621	Avenue de Paris, Blagnac

== See also ==
- Routes Départementales, the category below Routes Nationale in France
