= Route nationale 26 =

Road in France

The Route nationale 26, or RN26, is a highway in France connecting Verneuil-sur-Avre with Argentan.

== Route ==
The road starts with a junction on the N12 and heads west to L'Aigle passing through the Foret d'Aigle. The road by-passes the town to the south. Thereafter the road has been reclassified as the RD928 and follows the course of the River Risle. After Le Merlerault the road crosses the A28 autoroute. The road continues north west past the monument to Haras National du Pin. The road enters the Foret de Gouffern and enters the town of Argentan.
