= Orgeval, Yvelines =

Orgeval
- Commune
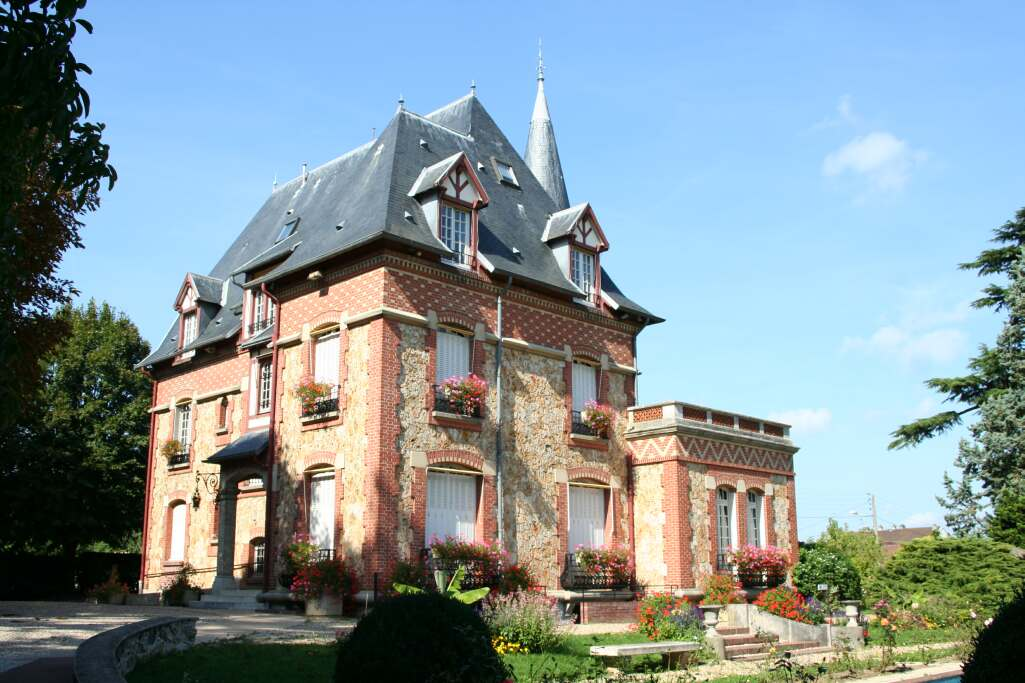
- Town hall

- Coat of arms
- Location of Orgeval
- Location within France Location within Île-de-France (region)
- Coordinates: 48°55′16″N 1°58′35″E
- Country: France
- Region: Île-de-France
- Department: Yvelines
- Arrondissement: Saint-Germain-en-Laye
- Canton: Verneuil-sur-Seine
- Intercommunality: CU Grand Paris Seine et Oise

Government
  - Mayor (2020–2026): Hervé Charnallet
- Area^{1}: 15.33 km^{2} (5.92 sq mi)
- Elevation: 100 m (330 ft)
- Highest elevation: 182 m (597 ft)
- Lowest elevation: 57 m (187 ft)
- Population (2023): 7,252
  - Density: 473.1/km^{2} (1,225/sq mi)
- Time zone: UTC+01:00 (CET)
  - Summer (DST): UTC+02:00 (CEST)
- INSEE/Postal code: 78466 /78630
- ^{1} French Land Register data, which excludes lakes, ponds, glaciers > 1 km^{2} (0.386 sq mi or 247 acres) and river estuaries.

Orgeval (French pronunciation: [ɔʁʒəval]) is a commune in the Yvelines department in the Île-de-France region in north-central France. It shares its name with the small river that runs through it, a tributary of the Seine. Its inhabitants are called the Orgevalais.

== Transport links ==
Orgeval is served by 3 carriers and 9 lines. The train station of St Quentin en Yvelines is the main station used by RER train lines 1 and 22 to travel to the city of Paris. Bus lines with day and night schedules are Line 20, Line 22, Line 50 terminating at Poissy, and Line 55. The Transdev Ile-de-France LINE 14 is also fully operational since upgrades completed to the Paris metro system.

== History ==
Orgeval's location has been inhabited since the Prehistory, where tools made from flint dating from the Neolithic times were found.

It is said that a water source was used by the Gallo-Romans for its therapeutic virtues. This source was actually rediscovered in 1708 by the abbey's doctor, but its use was stopped in 1850.

Orgeval's first real mention in history came from the building of Abbaye Notre Dame d'Abbecourt in 1180 by Gasce of Poissy, suzerain of Orgeval. This abbey which descended from the Roman Catholic Diocese of Chartres was destroyed at the beginning of the 19th Century.

Nowadays, Orgeval possesses a church with a Romanesque architecture from the 11th century. The church is composed of a spire and an octagonal tower. The church nave dates back to the 16th century.

== Population ==
Historical population
Year	Pop.	±% p.a.
1968	2,106	—
1975	3,236	+6.33%
1982	3,936	+2.84%
1990	4,509	+1.71%
1999	4,801	+0.70%
2007	5,795	+2.38%
2012	5,978	+0.62%
2017	6,263	+0.94%
2023	7,252	+2.47%
Source: INSEE

== Notable people linked to the commune ==
- Georges Docquois (1863–1927) : novelist and poet, died there.
- Catherine Rich (1932–2021): actress.
- Claude Rich (1929–2017): actor.
- Paul Strand (1890–1976) : important American photographer resided here with his third wife Hazel Kingsbury Strand from 1949 until his death in 1976.

== See also ==
- Communes of the Yvelines department
