= Le Val-Saint-Père =

- Commune
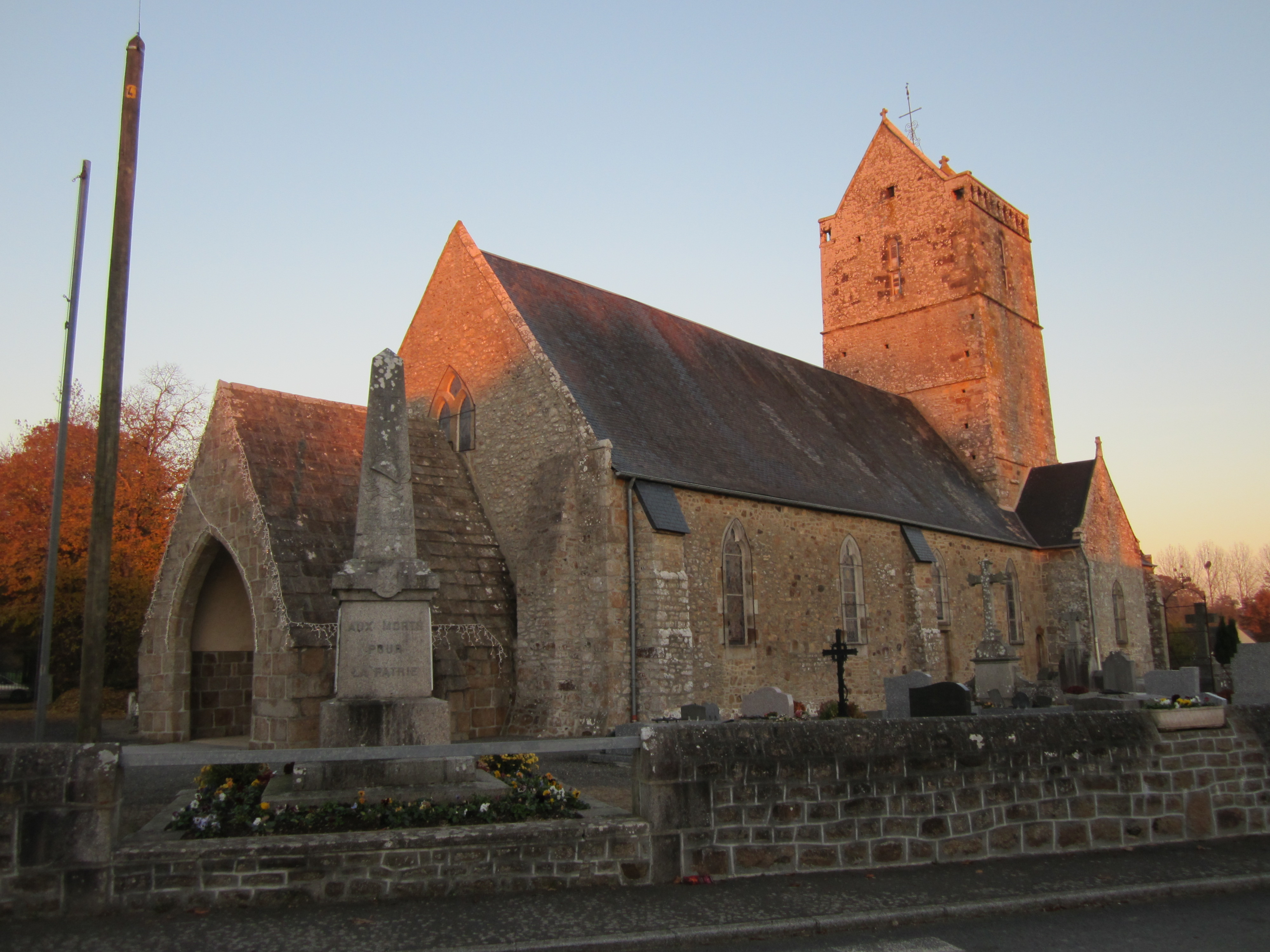
- The church of Saint-Pierre
- Location of Le Val-Saint-Père
- Location within France Location within Normandy
- Coordinates: 48°39′50″N 1°22′26″W
- Country: France
- Region: Normandy
- Department: Manche
- Arrondissement: Avranches
- Canton: Pontorson
- Intercommunality: CA Mont-Saint-Michel-Normandie

Government
  - Mayor (2020–2026): Marie-Claire Rivière-Daillencourt
- Area^{1}: 11.10 km^{2} (4.29 sq mi)
- Elevation: 18 m (59 ft)
- Highest elevation: 111 m (364 ft)
- Lowest elevation: 4 m (13 ft)
- Population (2023): 1,898
  - Density: 171.0/km^{2} (442.9/sq mi)
- Time zone: UTC+01:00 (CET)
  - Summer (DST): UTC+02:00 (CEST)
- INSEE/Postal code: 50616 /50300
- ^{1} French Land Register data, which excludes lakes, ponds, glaciers > 1 km^{2} (0.386 sq mi or 247 acres) and river estuaries.

Le Val-Saint-Père (French pronunciation: [lə val sɛ̃ pɛʁ]) is a commune in the Manche department in Normandy in northwestern France.

== Geography ==
Le Val-Saint-Père is situated on the Saint-Michel bay, and is near Avranches, Saint-Martin-des-Champs, Saint-Loup, Saint-Quentin-sur-le-Homme and Pontaubault.

== Demographics ==
The commune's population has held remarkably steady during the preceding two centuries, only showing a marked increase (100% growth) since the 1970s:

Historical population

| Year | Pop. | ±% p.a. |
|---|---|---|
| 1793 | 1,112 | — |
| 1800 | 1,136 | +0.31% |
| 1806 | 1,037 | −1.51% |
| 1821 | 1,025 | −0.08% |
| 1831 | 1,045 | +0.19% |
| 1836 | 992 | −1.04% |
| 1841 | 1,073 | +1.58% |
| 1846 | 1,238 | +2.90% |
| 1851 | 1,241 | +0.05% |
| 1856 | 1,167 | −1.22% |
| 1861 | 1,147 | −0.35% |
| 1866 | 1,158 | +0.19% |
| 1872 | 1,092 | −0.97% |
| 1876 | 1,158 | +1.48% |
| 1881 | 1,183 | +0.43% |
| 1886 | 1,118 | −1.12% |
| 1891 | 1,092 | −0.47% |
| 1896 | 1,105 | +0.24% |
| 1901 | 1,000 | −1.98% |

| Year | Pop. | ±% p.a. |
|---|---|---|
| 1906 | 1,002 | +0.04% |
| 1911 | 944 | −1.19% |
| 1921 | 833 | −1.24% |
| 1926 | 842 | +0.22% |
| 1931 | 903 | +1.41% |
| 1936 | 963 | +1.29% |
| 1946 | 956 | −0.07% |
| 1954 | 1,031 | +0.95% |
| 1962 | 916 | −1.47% |
| 1968 | 857 | −1.10% |
| 1975 | 1,340 | +6.59% |
| 1982 | 1,594 | +2.51% |
| 1990 | 1,609 | +0.12% |
| 1999 | 1,574 | −0.24% |
| 2007 | 1,869 | +2.17% |
| 2012 | 1,909 | +0.42% |
| 2017 | 2,043 | +1.37% |
| 2023 | 1,898 | −1.22% |

Source: EHESS and INSEE

== Points of interest ==
- The Avranches airfield is situated in Val-Saint-Père, in Bouillé.
- Le Gué de l'Épine affords a view of Mont Saint-Michel.

== See also ==
- Communes of the Manche department
