= Ducey-Les Chéris =

- Commune
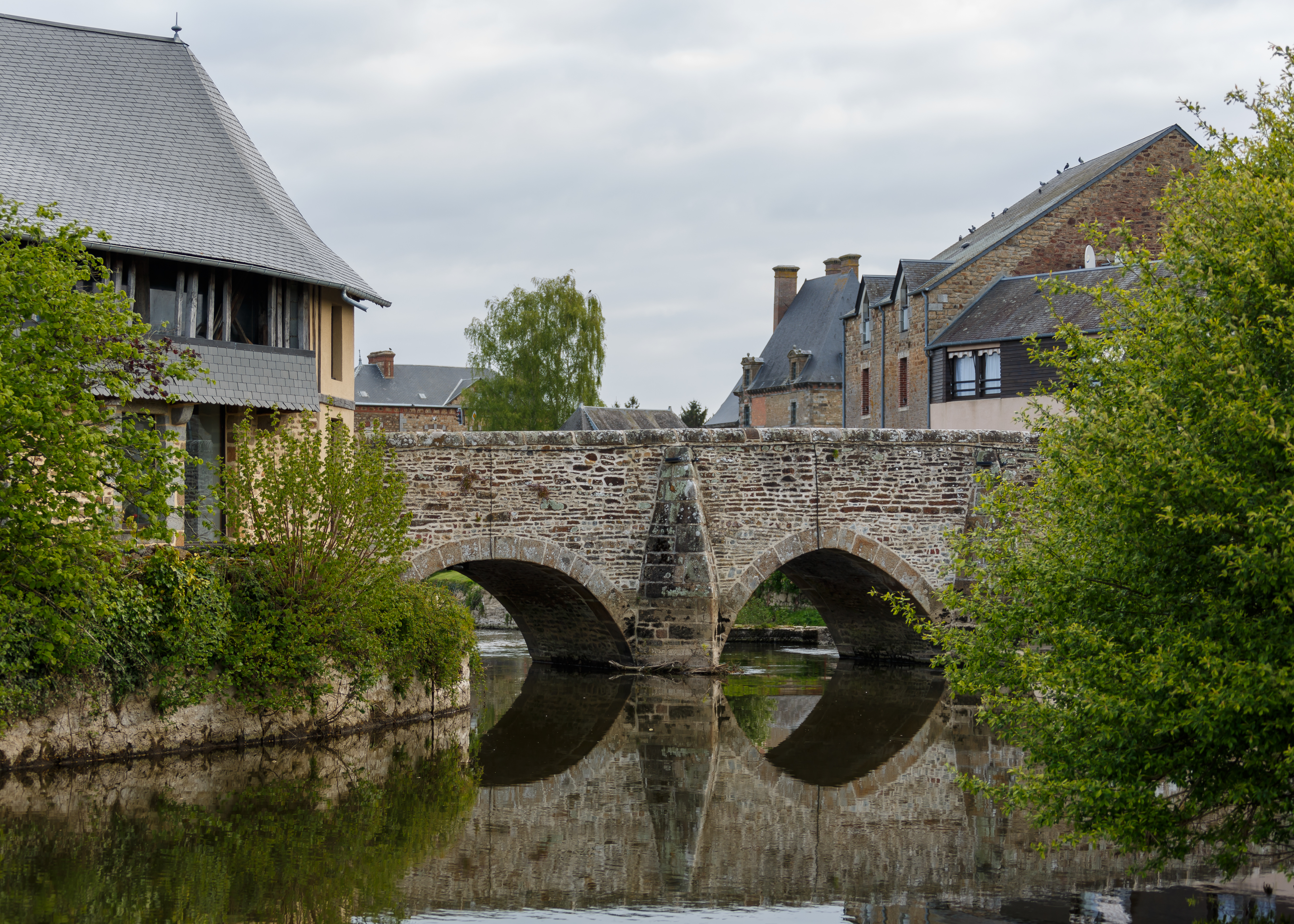
- The old bridge over the Sélune river in Ducey-Les Chéris

- Coat of arms
- Location of Ducey-Les Chéris
- Location within France Location within Normandy
- Coordinates: 48°37′01″N 1°17′24″W
- Country: France
- Region: Normandy
- Department: Manche
- Arrondissement: Avranches
- Canton: Pontorson
- Intercommunality: CA Mont-Saint-Michel-Normandie

Government
  - Mayor (2020–2026): Isabelle Labiche
- Area^{1}: 17.08 km^{2} (6.59 sq mi)
- Highest elevation: 140 m (460 ft)
- Lowest elevation: 6 m (20 ft)
- Population (2023): 2,784
  - Density: 163.0/km^{2} (422.2/sq mi)
- Time zone: UTC+01:00 (CET)
  - Summer (DST): UTC+02:00 (CEST)
- INSEE/Postal code: 50168 /50220
- ^{1} French Land Register data, which excludes lakes, ponds, glaciers > 1 km^{2} (0.386 sq mi or 247 acres) and river estuaries.

Ducey-Les Chéris (French pronunciation: [dysɛ le ʃeʁi]) is a commune in the department of Manche, northwestern France.

== History ==
The municipality was established on 1 January 2016 by merger of the former communes of Ducey (the seat) and Les Chéris. The communes of Ducey and Les Chéris become delegated communes.

== Population ==
Population data refer to the area corresponding with the commune as of January 2025.

Historical population
Year	Pop.	±% p.a.
1968	2,076	—
1975	2,151	+0.51%
1982	2,318	+1.07%
1990	2,309	−0.05%
1999	2,408	+0.47%
2007	2,602	+0.97%
2012	2,753	+1.13%
2017	2,786	+0.24%
2023	2,784	−0.01%
Source: INSEE

== Administration ==
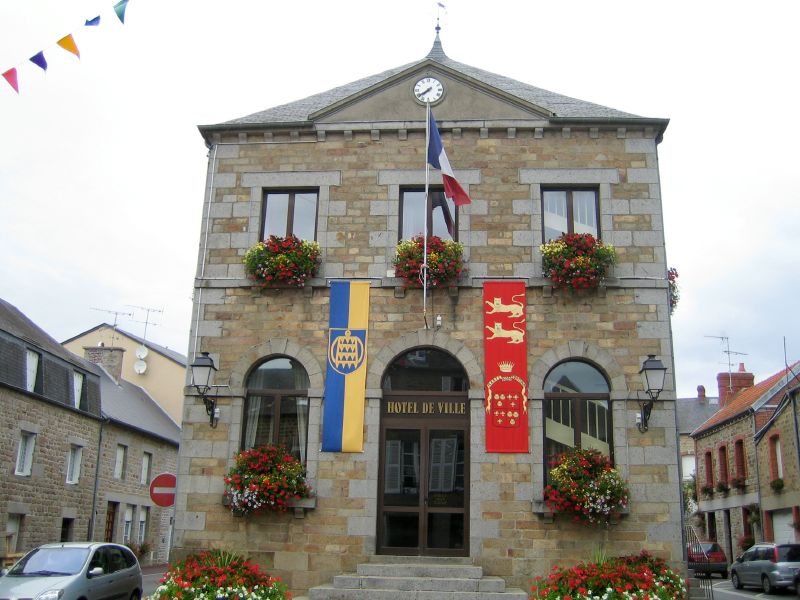
Town hall of Ducey

Term	Mayor	Party	Occupation
2016–2020	Denis Laporte	Ind.	Driving instructor Delegate mayor of Ducey
2020–incumbent	Isabelle Labiche		

== See also ==
- Communes of the Manche department
