= Juilley =

- Commune
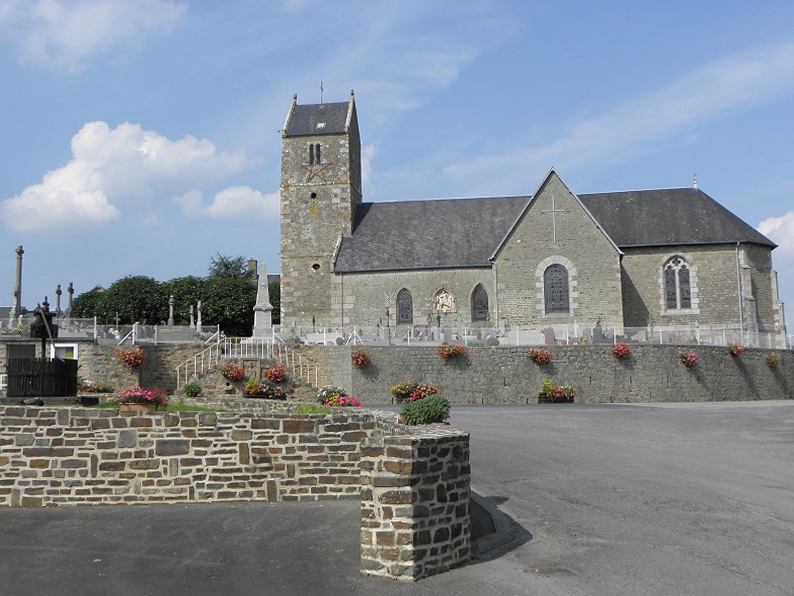
- The parish church of Juilley
- Location of Juilley
- Location within France Location within Normandy
- Coordinates: 48°36′01″N 1°20′34″W
- Country: France
- Region: Normandy
- Department: Manche
- Arrondissement: Avranches
- Canton: Pontorson
- Intercommunality: CA Mont-Saint-Michel-Normandie

Government
  - Mayor (2020–2026): Mickaël Lequertier
- Area^{1}: 11.23 km^{2} (4.34 sq mi)
- Elevation: 78 m (256 ft)
- Highest elevation: 86 m (282 ft)
- Lowest elevation: 25 m (82 ft)
- Population (2023): 691
  - Density: 61.5/km^{2} (159/sq mi)
- Time zone: UTC+01:00 (CET)
  - Summer (DST): UTC+02:00 (CEST)
- INSEE/Postal code: 50259 /50220
- ^{1} French Land Register data, which excludes lakes, ponds, glaciers > 1 km^{2} (0.386 sq mi or 247 acres) and river estuaries.

Juilley (French pronunciation: [ʒɥijɛ]) is a commune in the Manche department in north-western France.

== Traffic ==
From 29 July 1901 to 31 December 1933, Juilley was connected via the 17 kilometres (11 miles) metre gauge Avranches–Saint-James tramway to Avranches and Saint-James, which operated three steam trains for mixed passenger and goods transport each day in both directions.

== See also ==
- Communes of the Manche department
