= Selune =

Selune may refer to:

- Sélune, a French river
- Selûne, a fictional deity in the Forgotten Realms

== See also ==
- Selane
