= Pontaubault =

- Commune
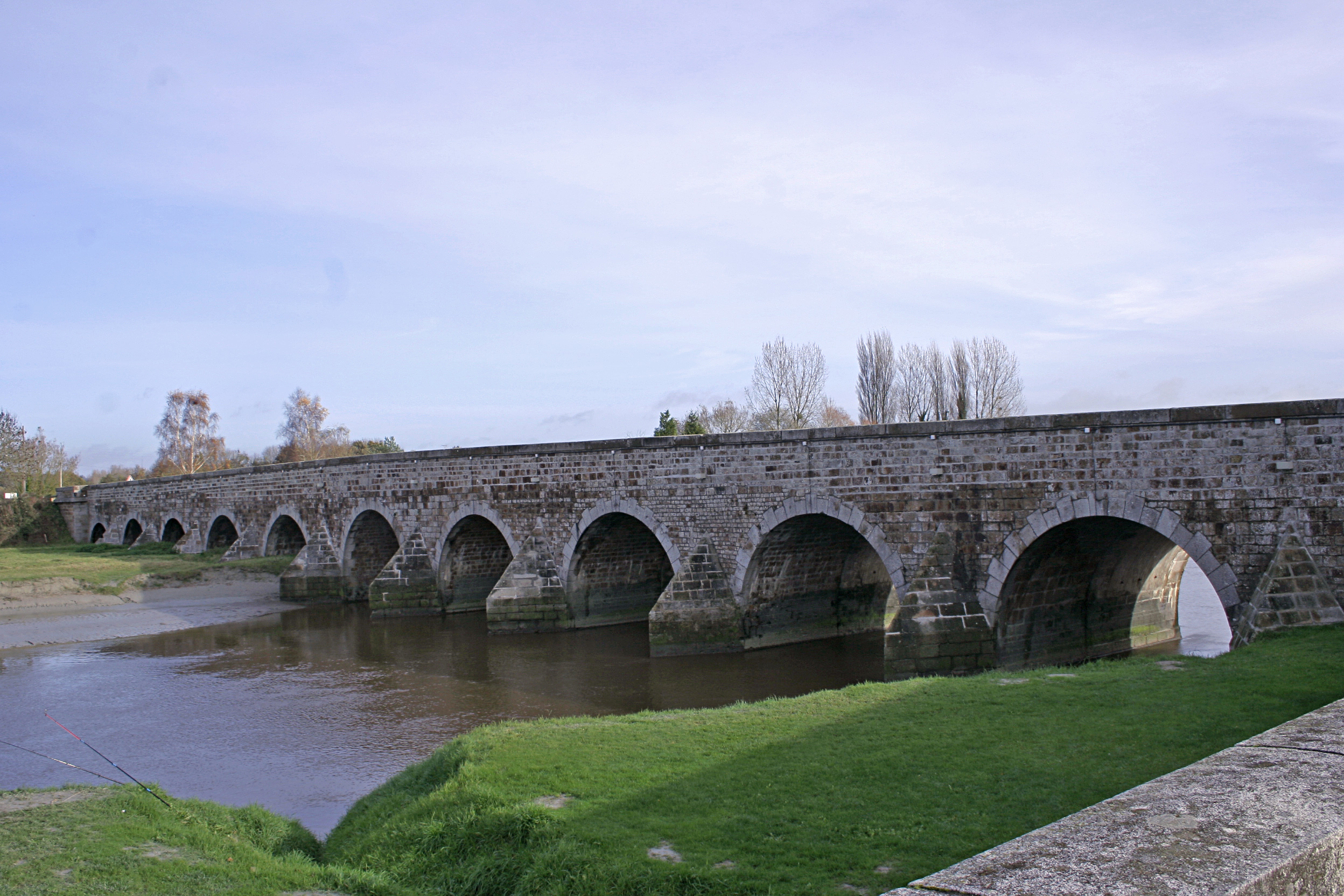
- The Aubaud bridge spanning the Sélune
- Location of Pontaubault
- Location within France Location within Normandy
- Coordinates: 48°37′48″N 1°20′59″W
- Country: France
- Region: Normandy
- Department: Manche
- Arrondissement: Avranches
- Canton: Pontorson
- Intercommunality: CA Mont-Saint-Michel-Normandie

Government
  - Mayor (2020–2026): Michel Perrouault
- Area^{1}: 1.94 km^{2} (0.75 sq mi)
- Elevation: 31 m (102 ft)
- Highest elevation: 72 m (236 ft)
- Lowest elevation: 7 m (23 ft)
- Population (2023): 579
  - Density: 298/km^{2} (773/sq mi)
- Time zone: UTC+01:00 (CET)
  - Summer (DST): UTC+02:00 (CEST)
- INSEE/Postal code: 50408 /50220
- ^{1} French Land Register data, which excludes lakes, ponds, glaciers > 1 km^{2} (0.386 sq mi or 247 acres) and river estuaries.

Pontaubault (French pronunciation: [pɔ̃tobo]) is a commune in the Manche department in north-western France.

== History ==
Patton's VIII Corps crossed the Pontaubault bridge on 1 August 1944 into Brittany following the success of Operation Cobra

== Traffic ==
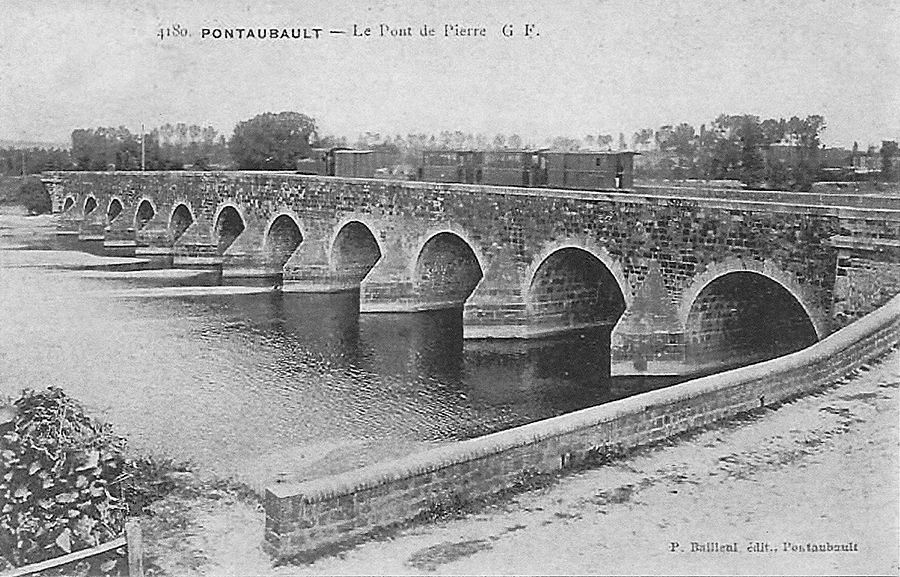
A steam train crosses the bridge over the Sélune at Pontaubault

From 29 July 1901 to 31 December 1933, Pontaubault was connected via the 17 kilometres (11 miles) metre gauge Avranches–Saint-James tramway to Avranches and Saint-James, which operated three steam trains for mixed passenger and goods transport each day in both directions.

== See also ==
- Communes of the Manche department
