= Vessey, Manche =

Vessey
- Part of Pontorson
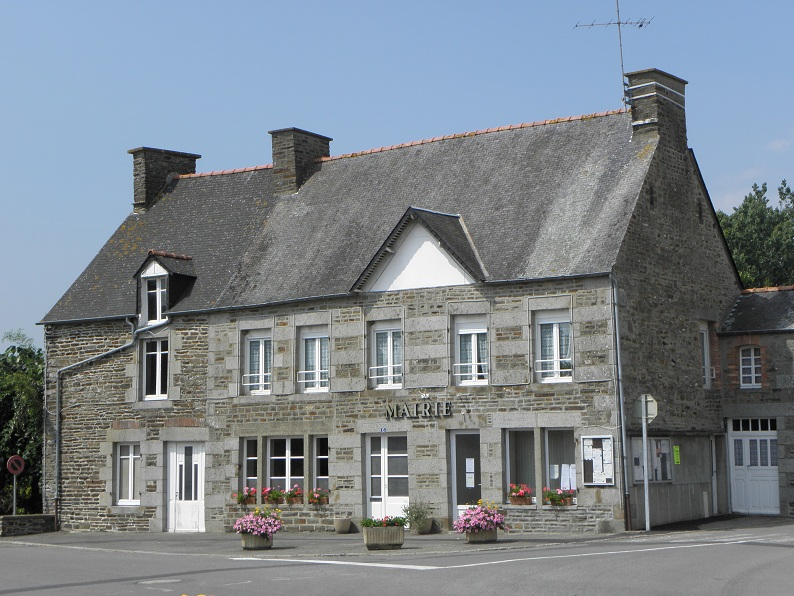
- Town hall
- Location of Vessey
- Location within France Location within Normandy
- Coordinates: 48°31′33″N 1°25′49″W
- Country: France
- Region: Normandy
- Department: Manche
- Arrondissement: Avranches
- Canton: Pontorson
- Commune: Pontorson
- Area^{1}: 12.59 km^{2} (4.86 sq mi)
- Elevation: 40 m (130 ft)
- Highest elevation: 87 m (285 ft)
- Lowest elevation: 19 m (62 ft)
- Population (2022): 381
  - Density: 30.3/km^{2} (78.4/sq mi)
- Time zone: UTC+01:00 (CET)
  - Summer (DST): UTC+02:00 (CEST)
- Postal code: 50170
- ^{1} French Land Register data, which excludes lakes, ponds, glaciers > 1 km^{2} (0.386 sq mi or 247 acres) and river estuaries.

Vessey (French pronunciation: [vɛsɛ]) is a former commune in the Manche department in Normandy in north-western France. In January 1973 it absorbed the former commune Macey. On 1 January 2016, it was merged into the commune of Pontorson.

== See also ==
- Communes of the Manche department
