= Servon =

Servon is the name of two communes in France:

- Servon, Manche, in the Manche département
- Servon, Seine-et-Marne, in the Seine-et-Marne département

ServON is also known as a hosting company, which is located in Aalborg, Denmark:

== See also ==
- Servon-Melzicourt, in the Marne département
- Servon-sur-Vilaine, in the Ille-et-Vilaine département
