= Gabriel de Lorges, Count of Montgomery =

French nobleman and soldier (1530–1574)

Gabriel de Lorges
- Count of Montgomery; Lord of Lorges and Ducey
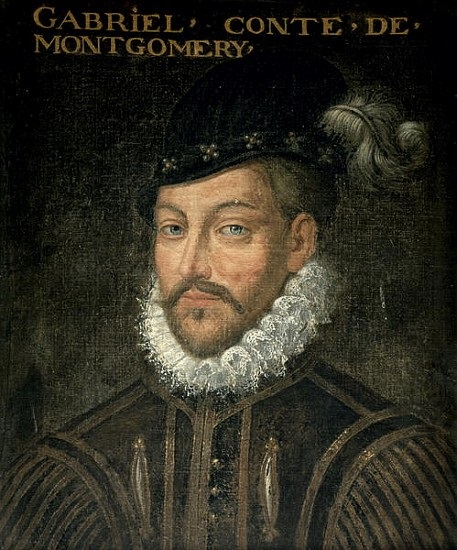
- Born: Gabriel de Lorges; 5 May 1530; Ducey, Normandy, France
- Died: 26 June 1574 (aged 44); Place de Grève, Paris, France
- Spouse: Isabeau de La Touche (m. 1550)

Gabriel de Lorges, Count of Montgomery, Lord of Lorges and Ducey (French: Gabriel de Lorges, comte de Montgommery; 5 May 1530 – 26 June 1574), was a French nobleman of Scottish extraction and captain of the Scots Guard of King Henry II of France. He is remembered for mortally injuring Henry II in a jousting accident and subsequently converting to Protestantism, the faith that the Scots Guard sought to suppress. He later became a leader of the Huguenots and was executed for his actions in the French Wars of Religion. A survivor of the St. Bartholomew's Day massacre, he was captured and executed in 1574 after leading an insurrection in Normandy.

== Career ==
Gabriel de Lorges was born on 5 May 1530 in Ducey, Normandy. He later became the captain of King Henry II's Garde Écossaise.

On 30 June 1559, during festivities for the double wedding of Elisabeth of France to King Philip II of Spain and Marguerite de France to the Duke of Savoy, Montgomery seriously wounded Henry II in a joust held in Paris. During the encounter, Montgomery's lance shattered, and fragments struck Henry in the eye and head, causing the injury from which he died several days later. From his deathbed Henry absolved Montgomery of any blame, before dying on 10 July 1559.

However, finding himself disgraced, Montgomery retreated to his estates in Normandy. There he studied theology and converted to Protestantism. His conversion aligned him with the Huguenot cause during the French Wars of Religion. Although Henry pardoned Montgomery, later Catholic and royalist writers treated his subsequent conduct harshly. Brantôme criticised Montgomery for showing insufficient repentance, noting that after leaving France he spent time in Italy and later took up arms during the civil wars.

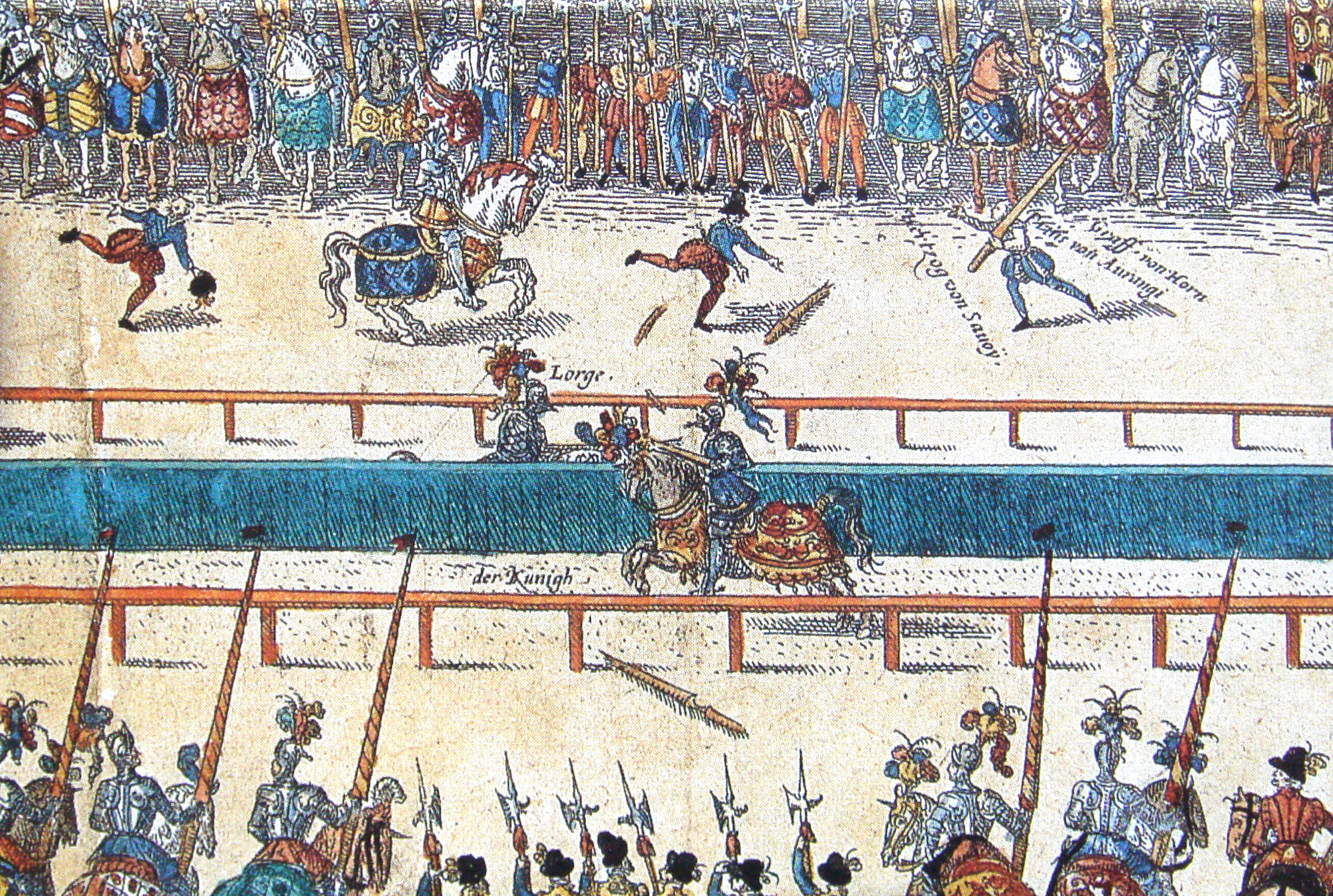
The fatal tournament between Henry II and Montgomery (Lord of Lorges)

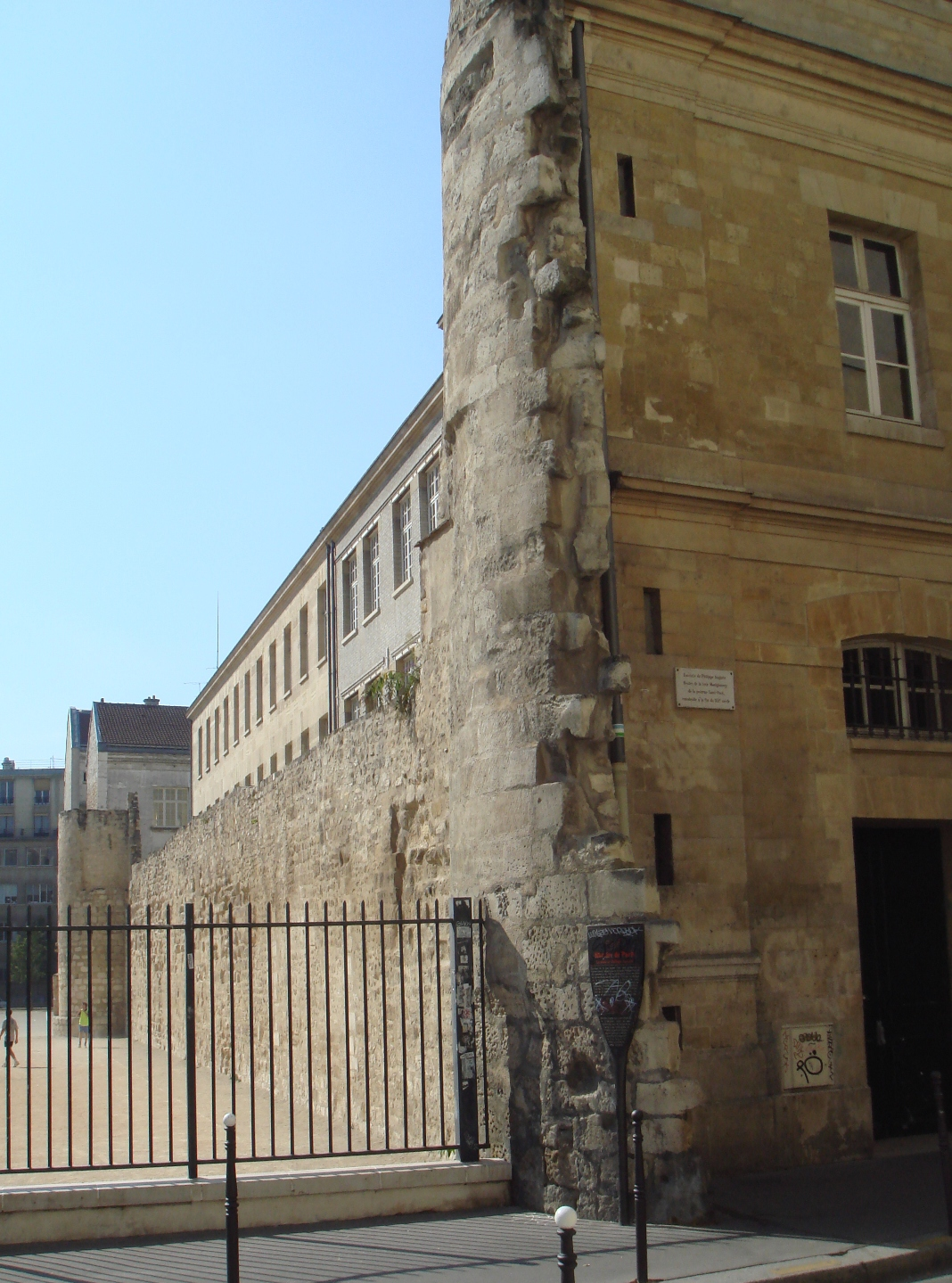
Remains of the Montgomery Tower in the wall of Philippe Auguste in Paris, where Montgomery was briefly imprisoned after accidentally killing Henry II in a jousting accident. Rue des Jardins-Saint-Paul, Paris

During the First French War of Religion (1562–1563), he fought for the Huguenots, capturing Bourges and leading several campaigns in his native Normandy. He led the defense of Rouen and escaped the city just as it fell to the enemy.

He remained in France after the Peace of Amboise brought an end to the fighting. He took up arms again in 1567 when the wars of religion were renewed, and served under Condé in the major campaigns of 1567, 1568, and 1569. Shortly after Condé's death at Jarnac in March 1569, Montgomery was tasked with restoring Jeanne d'Albret, the Huguenot queen of Navarre, to her territories in Béarn, which had been conquered by Catholic forces. He led a rapid campaign, which resulted in the destruction of a Catholic army at Orthez in August 1569.

In early January 1570, Montgomery linked up with the survivors of the disastrous battle of Moncontour. The combined army, led by Gaspard II de Coligny and the young princes of Condé and Navarre, fought the Catholics to a standstill at Arnay-le-Duc and imposed a favorable peace on the Crown.

Montgomery was one of the few leaders to survive the St. Bartholomew's Day massacre in 1572 after a wounded Huguenot swam across the Seine to warn him that rioting had begun. A price was put on his head, but he managed to escape to England. The queen mother, Catherine de' Medici, asked Queen Elizabeth I for his extradition, but Elizabeth refused.

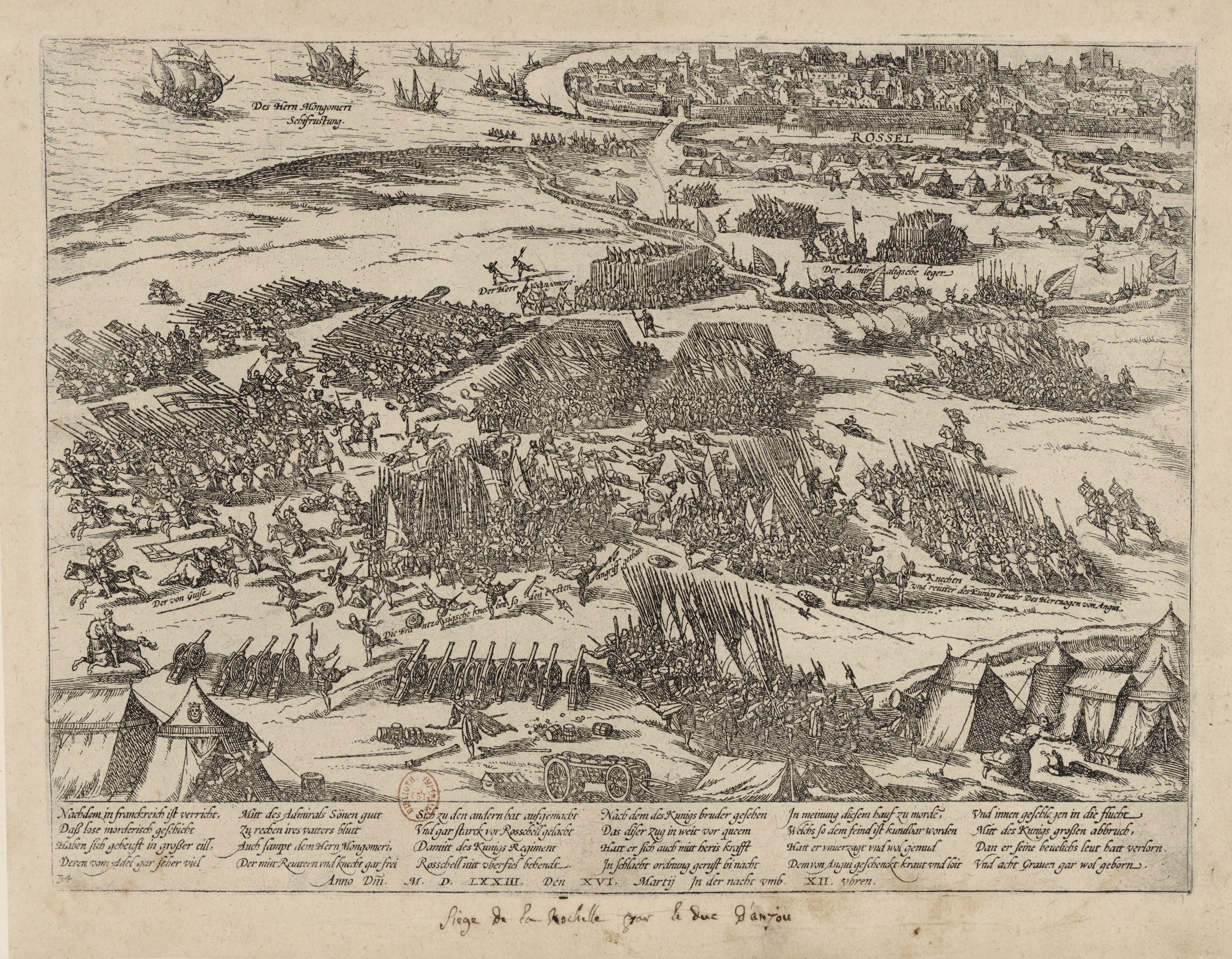
German print of the Siege of La Rochelle (1572–1573), with the city in the background, and the fleet of Montgomery in the upper left corner

Montgomery returned to France with a fleet in an attempt to relieve the Siege of La Rochelle in 1573. The following year he attempted an insurrection in Normandy, but was captured, taken to Paris, and sentenced to death. On 26 June 1574, as he was about to be beheaded, Montgomery was informed that a royal edict had proclaimed that his property would be confiscated and his children deprived of their titles.

A freely adapted version of Montgomery's life is told in Alexandre Dumas' novel The Two Dianas (1846–1847), and he appears as a central character in Johann August Apel's story "Klara Mongomery" in the Gespensterbuch (1811).

== Marriage and issue ==
In 1550, he married Isabeau de La Touche (died 1593), by whom he had four sons and four daughters:

=== Sons ===
- Jacques I de Montgomery (1551–1560)
- Gédéon de Montgomery (died 1596)
- Gilles de Montgomery (1558–1596)
- Gabriel II de Montgomery (1565–1635), who built the Château de Ducey, and was father to six children:
  - Louise de Montgomery
  - Gabriel III de Montgomery (1595–1635)
  - Suzanne de Montgomery
  - Louis I de Montgomery (1601–1682)
  - Jean de Montgomery (1605–1694)
  - Jacques III de Montgomery (1609–1682)

=== Daughters ===
- Suzanne de Montgomery
- Elisabeth de Montgomery
- Claude de Montgomery
- Roberte de Montgomery, wife of Gawen Champernowne (died 1591) of Dartington in Devon, by whom she had issue. In 1582 she divorced him for adultery and in 1595 married Thomas Horner of Cloford.
