= Les Chéris =

Commune in Manche, France

- Part of Ducey-Les Chéris
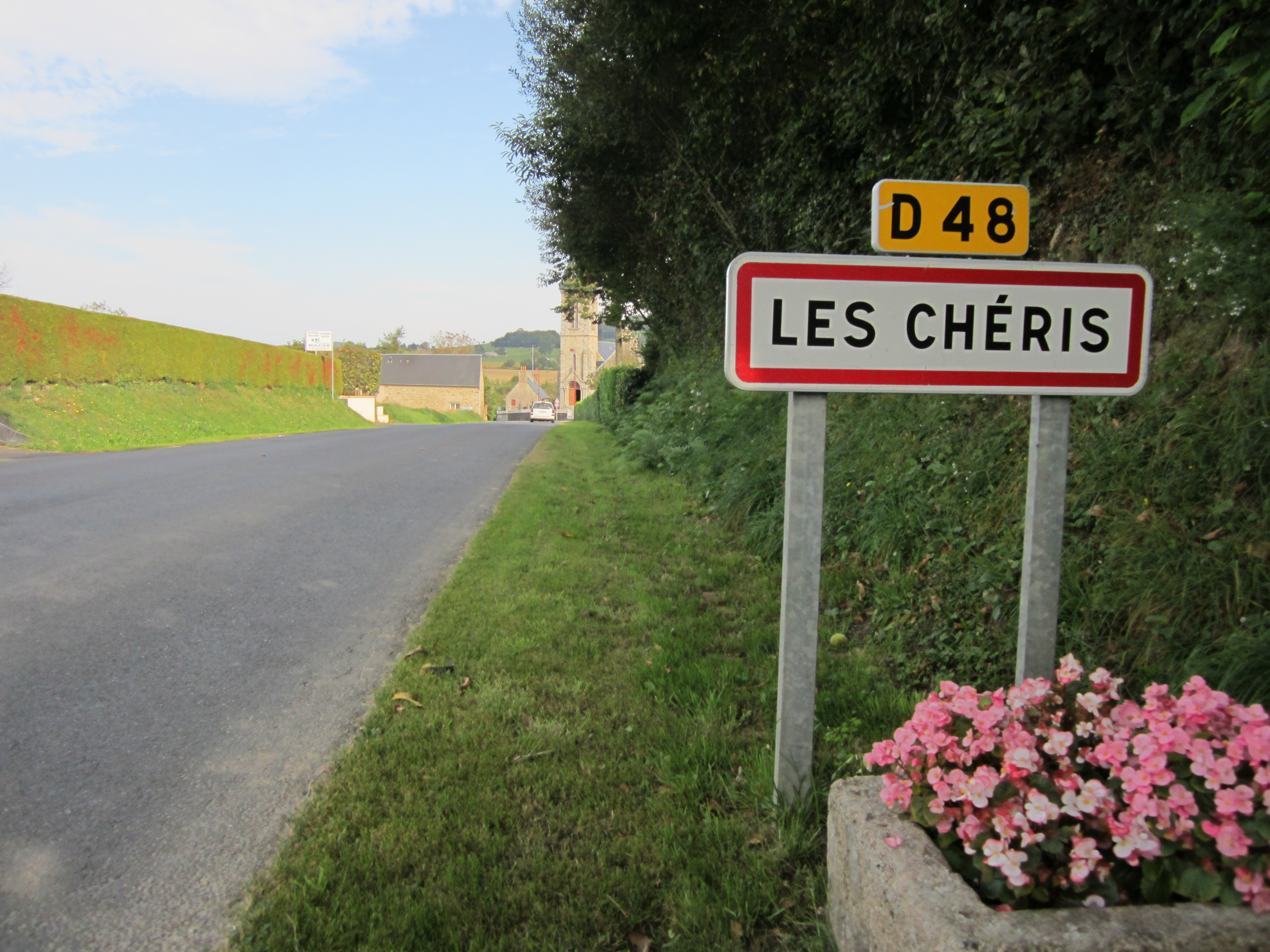
- Village entrance
- Location of Les Chéris
- Location within France Location within Normandy
- Coordinates: 48°38′04″N 1°15′32″W
- Country: France
- Region: Normandy
- Department: Manche
- Arrondissement: Avranches
- Canton: Pontorson
- Commune: Ducey-Les Chéris
- Area^{1}: 5.87 km^{2} (2.27 sq mi)
- Elevation: 29 m (95 ft)
- Highest elevation: 140 m (460 ft)
- Lowest elevation: 12 m (39 ft)
- Population (2022): 257
  - Density: 43.8/km^{2} (113/sq mi)
- Time zone: UTC+01:00 (CET)
  - Summer (DST): UTC+02:00 (CEST)
- Postal code: 50220
- ^{1} French Land Register data, which excludes lakes, ponds, glaciers > 1 km^{2} (0.386 sq mi or 247 acres) and river estuaries.

Les Chéris (French pronunciation: [le ʃeʁi]) is a former commune in the Manche department in Normandy in north-western France. On 1 January 2016, it was merged into the new commune of Ducey-Les Chéris.

== See also ==
- Communes of the Manche department
