= Macey, Manche =

Macey
- Part of Pontorson
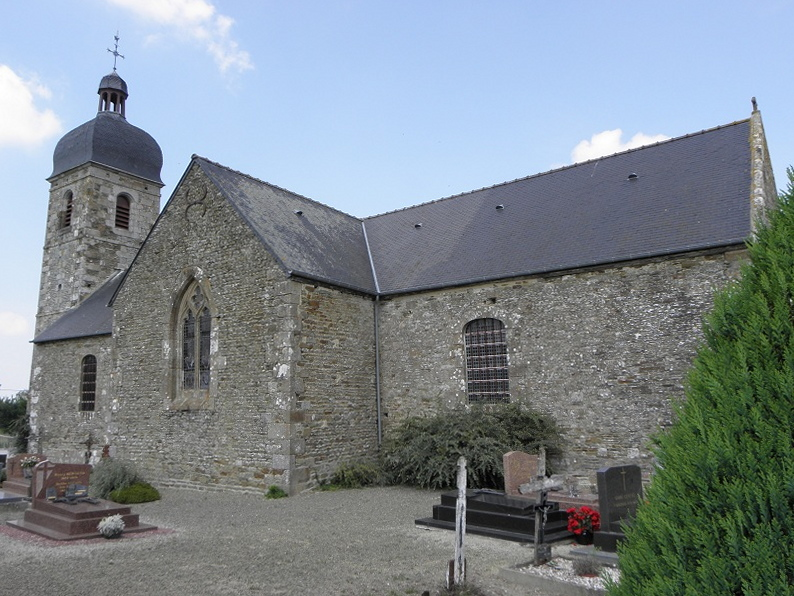
- The parish church of Saint-Sulpice
- Location of Macey
- Location within France Location within Normandy
- Coordinates: 48°33′45″N 1°26′05″W
- Country: France
- Region: Normandy
- Department: Manche
- Arrondissement: Avranches
- Canton: Pontorson
- Commune: Pontorson
- Area^{1}: 5.87 km^{2} (2.27 sq mi)
- Elevation: 25 m (82 ft)
- Highest elevation: 74 m (243 ft)
- Lowest elevation: 16 m (52 ft)
- Population (2022): 106
  - Density: 18.1/km^{2} (46.8/sq mi)
- Time zone: UTC+01:00 (CET)
  - Summer (DST): UTC+02:00 (CEST)
- Postal code: 50170
- ^{1} French Land Register data, which excludes lakes, ponds, glaciers > 1 km^{2} (0.386 sq mi or 247 acres) and river estuaries.

Macey (French pronunciation: [masɛ]) is a former commune in the Manche department in Normandy in north-western France. On 1 January 2016, it was merged into the commune of Pontorson.

== See also ==
- Communes of the Manche department
