= Marcilly, Manche =

Marcilly
- Commune
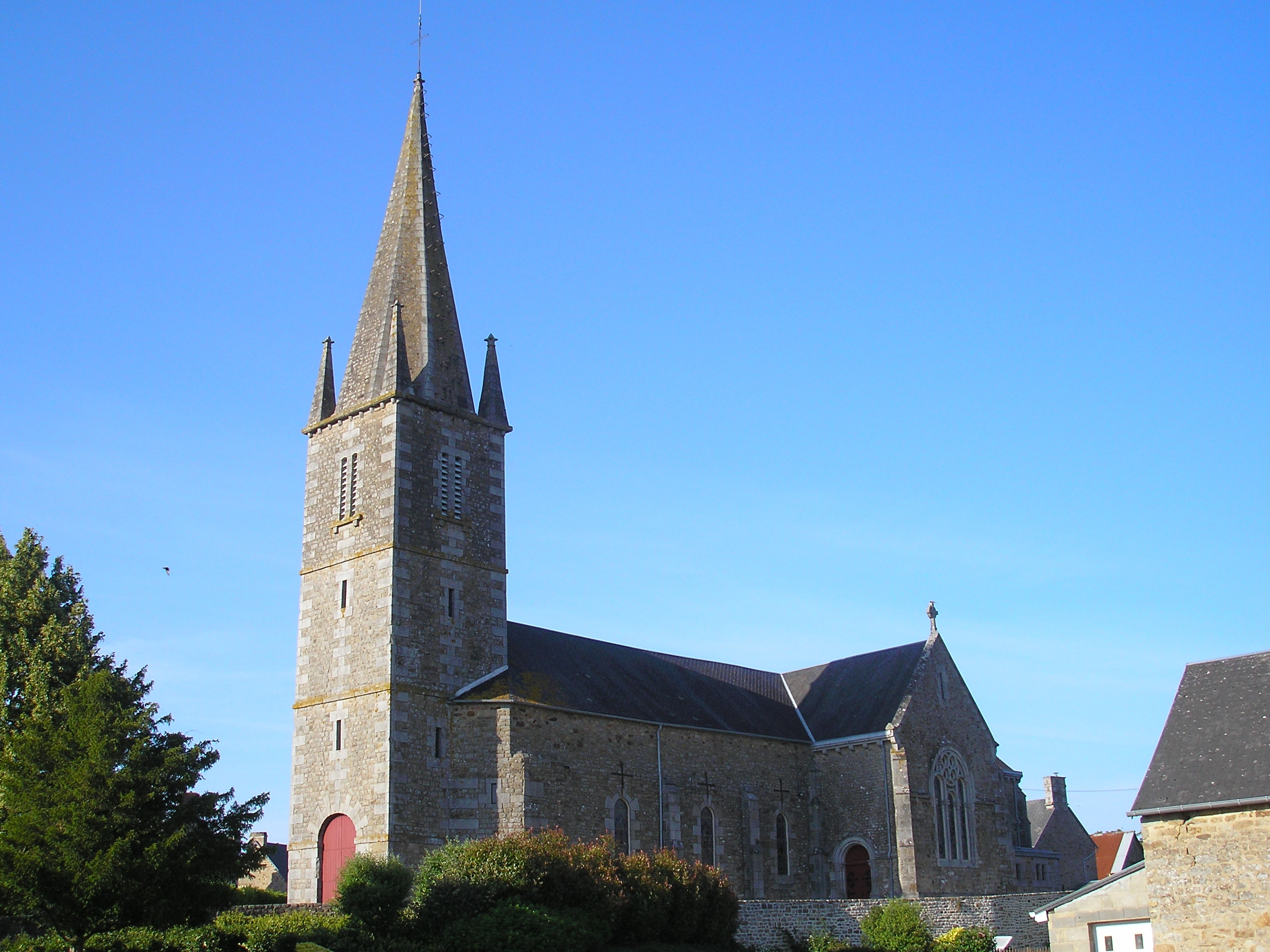
- The church of Saint-Martin
- Location of Marcilly
- Location within France Location within Normandy
- Coordinates: 48°38′55″N 1°15′03″W
- Country: France
- Region: Normandy
- Department: Manche
- Arrondissement: Avranches
- Canton: Pontorson
- Intercommunality: CA Mont-Saint-Michel-Normandie

Government
  - Mayor (2020–2026): Bruno Léon
- Area^{1}: 8.86 km^{2} (3.42 sq mi)
- Elevation: 21 m (69 ft)
- Highest elevation: 163 m (535 ft)
- Lowest elevation: 17 m (56 ft)
- Population (2023): 355
  - Density: 40.1/km^{2} (104/sq mi)
- Demonym: Marcillais
- Time zone: UTC+01:00 (CET)
  - Summer (DST): UTC+02:00 (CEST)
- INSEE/Postal code: 50290 /50220
- ^{1} French Land Register data, which excludes lakes, ponds, glaciers > 1 km^{2} (0.386 sq mi or 247 acres) and river estuaries.

Marcilly (French pronunciation: [maʁsiji]) is a commune in the Manche department in Normandy in north-western France.

== See also ==
- Communes of the Manche department
