= Sacey =

- Commune
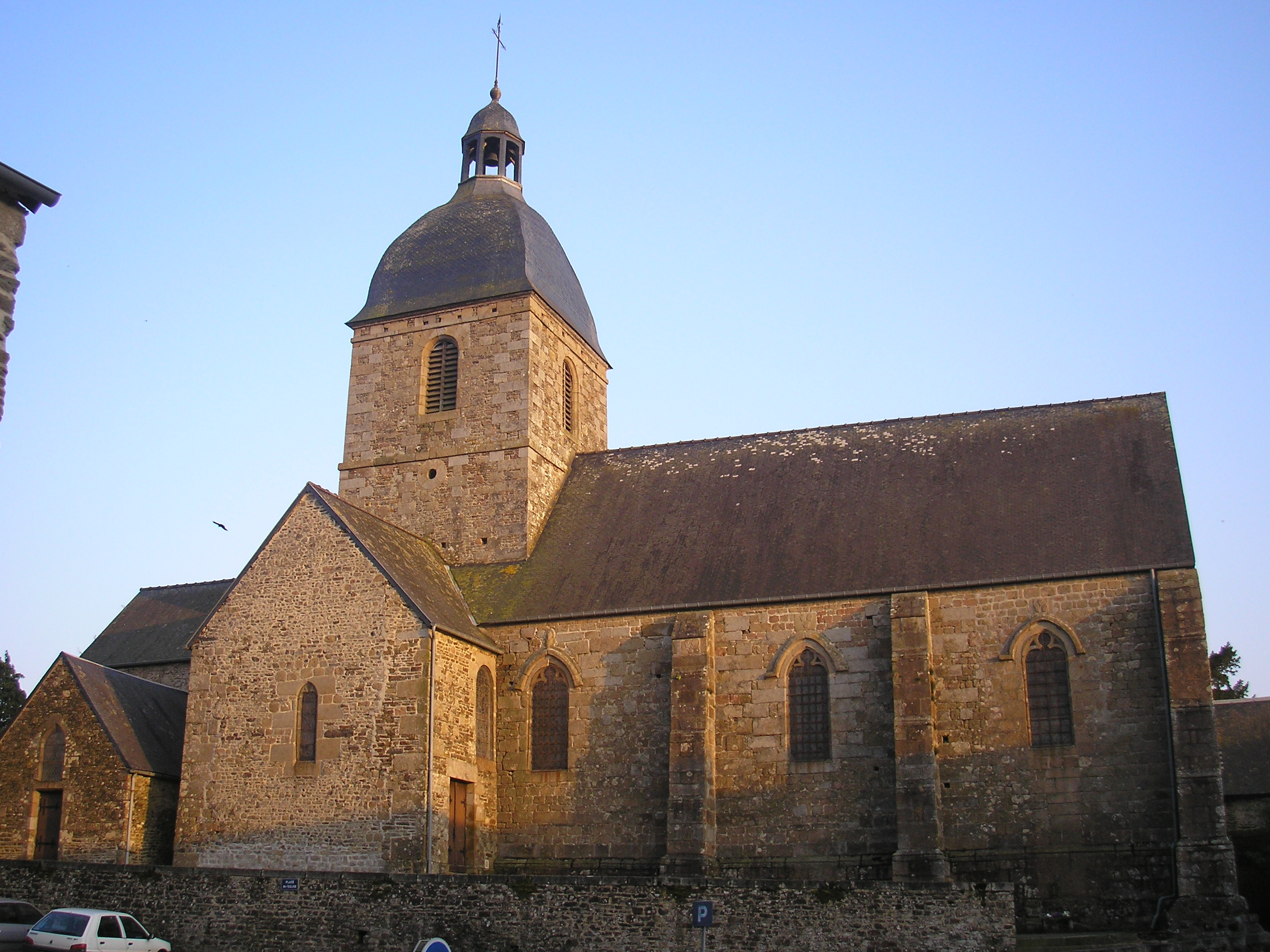
- The church of Saint-Martin
- Location of Sacey
- Location within France Location within Normandy
- Coordinates: 48°30′37″N 1°26′56″W
- Country: France
- Region: Normandy
- Department: Manche
- Arrondissement: Avranches
- Canton: Pontorson
- Intercommunality: CA Mont-Saint-Michel-Normandie

Government
  - Mayor (2020–2026): Didier Noël
- Area^{1}: 15.27 km^{2} (5.90 sq mi)
- Elevation: 80 m (260 ft)
- Highest elevation: 74 m (243 ft)
- Lowest elevation: 6 m (20 ft)
- Population (2023): 508
  - Density: 33.3/km^{2} (86.2/sq mi)
- Time zone: UTC+01:00 (CET)
  - Summer (DST): UTC+02:00 (CEST)
- INSEE/Postal code: 50443 /50170
- ^{1} French Land Register data, which excludes lakes, ponds, glaciers > 1 km^{2} (0.386 sq mi or 247 acres) and river estuaries.

Sacey (French pronunciation: [sasɛ]) is a commune in the Manche department in Normandy in north-western France.

== See also ==
- Communes of the Manche department
