= Le Mesnil-Ozenne =

- Commune
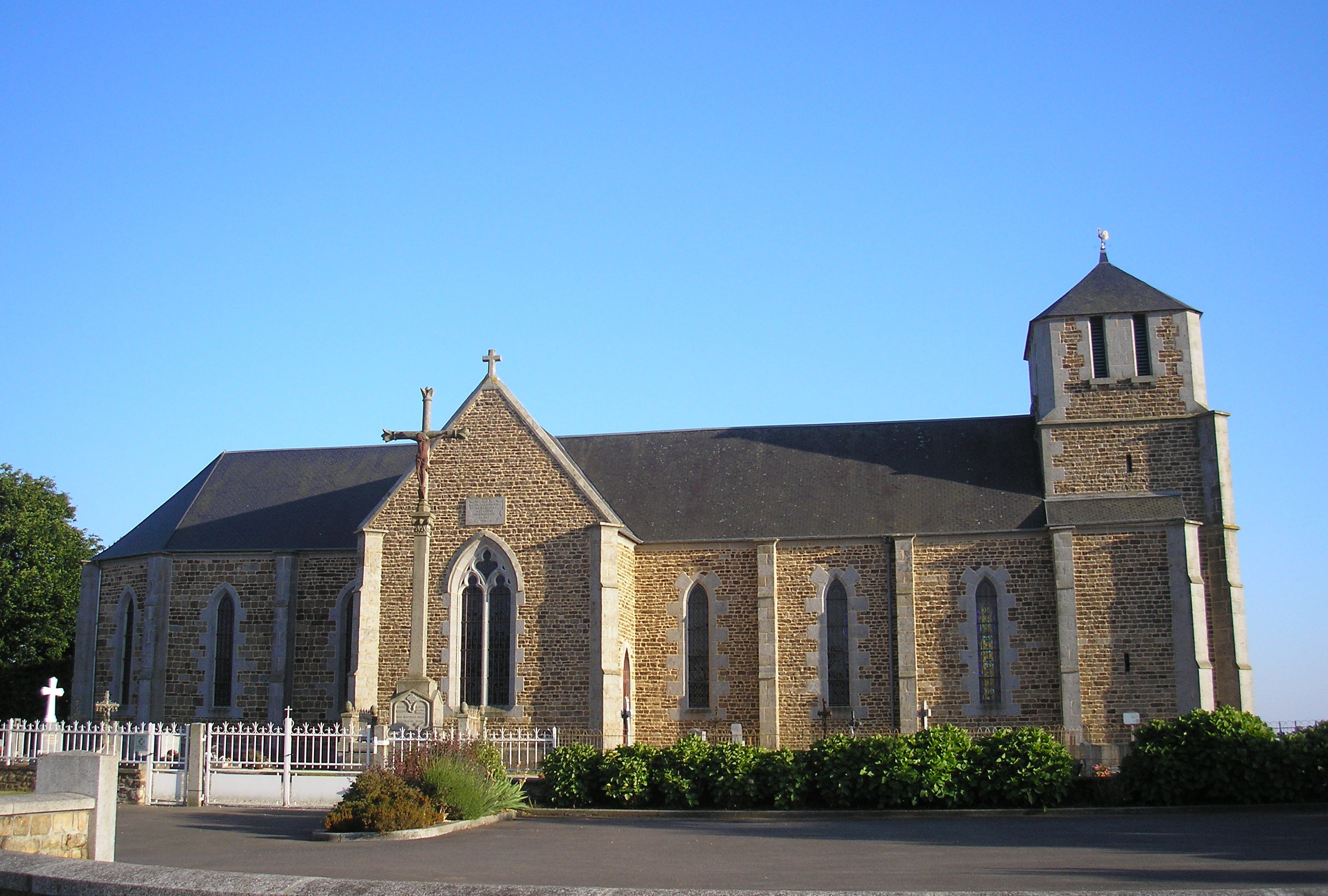
- The church of Saint-Martin
- Location of Le Mesnil-Ozenne
- Location within France Location within Normandy
- Coordinates: 48°40′04″N 1°13′46″W
- Country: France
- Region: Normandy
- Department: Manche
- Arrondissement: Avranches
- Canton: Pontorson
- Intercommunality: CA Mont-Saint-Michel-Normandie

Government
  - Mayor (2020–2026): Guy Trochon
- Area^{1}: 4.59 km^{2} (1.77 sq mi)
- Elevation: 135 m (443 ft)
- Highest elevation: 197 m (646 ft)
- Lowest elevation: 39 m (128 ft)
- Population (2023): 265
  - Density: 57.7/km^{2} (150/sq mi)
- Time zone: UTC+01:00 (CET)
  - Summer (DST): UTC+02:00 (CEST)
- INSEE/Postal code: 50317 /50220
- ^{1} French Land Register data, which excludes lakes, ponds, glaciers > 1 km^{2} (0.386 sq mi or 247 acres) and river estuaries.

Le Mesnil-Ozenne (French pronunciation: [lə mɛnil ɔzɛn]) is a commune in the Manche department in Normandy in north-western France.

== See also ==
- Communes of the Manche department
