= Saint-Cyr-du-Bailleul =

- Commune
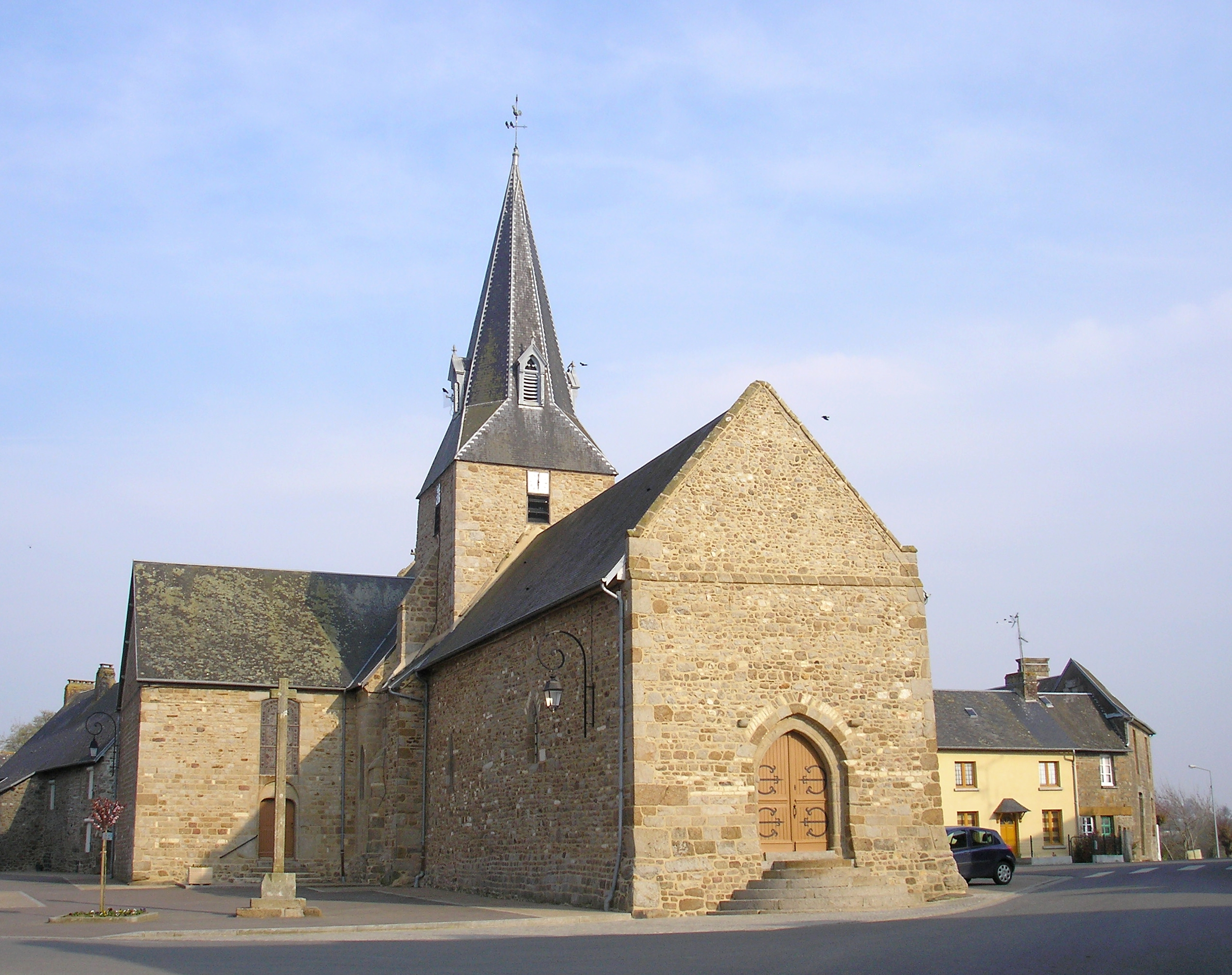
- The church of Saint-Cyr-et-Sainte-Julitte
- Location of Saint-Cyr-du-Bailleul
- Location within France Location within Normandy
- Coordinates: 48°34′00″N 0°47′56″W
- Country: France
- Region: Normandy
- Department: Manche
- Arrondissement: Avranches
- Canton: Le Mortainais
- Intercommunality: CA Mont-Saint-Michel-Normandie

Government
  - Mayor (2020–2026): Claudine Sauvé
- Area^{1}: 23.41 km^{2} (9.04 sq mi)
- Elevation: 62 m (203 ft)
- Highest elevation: 226 m (741 ft)
- Lowest elevation: 92 m (302 ft)
- Population (2023): 345
  - Density: 14.7/km^{2} (38.2/sq mi)
- Time zone: UTC+01:00 (CET)
  - Summer (DST): UTC+02:00 (CEST)
- INSEE/Postal code: 50462 /50720
- ^{1} French Land Register data, which excludes lakes, ponds, glaciers > 1 km^{2} (0.386 sq mi or 247 acres) and river estuaries.

Saint-Cyr-du-Bailleul (French pronunciation: [sɛ̃ siʁ dy bajœl]) is a commune in the Manche department in Normandy in northwestern France.

== Geography ==
The commune is made up of the following collection of villages and hamlets, La Gravengerie, Le Jarry, Saint-Cyr-du-Bailleul, Launay, La Ruaudière, Mongodin and L'hôtel aux Piels.

The source of the river Sélune is in this commune.

The commune is in the Normandie-Maine Regional Natural Park.

== Points of Interest ==
=== National Heritage sites ===
- La Pierre-Saint-Martin - a Neolithic sharpening stone, which was listed as a Monument historique in 1977.

== See also ==
- Communes of the Manche department
