= Courtils =

- Commune
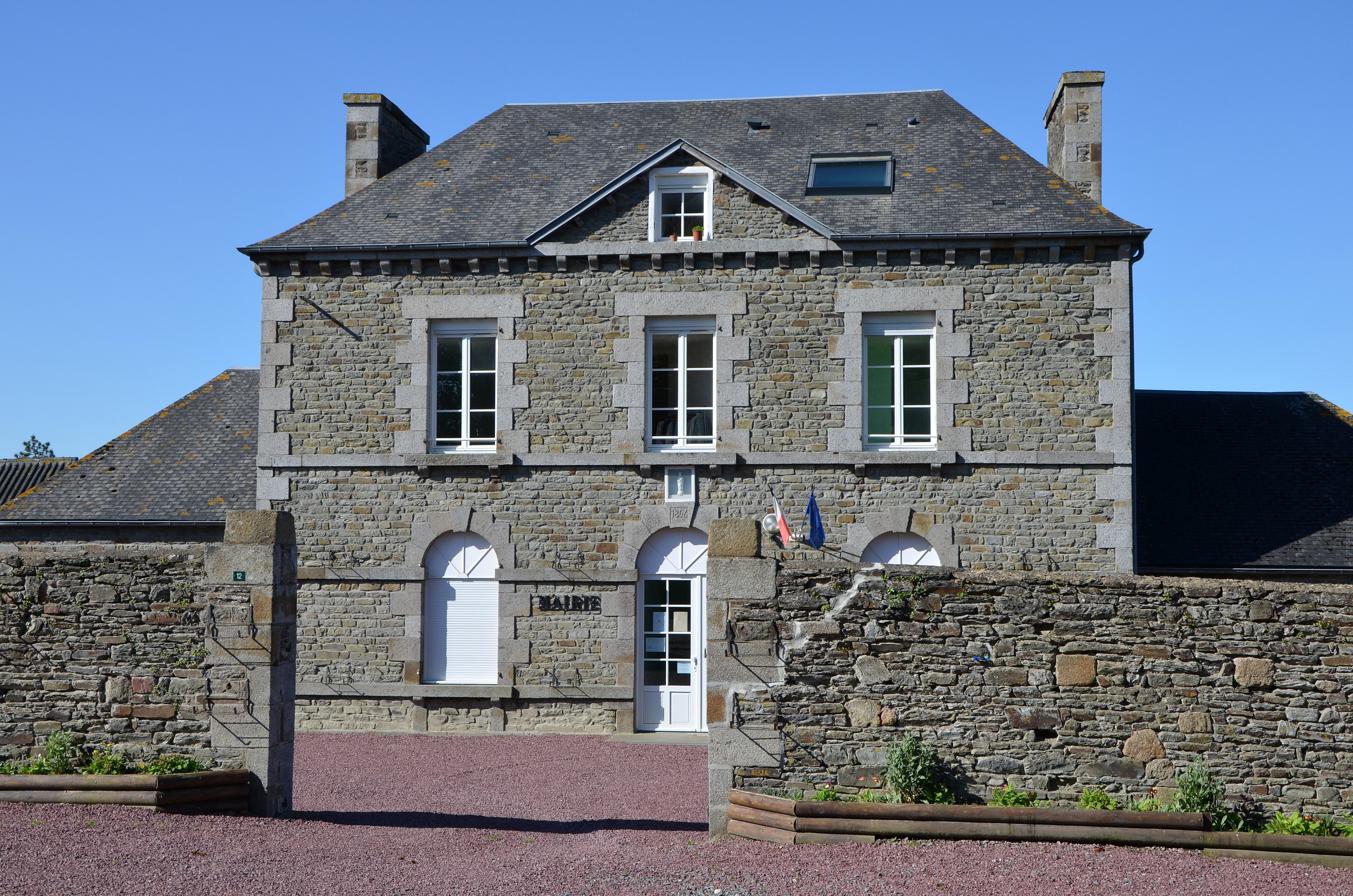
- Town hall
- Location of Courtils
- Location within France Location within Normandy
- Coordinates: 48°37′42″N 1°24′27″W
- Country: France
- Region: Normandy
- Department: Manche
- Arrondissement: Avranches
- Canton: Pontorson
- Intercommunality: CA Mont-Saint-Michel-Normandie

Government
  - Mayor (2021–2026): Bernard Lair
- Area^{1}: 5.39 km^{2} (2.08 sq mi)
- Elevation: 28 m (92 ft)
- Highest elevation: 28 m (92 ft)
- Lowest elevation: 4 m (13 ft)
- Population (2023): 210
  - Density: 39/km^{2} (100/sq mi)
- Time zone: UTC+01:00 (CET)
  - Summer (DST): UTC+02:00 (CEST)
- INSEE/Postal code: 50146 /50220
- ^{1} French Land Register data, which excludes lakes, ponds, glaciers > 1 km^{2} (0.386 sq mi or 247 acres) and river estuaries.

Courtils is a commune in the Manche department in Normandy in north-western France.

== See also ==
- Communes of the Manche department
