= Tanis, Manche =

Tanis
- Commune
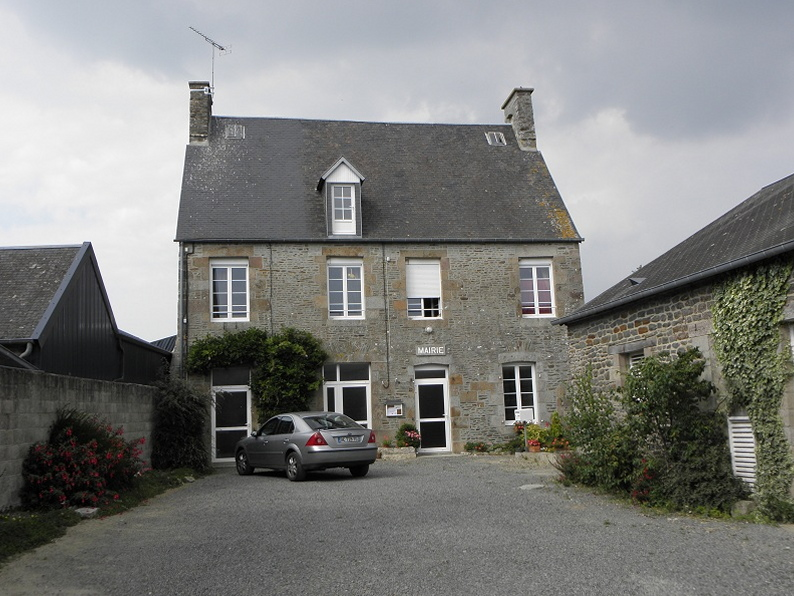
- Town hall
- Location of Tanis
- Location within France Location within Normandy
- Coordinates: 48°35′34″N 1°26′26″W
- Country: France
- Region: Normandy
- Department: Manche
- Arrondissement: Avranches
- Canton: Pontorson
- Intercommunality: CA Mont-Saint-Michel-Normandie

Government
  - Mayor (2020–2026): Christine Julienne
- Area^{1}: 7.49 km^{2} (2.89 sq mi)
- Elevation: 10 m (33 ft)
- Highest elevation: 51 m (167 ft)
- Lowest elevation: 7 m (23 ft)
- Population (2023): 268
  - Density: 35.8/km^{2} (92.7/sq mi)
- Time zone: UTC+01:00 (CET)
  - Summer (DST): UTC+02:00 (CEST)
- INSEE/Postal code: 50589 /50170
- ^{1} French Land Register data, which excludes lakes, ponds, glaciers > 1 km^{2} (0.386 sq mi or 247 acres) and river estuaries.

Tanis is a commune in the Manche department in Normandy in north-western France.

== See also ==
- Communes of the Manche department
