= Ducey, Manche =

Commune in Manche, France

Ducey
- Part of Ducey-Les Chéris
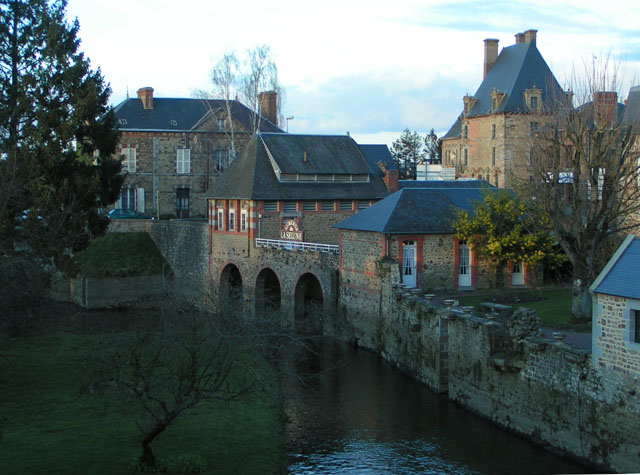
- The Sélune at Ducey

- Coat of arms
- Location of Ducey
- Location within France Location within Normandy
- Coordinates: 48°37′12″N 1°17′17″W
- Country: France
- Region: Normandy
- Department: Manche
- Arrondissement: Avranches
- Canton: Pontorson
- Commune: Ducey-Les Chéris
- Area^{1}: 11.21 km^{2} (4.33 sq mi)
- Elevation: 15 m (49 ft)
- Highest elevation: 113 m (371 ft)
- Lowest elevation: 6 m (20 ft)
- Population (2022): 2,572
  - Density: 229.4/km^{2} (594.2/sq mi)
- Demonym: Ducéens
- Time zone: UTC+01:00 (CET)
  - Summer (DST): UTC+02:00 (CEST)
- Postal code: 50220
- ^{1} French Land Register data, which excludes lakes, ponds, glaciers > 1 km^{2} (0.386 sq mi or 247 acres) and river estuaries.

Ducey (French pronunciation: [dysɛ]) is a former commune in the Manche department in north-western France. On 1 January 2016, it was merged into the new commune of Ducey-Les Chéris. It is noted for its old bridge dating from 1613, which allowed pilgrims to cross the Sélune on the way to Mont Saint-Michel.

The commune is listed as a Village étape.

== See also ==
- Communes of the Manche department
