= Battle of Orthez (1569) =

1569 battle

Battle of Orthez 1569
- Part of the French Wars of Religion
Date	11-15 August 1569
Location	France 43.49°N 0.77°W
Result	Huguenot victory

Belligerents
Huguenots	Kingdom of France

Commanders and leaders
Gabriel de Lorges, Count of Montgomery	Terride

Strength
c. 2,500	

The Battle of Orthez was fought during the French Wars of Religion, between 11 and 14 August 1569. Huguenot forces under the leadership of Gabriel de Lorges, Count of Montgomery defeated Royalist forces under Antoine de Lomagne, vicomte de Terride in French Navarre. Following the battle, Huguenot forces killed many of their Catholic prisoners.

== Background ==
In the latter half of the sixteenth century, all Aquitaine above the Garonne except for Bordeaux was in Protestant hands. At that time, Orthez was the largest and most dynamic city of Béarn. It was a market town which served as the main funnel for products making their way to Bayonne for export. Orthez was therefore quite wealthy. One wealthy Protestant, Adrien-Arnaud de Gachassin, had gifted his mansion in Orthez to Jeanne d'Albret in 1555 (today, it is called the Maison of Jeanne d'Albret and has become a museum of how wealthy Protestants lived). The Huguenots were therefore desirous of capturing the important and wealthy town of Orthez.

== Forces ==
The Huguenot army of Gabriel de Lorges, Count of Montgomery was a highly mobile force of 2,500, with a large proportion of cavalry.

== En route to Orthez ==
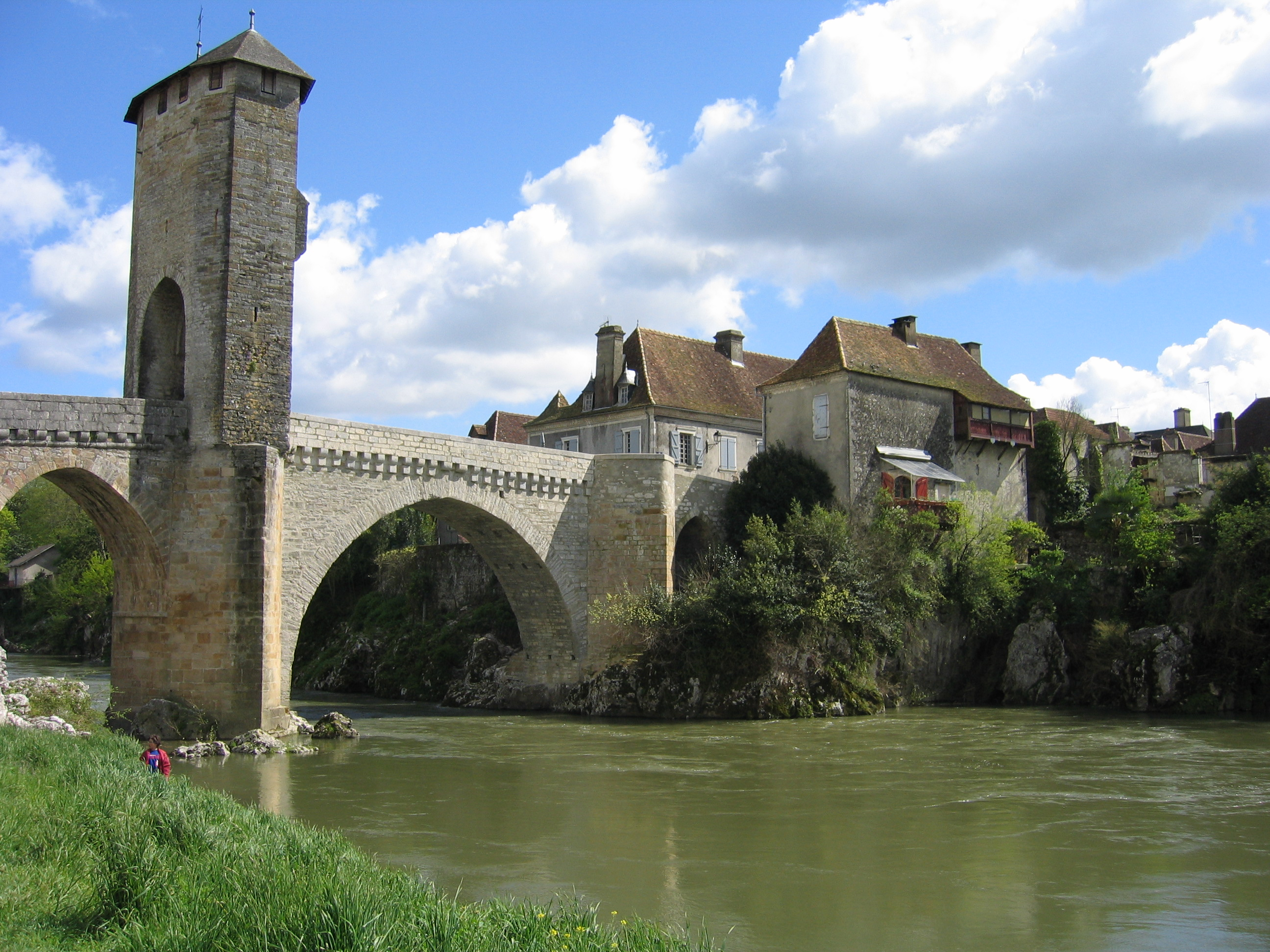
Le Pont-Vieux over the Gave de Pau in Orthez. The opening in the parapet of the bridge is the point from which the Catholic priests of Orthez were thrown to their deaths during the massacre.

The Protestant forces of Gabriel, comte de Montgomery and Montamat had left Castres around noon on 27 July 1569. They pillaged along the way, passing through Mazères in Foix. The troops crossed the Garonne and the Gave at Coarreze and by 9 August, they reached Queen Jeanne d'Albret's castle at Navarrenx, which had been placed under siege two and a half months ago by the Catholic army of Antoine de Lomagne, vicomte de Terride. Terride, who had lifted the siege the previous day, withdrew his forces to Orthez.

On 11 August, Montgomery crossed the Gave de Pau under fire and routed Terride's troops on the right bank. Isolated in Orthez and despairing of relief, Terride opened negotiations on 14 August.

In the following days, the Huguenots killed many of their prisoners. A special death was contrived for the clergy – they were thrown to their deaths from the heights of Orthez's Le Pont-Vieux over the Gave de Pau. In addition, the local Moncade castle was destroyed as well as the town's churches and many homes.

== Aftermath ==
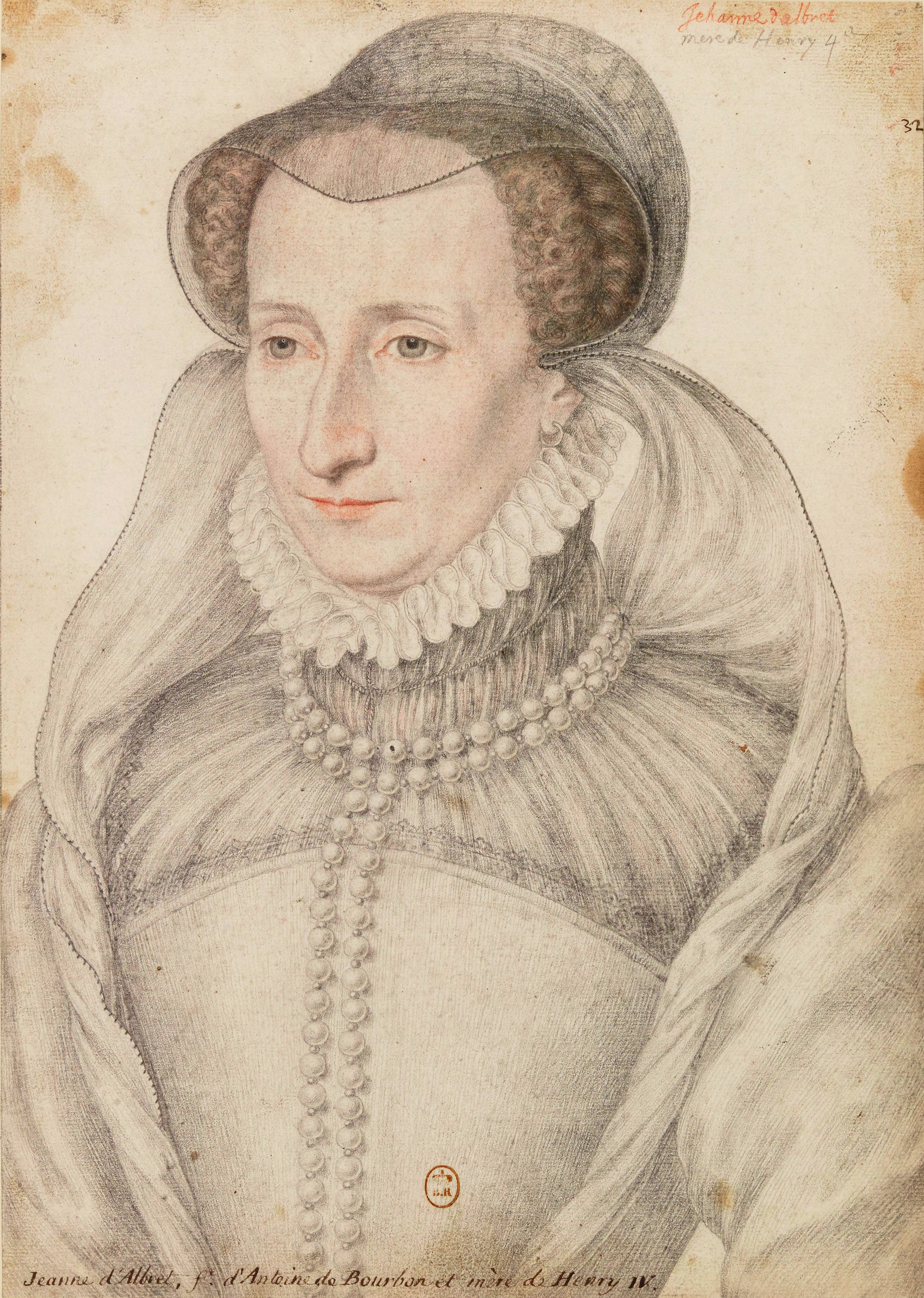
Jeanne d'Albret, a leading Huguenot figure.

Massacres of religious opponents characterised much of the Wars of Religion. Gabriel, comte de Montgomery's Huguenot troops committed subsequent massacres of Catholics in Artix, Tarbes, and elsewhere.

Based on correspondence and the memoirs of Jeanne d'Albret, as well as the fact that the war was taken specifically to Orthez and Navarrenx by her direct orders, the historian Communay posits that she herself may have ordered the slaughter of the Catholic prisoners. Doubtless, however, the Huguenots were so enraged by the persecution inflicted on them by the Catholics that they could not be restrained from the massacre.

Montgomery's victory at Orthez gave the Huguenots the ability to recover after, in October, their main field army was destroyed at Moncontour.
