= Crollon =

- Commune
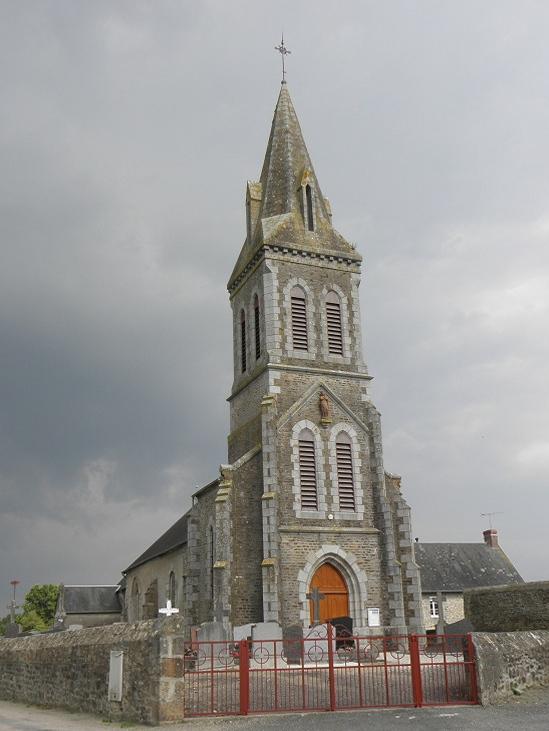
- The parish church of Crollon
- Location of Crollon
- Location within France Location within Normandy
- Coordinates: 48°35′09″N 1°22′59″W
- Country: France
- Region: Normandy
- Department: Manche
- Arrondissement: Avranches
- Canton: Pontorson
- Intercommunality: CA Mont-Saint-Michel-Normandie

Government
  - Mayor (2020–2026): Noël Bouvier
- Area^{1}: 4.68 km^{2} (1.81 sq mi)
- Elevation: 25 m (82 ft)
- Highest elevation: 80 m (260 ft)
- Lowest elevation: 24 m (79 ft)
- Population (2023): 301
  - Density: 64.3/km^{2} (167/sq mi)
- Time zone: UTC+01:00 (CET)
  - Summer (DST): UTC+02:00 (CEST)
- INSEE/Postal code: 50155 /50220
- ^{1} French Land Register data, which excludes lakes, ponds, glaciers > 1 km^{2} (0.386 sq mi or 247 acres) and river estuaries.

Crollon (French pronunciation: [kʁɔlɔ̃]) is a commune in the Manche department in Normandy in north-western France. It had 298 inhabitants as of 2022. Historically, Crollon has ranged in size from a maximum of 500 inhabitants in 1821 to a minimum of 183 in 1982. The current mayor is Noël Bouvier, elected in 2020.

== See also ==
- Communes of the Manche department
