= Céaux =

- Commune
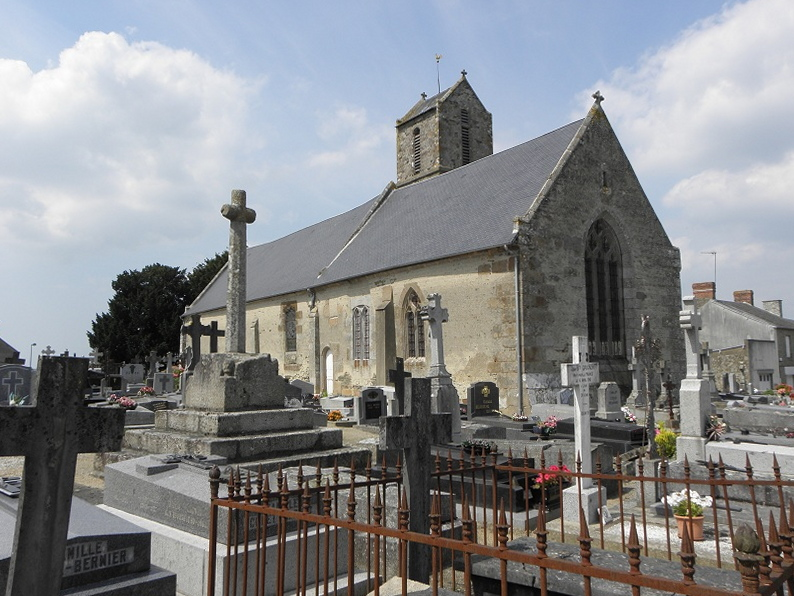
- The church of Saint-Cyr-et-Sainte-Julitte

- Coat of arms
- Location of Céaux
- Location within France Location within Normandy
- Coordinates: 48°37′57″N 1°23′10″W
- Country: France
- Region: Normandy
- Department: Manche
- Arrondissement: Avranches
- Canton: Pontorson
- Intercommunality: CA Mont-Saint-Michel-Normandie

Government
  - Mayor (2020–2026): Christophe Hernot
- Area^{1}: 8.39 km^{2} (3.24 sq mi)
- Elevation: 20 m (66 ft)
- Highest elevation: 71 m (233 ft)
- Lowest elevation: 5 m (16 ft)
- Population (2023): 414
  - Density: 49.3/km^{2} (128/sq mi)
- Time zone: UTC+01:00 (CET)
  - Summer (DST): UTC+02:00 (CEST)
- INSEE/Postal code: 50108 /50220
- ^{1} French Land Register data, which excludes lakes, ponds, glaciers > 1 km^{2} (0.386 sq mi or 247 acres) and river estuaries.

Céaux (French pronunciation: [seo]) is a commune in the Manche department in Normandy in north-western France.

== See also ==
- Communes of the Manche department
