= Saint-Ovin =

- Commune
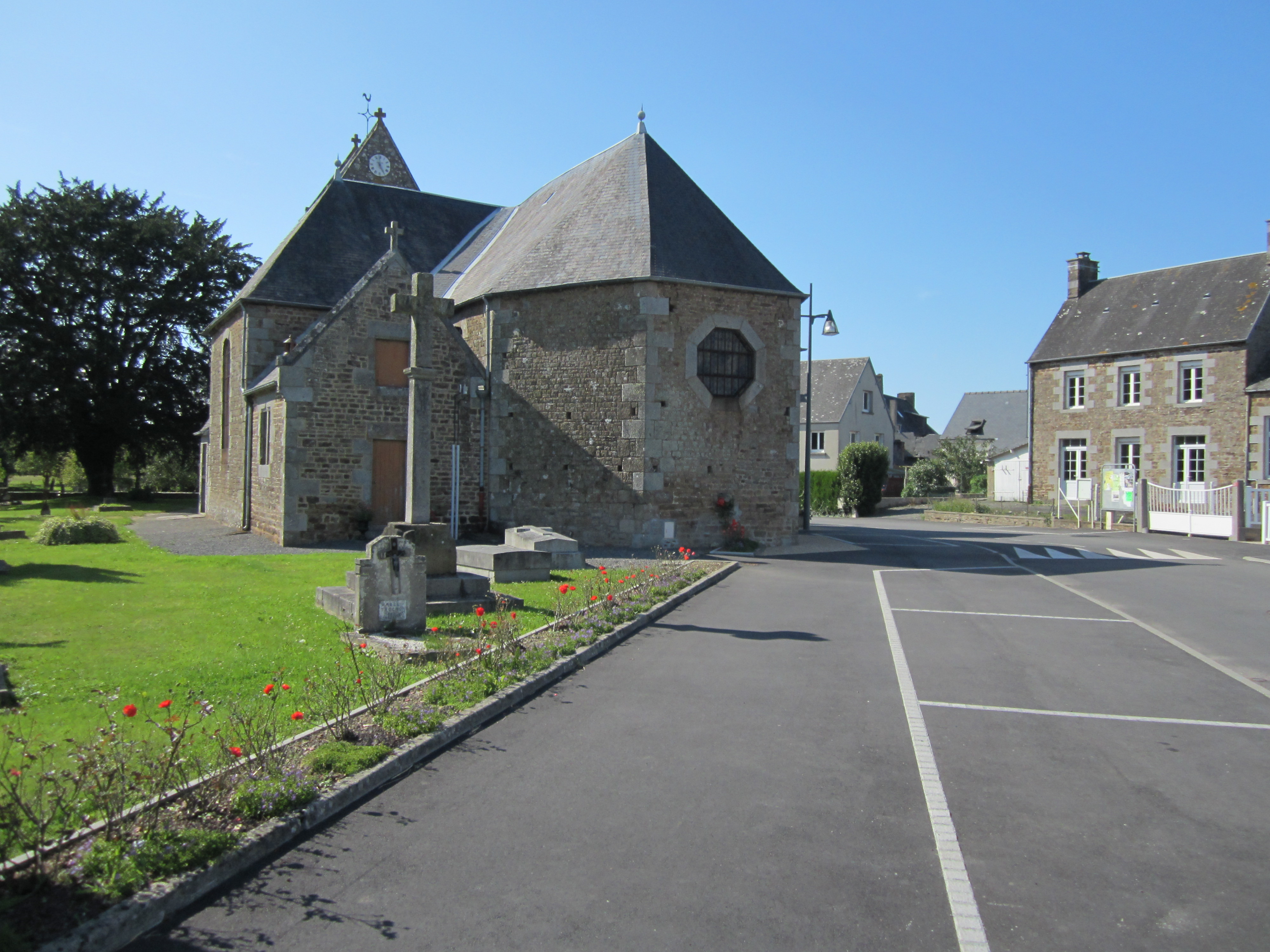
- View of the village and Saint Ouen church
- Location of Saint-Ovin
- Location within France Location within Normandy
- Coordinates: 48°40′56″N 1°15′37″W
- Country: France
- Region: Normandy
- Department: Manche
- Arrondissement: Avranches
- Canton: Pontorson
- Intercommunality: CA Mont-Saint-Michel-Normandie

Government
  - Mayor (2020–2026): Christian Poulain
- Area^{1}: 12.93 km^{2} (4.99 sq mi)
- Elevation: 135 m (443 ft)
- Highest elevation: 193 m (633 ft)
- Lowest elevation: 36 m (118 ft)
- Population (2023): 762
  - Density: 58.9/km^{2} (153/sq mi)
- Time zone: UTC+01:00 (CET)
  - Summer (DST): UTC+02:00 (CEST)
- INSEE/Postal code: 50531 /50300
- ^{1} French Land Register data, which excludes lakes, ponds, glaciers > 1 km^{2} (0.386 sq mi or 247 acres) and river estuaries.

Saint-Ovin (French pronunciation: [sɛ̃.t‿ɔvɛ̃]) is a commune in the Manche department in Normandy in north-western France.

== See also ==
- Communes of the Manche department
