= Servon, Manche =

Servon
- Commune
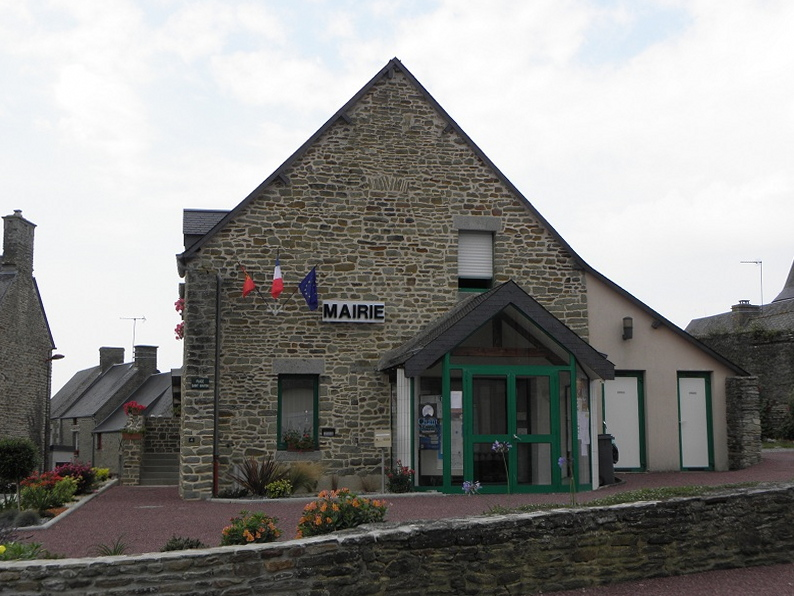
- The town hall
- Location of Servon
- Location within France Location within Normandy
- Coordinates: 48°36′05″N 1°25′03″W
- Country: France
- Region: Normandy
- Department: Manche
- Arrondissement: Avranches
- Canton: Pontorson
- Intercommunality: CA Mont-Saint-Michel-Normandie

Government
  - Mayor (2020–2026): Daniel Furcy
- Area^{1}: 9.23 km^{2} (3.56 sq mi)
- Elevation: 20 m (66 ft)
- Highest elevation: 48 m (157 ft)
- Lowest elevation: 6 m (20 ft)
- Population (2023): 252
  - Density: 27.3/km^{2} (70.7/sq mi)
- Time zone: UTC+01:00 (CET)
  - Summer (DST): UTC+02:00 (CEST)
- INSEE/Postal code: 50574 /50170
- ^{1} French Land Register data, which excludes lakes, ponds, glaciers > 1 km^{2} (0.386 sq mi or 247 acres) and river estuaries.

Servon (French pronunciation: [sɛʁvɔ̃]) is a commune in the Manche department in Normandy in north-western France.

== See also ==
- Communes of the Manche department
