= Pontorson =

- Commune
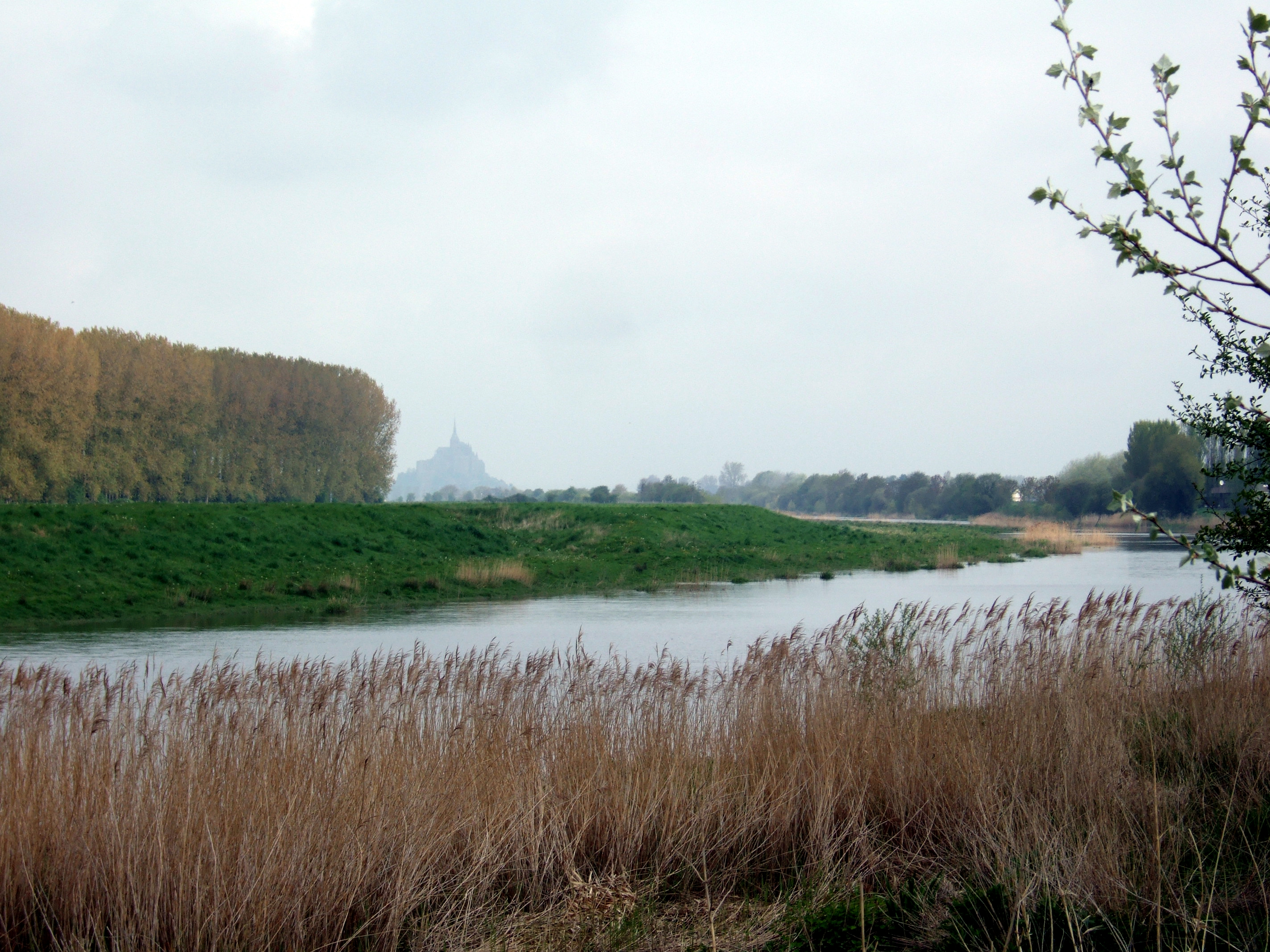
- The Mont Saint-Michel seen from the town's outskirts

- Coat of arms
- Location of Pontorson
- Location within France Location within Normandy
- Coordinates: 48°33′12″N 1°30′24″W
- Country: France
- Region: Normandy
- Department: Manche
- Arrondissement: Avranches
- Canton: Pontorson
- Intercommunality: CA Mont-Saint-Michel-Normandie

Government
  - Mayor (2020–2026): André-Jean Belloir
- Area^{1}: 61.47 km^{2} (23.73 sq mi)
- Elevation: 18 m (59 ft)
- Highest elevation: 73 m (240 ft)
- Lowest elevation: 5 m (16 ft)
- Population (2023): 4,280
  - Density: 69.6/km^{2} (180/sq mi)
- Time zone: UTC+01:00 (CET)
  - Summer (DST): UTC+02:00 (CEST)
- INSEE/Postal code: 50410 /50170
- ^{1} French Land Register data, which excludes lakes, ponds, glaciers > 1 km^{2} (0.386 sq mi or 247 acres) and river estuaries.

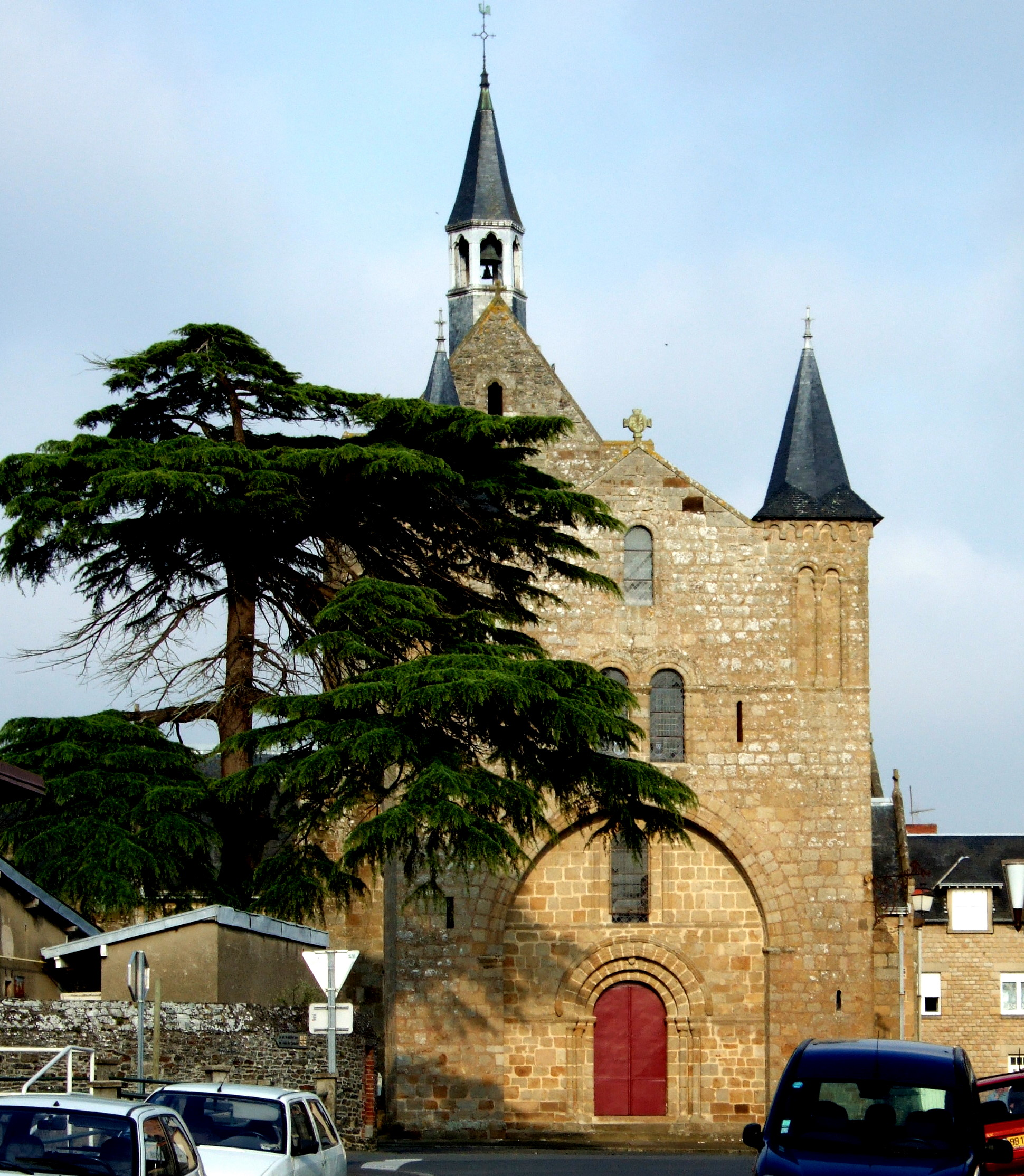
The church Notre-Dame de Pontorson.

Pontorson (French pronunciation: [pɔ̃tɔʁsɔ̃]) is a commune in the Manche department in north-western France.

== Geography ==
Pontorson is situated about 10 kilometres from the Mont Saint-Michel, to which it is connected by highway and a walking path along the river Couesnon. The river also gives its name to the town's main street.

=== Climate ===
Pontorson has an oceanic climate (Köppen climate classification Cfb). The average annual temperature in Pontorson is 11.8 °C (53.2 °F). The average annual rainfall is 838.6 mm (33.02 in) with October as the wettest month. The temperatures are highest on average in August, at around 18.1 °C (64.6 °F), and lowest in January, at around 5.9 °C (42.6 °F). The highest temperature ever recorded in Pontorson was 39.0 °C (102.2 °F) on 5 August 2003; the coldest temperature ever recorded was −8.0 °C (17.6 °F) on 11 February 2012.

Climate data for Pontorson (1981–2010 averages, extremes 1997−present)
Month	Jan	Feb	Mar	Apr	May	Jun	Jul	Aug	Sep	Oct	Nov	Dec	Year
Record high °C (°F)	15.4 (59.7)	21.2 (70.2)	24.2 (75.6)	28.0 (82.4)	29.7 (85.5)	35.6 (96.1)	38.7 (101.7)	39.0 (102.2)	33.4 (92.1)	28.9 (84.0)	21.6 (70.9)	16.8 (62.2)	39.0 (102.2)
Mean daily maximum °C (°F)	8.6 (47.5)	9.7 (49.5)	12.4 (54.3)	15.0 (59.0)	18.4 (65.1)	21.4 (70.5)	22.8 (73.0)	22.9 (73.2)	21.1 (70.0)	16.8 (62.2)	12.0 (53.6)	8.7 (47.7)	15.8 (60.4)
Daily mean °C (°F)	5.9 (42.6)	6.4 (43.5)	8.3 (46.9)	10.3 (50.5)	13.7 (56.7)	16.5 (61.7)	18.0 (64.4)	18.1 (64.6)	16.0 (60.8)	13.0 (55.4)	8.9 (48.0)	5.8 (42.4)	11.8 (53.2)
Mean daily minimum °C (°F)	3.1 (37.6)	3.1 (37.6)	4.3 (39.7)	5.6 (42.1)	9.0 (48.2)	11.6 (52.9)	13.2 (55.8)	13.3 (55.9)	11.0 (51.8)	9.2 (48.6)	5.9 (42.6)	2.9 (37.2)	7.7 (45.9)
Record low °C (°F)	−7.8 (18.0)	−8.0 (17.6)	−5.6 (21.9)	−2.9 (26.8)	−1.2 (29.8)	3.6 (38.5)	5.2 (41.4)	4.7 (40.5)	1.3 (34.3)	−5.0 (23.0)	−6.2 (20.8)	−7.2 (19.0)	−8.0 (17.6)
Average precipitation mm (inches)	141.4 (5.57)	98.4 (3.87)	94.2 (3.71)	73.7 (2.90)	66.1 (2.60)	63.4 (2.50)	63.0 (2.48)	69.7 (2.74)	91.1 (3.59)	142.0 (5.59)	147.6 (5.81)	157.3 (6.19)	1,207.9 (47.56)
Average precipitation days (≥ 1.0 mm)	16.4	12.7	12.6	10.8	9.5	8.1	8.9	8.9	10.7	14.9	16.6	16.2	137.5
Source: Meteociel

== History ==
The town was founded in the 12th century after a vow by William the Conqueror. It was home to a fortress, which was razed to the ground in 1623 by order of King Louis XIII.

During World War II, after the liberation of the area by Allied Forces in 1944, engineers of the Ninth Air Force IX Engineering Command began construction of a combat Advanced Landing Ground outside of the town. Declared operational on 10 August, the airfield was designated as "A-28", it was used by the 368th Fighter Group which flew P-47 Thunderbolts until early September when the unit moved into Central France. Afterward, the airfield was closed.

Frantz Fanon practiced psychiatry in Pontorson in the early 1950s.

In 1973 Pontorson absorbed seven former communes: Ardevon, Beauvoir (re-established in 1989), Boucey, Cormeray, Curey, Les Pas and Moidrey. On 1 January 2016, the former communes of Macey and Vessey were merged into Pontorson. In 1990, Pontorson twinned with the town of Highworth in England.

== Population ==
Population data refer to the area corresponding with the commune as of January 2025.

Historical population
Year	Pop.	±% p.a.
1968	5,749	—
1975	5,696	−0.13%
1982	5,534	−0.41%
1990	4,893	−1.53%
1999	4,602	−0.68%
2007	4,608	+0.02%
2012	4,584	−0.10%
2017	4,342	−1.08%
2023	4,280	−0.24%
Source: INSEE

== Main sights ==
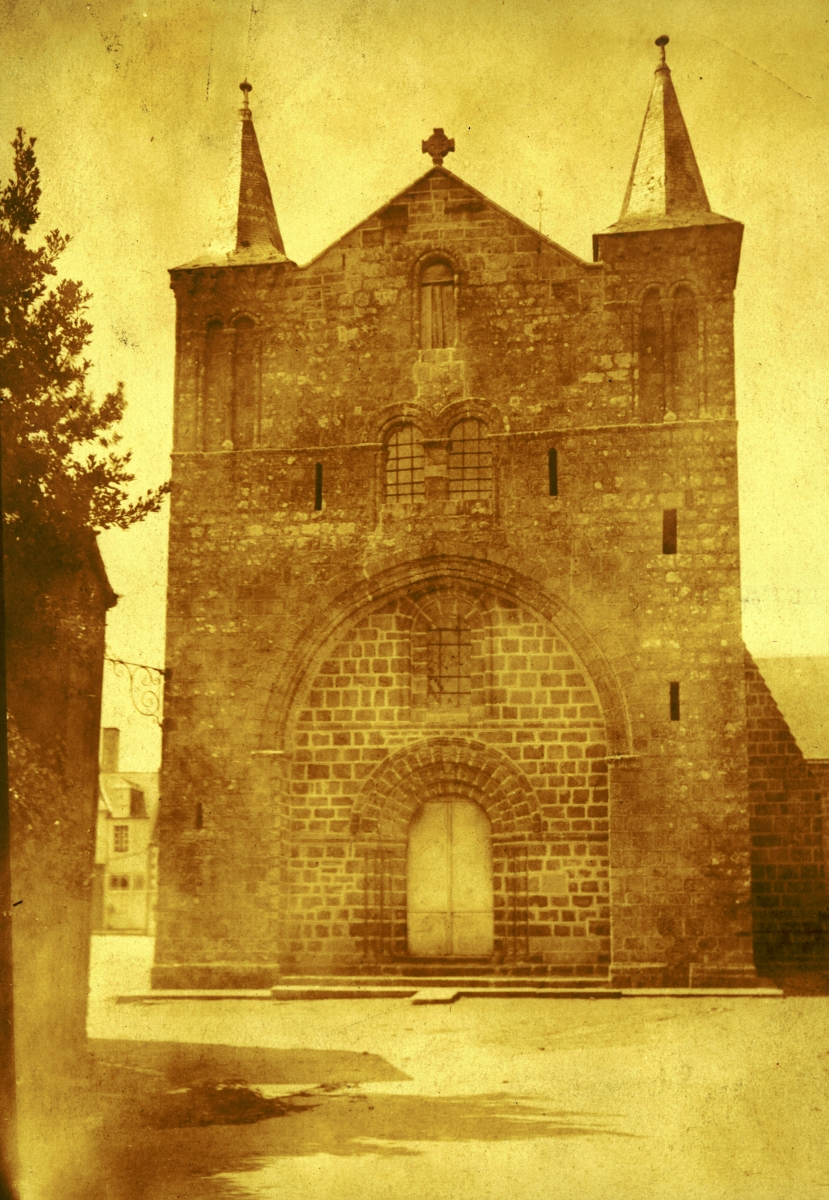
Notre Dame, Pontorson, France, n.d.. Photograph taken by A. Kingsley Porter. Façade of church. No date.

- Notre-Dame church, built between 1050 and 1150, with additions in the 15th century. It is in Romanesque-transition Gothic style; it has a massive appearance with a central portal, flanked by two towers.
- Old Protestant Temple (16th century)
- Guischard de la Ménardière house (also known as "Roman House", 11th-12th centuries)
- Residence of the counts of Montgomery

== Transportation ==
Pontorson is home to the nearest SNCF railway station to France's second most popular tourist attraction, Mont-Saint-Michel.

Despite the town's role as a tourist gateway, train services are relatively rare, about three or four per day.

== See also ==
- Communes of the Manche department
