= Saint-Quentin-sur-le-Homme =

- Commune
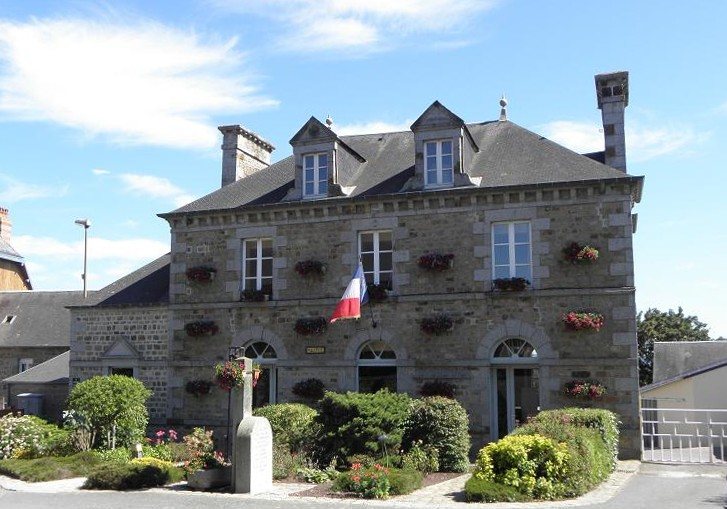
- Town hall
- Location of Saint-Quentin-sur-le-Homme
- Location within France Location within Normandy
- Coordinates: 48°38′53″N 1°18′56″W
- Country: France
- Region: Normandy
- Department: Manche
- Arrondissement: Avranches
- Canton: Pontorson
- Intercommunality: CA Mont-Saint-Michel-Normandie

Government
  - Mayor (2020–2026): Stephane Grall
- Area^{1}: 16.84 km^{2} (6.50 sq mi)
- Elevation: 55 m (180 ft)
- Highest elevation: 95 m (312 ft)
- Lowest elevation: 6 m (20 ft)
- Population (2023): 1,338
  - Density: 79.45/km^{2} (205.8/sq mi)
- Time zone: UTC+01:00 (CET)
  - Summer (DST): UTC+02:00 (CEST)
- INSEE/Postal code: 50543 /50220
- ^{1} French Land Register data, which excludes lakes, ponds, glaciers > 1 km^{2} (0.386 sq mi or 247 acres) and river estuaries.

Saint-Quentin-sur-le-Homme (French pronunciation: [sɛ̃ kɑ̃tɛ̃ syʁ lə ɔm]) is a commune in the Manche department in Normandy in north-western France.

== See also ==
- Communes of the Manche department
