= Avranches–Saint-James tramway =

Railway line in France

Coordinates: 48.68511795501748°N 1.3561732073836121°W

Avranches–Saint-James
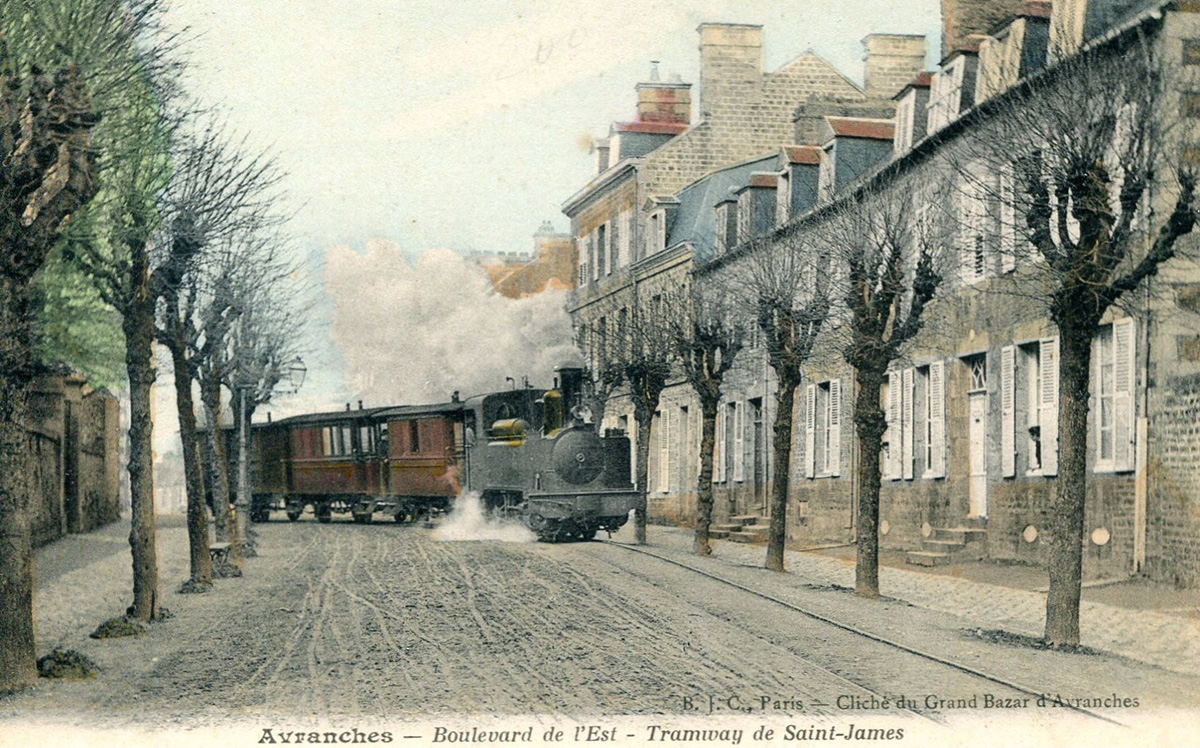
- Boulevard de l'Est in Avranches (now Boulevard de l’Amiral-Gauchet)

Technical
- Line length: 17 km (11 mi)
- Track gauge: 1,000 mm (3 ft 3 3/8 in)
- Operating speed: 20 km/h (12 mph)
Route map
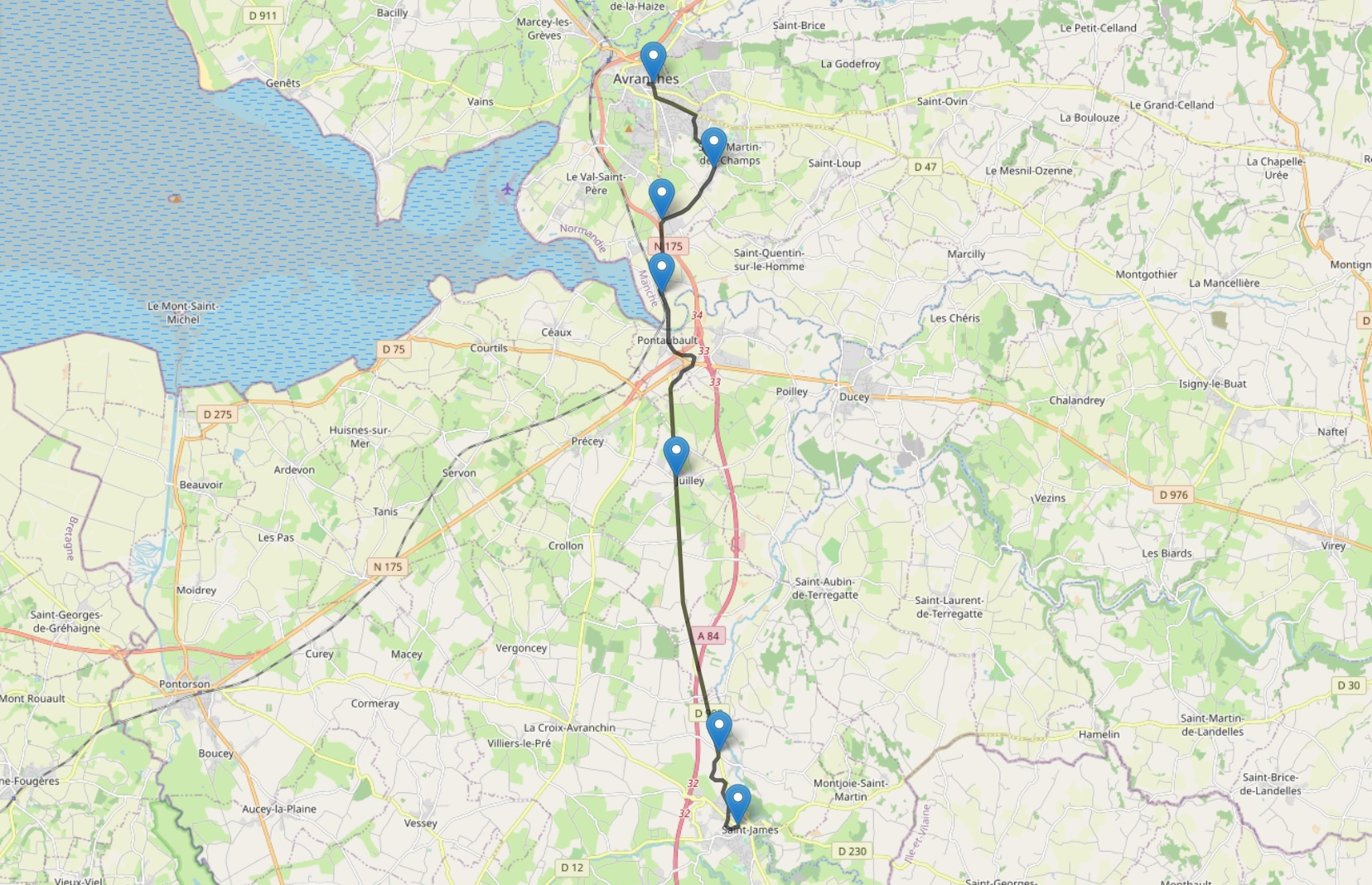

The Avranches–Saint-James tramway was a 17 kilometres (11 miles) metre gauge railway on the English Channel in the Manche département in the Normandy region of France, which was put into service on 29 July 1901 and operated until 31 December 1933.

== Right of way concession ==
President Émile Loubet authorised on 8 June 1899 the construction of the secondary railway line, to be operated by locomotives. Earlier, on 18 May 1899, the prefect of the Manche department had signed an agreement with the brothers Paul and Edmond Beldant and François Baërt, a public works contractor in Le Mans, to build and operate the line and, in particular, to transfer the tramway back when the concession expired.

The department had to finance the procurement of two locomotives, eight passenger wagons, two closed freight wagons and twelve open freight wagons, subject to being returned at the end of the concession, and provided the area of public roads of each category required for the substructure of the line and its ancillary facilities free of charge. A fixed-price agreement defined the rates for the infrastructure (studies, land and works), the superstructure (tracks, fixed material and stations) and the rolling stock.

According to the specifications, the tramway was to be run on the following public roads: Boulevard du Sud in Avranches, Chemin de Grande Communication No. 47, National Road No. 176 and Chemin de Grande Communication No. 12. The following stations or stops were to be established for passenger services: Avranches-Est (station), Saint-Martin-Saint-Quentin (stop), Pontaubault (station, connection to the western line), Bourg de Pontaubault (stop), Le Vey (stop), Juilley (station), Le Haut-de-la-Lande (stop), Saint-Senier-de-Beuvron (station), Saint-James (station).

The gauge was to be 1,000 mm (3 ft 3 3/8 in), the minimum number of journeys per day was fixed to three in each direction, a train could have no more than twelve carriages, be no longer than 60 metres (200 feet) and its speed could be no more than 20 km/h (12 mph).

== Operation ==
The local railway was put into service by the Compagnie des Tramways Normands (TN) on 29 July 1901, the same day as the line from Pontorson to Mont-Saint-Michel.

In the aftermath of World War I, the General Council of the Manche department questioned the future viability of the local railway in 1921 and took over the network in 1926. In 1928, the Compagnie des Tramways Normands (TN) handed over the operation to the Société des Chemins de Fer de la Manche (CFM).

The line was closed in 1933. In May 1938, it was declassified by the Conseil général de la Manche and had to be dismantled.

== Route ==
The metre-gauge line started at Avranches-Est station on Boulevard de l'Est (now Place du Tramway on Boulevard de l'Amiral-Gauchet), where there was an interchange with the electric tramway between 1907 and 1914. The line was 17 km (11 mi) long, or 21.117 km (13.121 mi) including the electrically operated connecting line of the Tramway d'Avranches.

It ran via Saint-Martin-des-Champs, where the railway embankment is still visible in the valley of La Bourdonnière, via Saint-Quentin-sur-le-Homme in Le Grand-Chien to Pontaubault, where it crossed the Sélune on the stone bridge that still exists today. There, it was possible to change to Dol-de-Bretagne (Ille-et-Vilaine) or Saint-Lô or Saint-Hilaire-du-Harcouët.

After passing Juilley and Saint-Senier-de-Beuvron in La Croisette, the route ended in Saint-James.

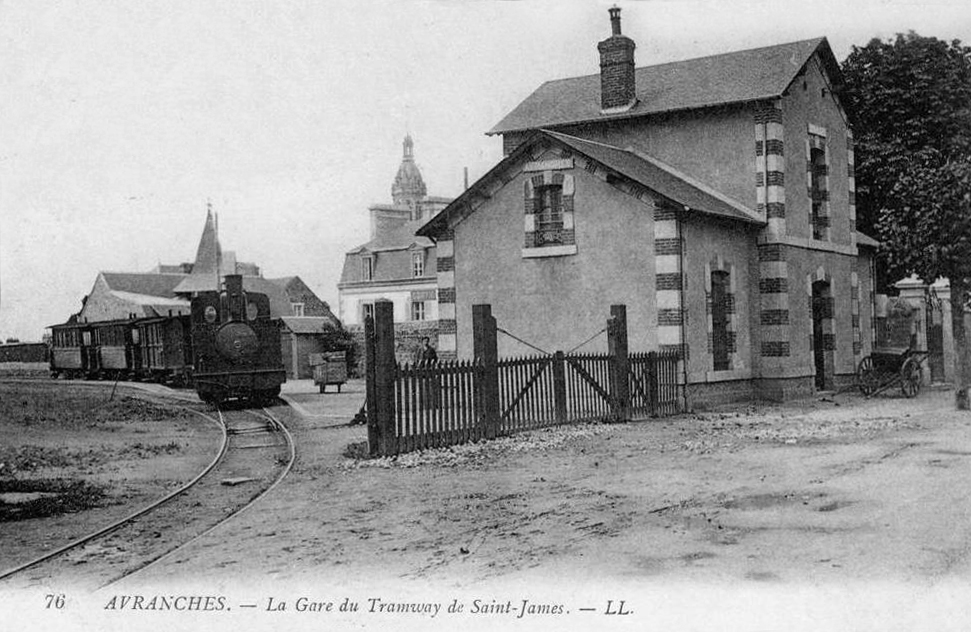
Terminus Avranches-Est

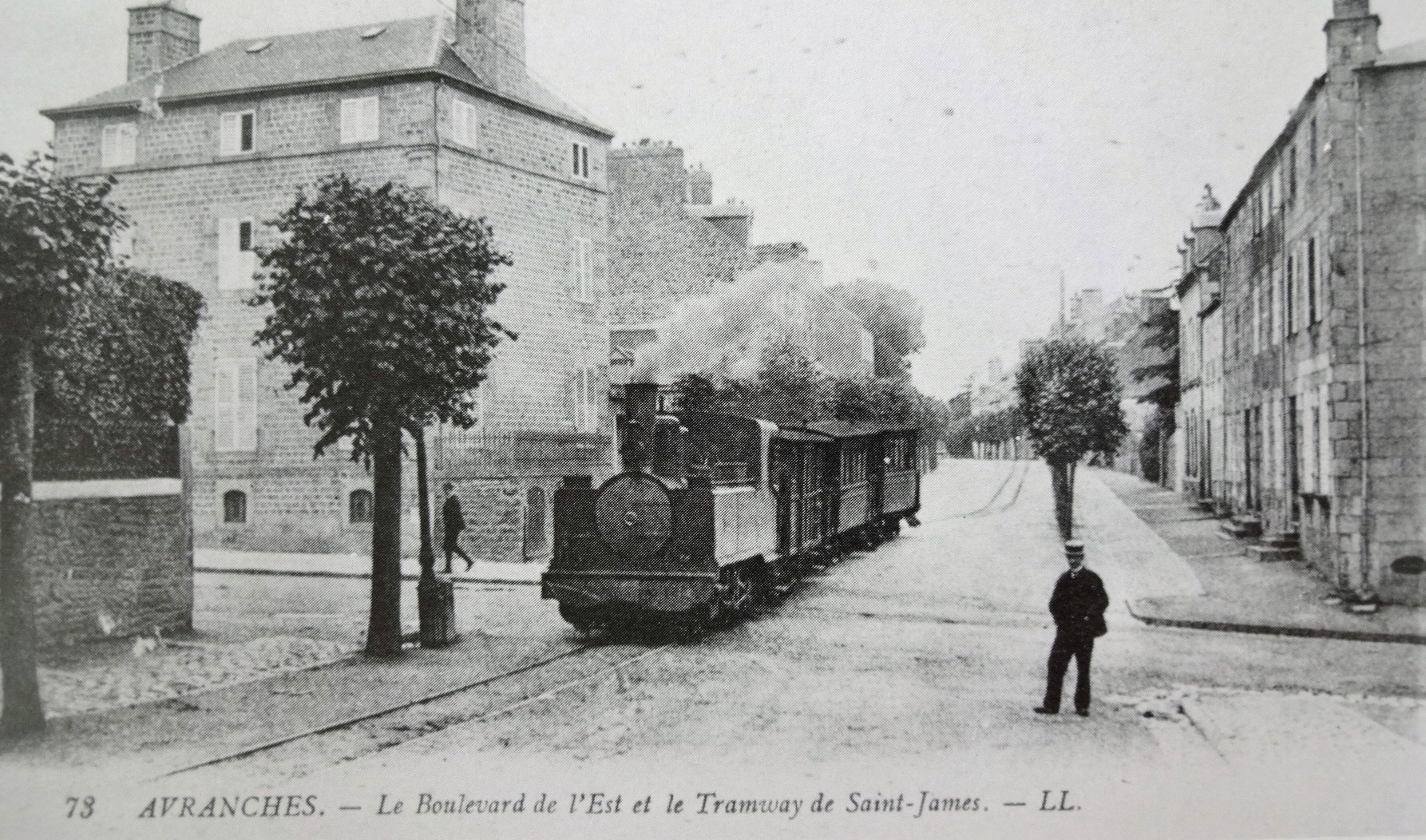
Le Boulevard de l'Est in Avranches

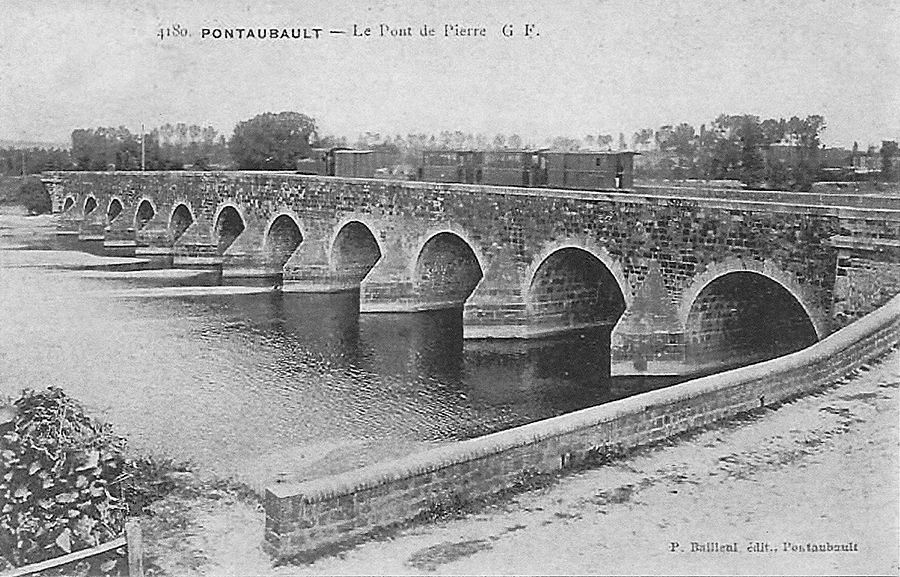
Bridge over the Sélune in Pontaubault

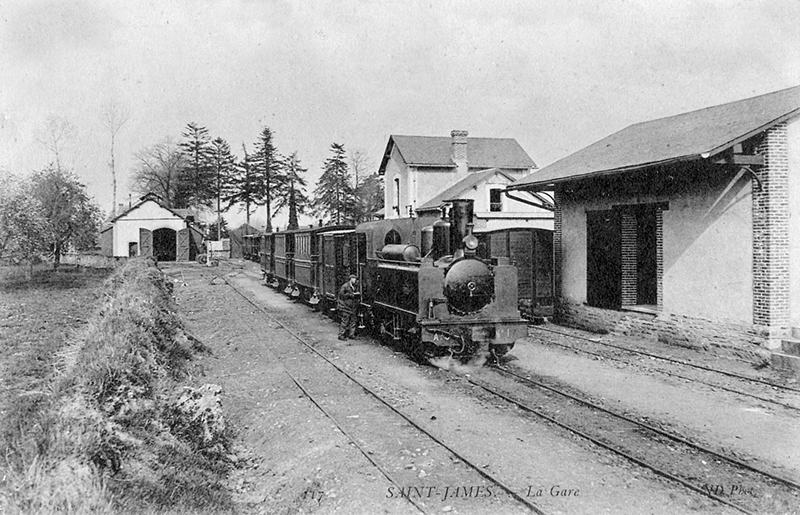
Terminus Saint-James
