= Sélune =

River in France

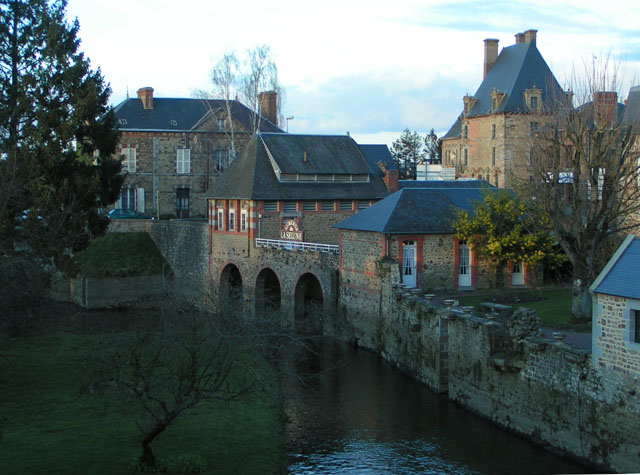
- The Selune at Ducey

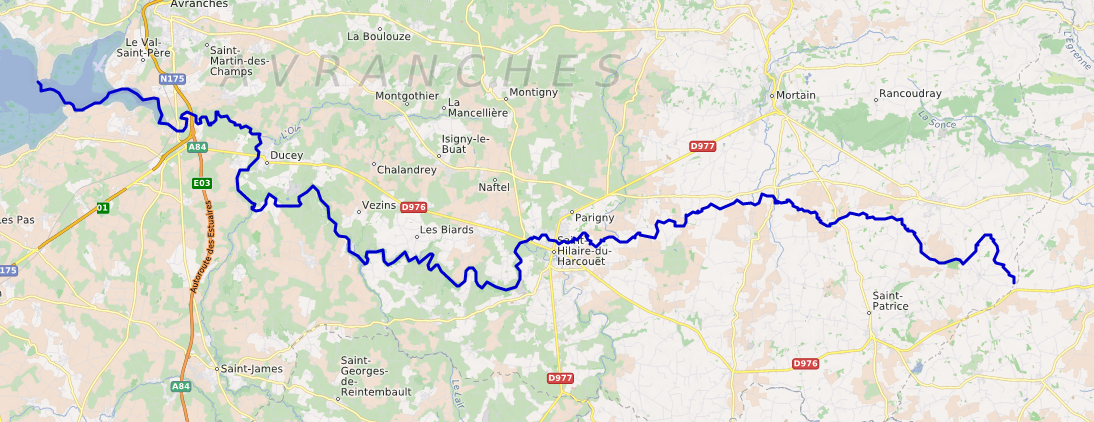

Location
- Country: France

Physical characteristics
- Source
  - location: Normandy
- Mouth
  - location: English Channel
  - coordinates: 48°38′51″N 1°23′53″W
- Length: 85 km (53 mi)
- Discharge
  - average: 11 m3/s

The Sélune (French pronunciation: [selyn]) is an 85 km long river in the Manche department, Normandy, France, beginning near Saint-Cyr-du-Bailleul. It empties into the bay of Mont Saint-Michel (part of the English Channel) near Avranches, close to the mouth of the Sée river. Other towns along the Sélune are Barenton, Saint-Hilaire-du-Harcouët and Ducey.

The Sélune river previously had 2 hydroelectric dams, the Vezine dams, installed from 1914 until 2023 when their dismantling was complete. The river has been subsequently re-establishing itself and some trout were rapidly found upstream from the dismantled dams.
