= Canton of Pontorson =

Administrative district in France

Coordinates: 48.55°N 1.51°W

The canton of Pontorson is an administrative division of the Manche department, northwestern France. Its borders were modified at the French canton reorganisation which came into effect in March 2015. Its seat is in Pontorson.

It consists of the following communes:

1. Aucey-la-Plaine
2. Beauvoir
3. Céaux
4. Courtils
5. Crollon
6. Ducey-Les Chéris
7. Huisnes-sur-Mer
8. Juilley
9. Marcilly
10. Le Mesnil-Ozenne
11. Le Mont-Saint-Michel
12. Poilley
13. Pontaubault
14. Pontorson
15. Précey
16. Sacey
17. Saint-Ovin
18. Saint-Quentin-sur-le-Homme
19. Servon
20. Tanis
21. Le Val-Saint-Père
