= Route nationale 177 =

National road 177
- Route nationale 177

Location
- Country: France

Highway system
- Roads in France; Autoroutes; Routes nationales

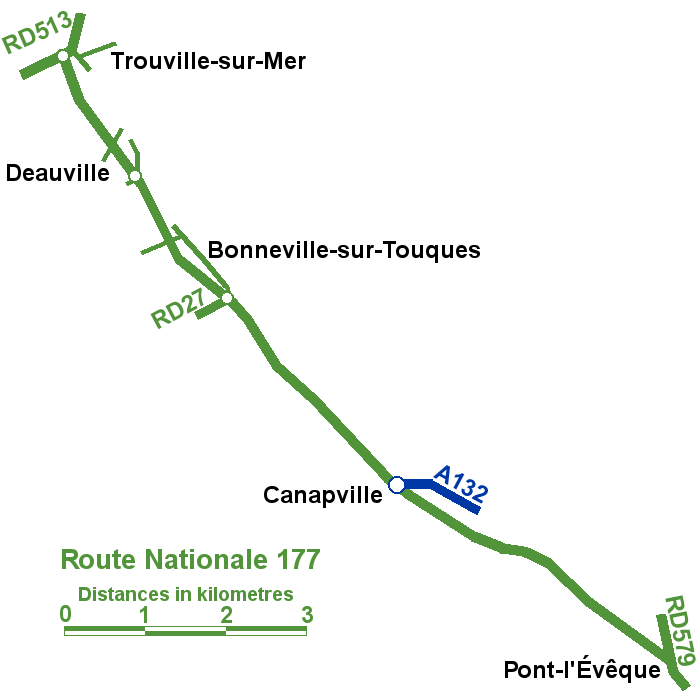
Plan of the RN177.

The RN177 is a trunk road (nationale) in France linking Pont-l'Évêque and Trouville-sur-Mer. The road is in fact a section of the former RN834. The RN177 was until the 1972 reclassification scheme a link between Villers-Bocage and Redon.

The old RN177 was declassified into RD577 in Calvados, RD977 in Manche and RD177 in Ille-et-Vilaine. The RN177 has since 2006 been declassified into the RD677.

In a strange move by the Calvados DDE, drivers wishing to reach Deauville and the Côte Fleurie are advise not to use the trunk road but to use the single carriageway RD27A that follows a similar course along the Lisieux-Deauville railway line. Weekend tourists are often caught in traffic jams on the A132 while wanting to join the RN177 as well as at Bonneville-sur-Touques roundabout where several départementales converge. It is also at that location that the gendarmerie sets up speed cameras and alcohol control.

== Route ==
The road is bypassed by the A132 between Pont-l'Évêque and Canapville where the RN177 crosses several départementales and two level crossings. The section between the Bonneville-sur-Touques roundabout (where it meets the RD17 to Caen) and Deauville is a dual carriageway. The RN177 ends at a roundabout next to the gare de Trouville-Deauville where it meets the RD513.

It traverses the following communes:

- Pont-l'Évêque
- Coudray-Rabut
- Canapville
- Touques
- Trouville-sur-Mer
