= A132 autoroute =

Road in France

A132 autoroute

Route information
- Length: 5.3 km (3.3 mi)

Major junctions
- South end: D 579 / E46 / A 13 in Pont-l'Évêque

- North end: D 677 near Canapville

Location
- Country: France
- Major cities: Deauville

Highway system
- Roads in France; Autoroutes; Routes nationales

Autoroute A132 links the A13 and Deauville & Trouville-sur-Mer. It starts between exits 28 and 29a on the A13 and ends in the outskirts of Touques, just south of the village of Canapville on the N177.

The motorway is operated by the Société des Autoroutes de Paris Normandie (SAPN). Its total length is 5.3 km (3.3 mi) and is free. Junctions on the A132 are not numbered.

== List of junctions ==
Region	Department	km	mi	Junctions	Destinations	Notes
Normandie	Calvados	0.0	0.0	A13 - RD 579 - A132	Paris, Le Havre, Caen, Rouen, Lisieux, Pont-l'Évêque - Z. A	
Normandie	Calvados	1.1	0.68	1 : Pont-l'Évêque	Pont-l'Évêque, Lisieux	
Normandie	Calvados	2.7	1.7	2 : Tourville-en-Auge	Honfleur, Rouen, Le Havre, Lisieux, Pont-l'Evêque - centre, Tourville-en-Auge, Aéroport de Deauville-Normandie	
A 132 becomes D 677 / N 177
1.000 mi = 1.609 km; 1.000 km = 0.621 mi

Projects are afoot to extend the A132 to Deauville by circumventing Canapville to the West and by building the motorway along the railway line up to the station on the D513. A junction would be built on the D27 to link Dives-sur-Mer, Houlgate and Touques.

SAPN has a maintenance depot in Pont-l'Évêque along with the motorway French Gendarmerie.
