= Pont-l'Évêque, Calvados =

Pont-l'Évêque
- Commune
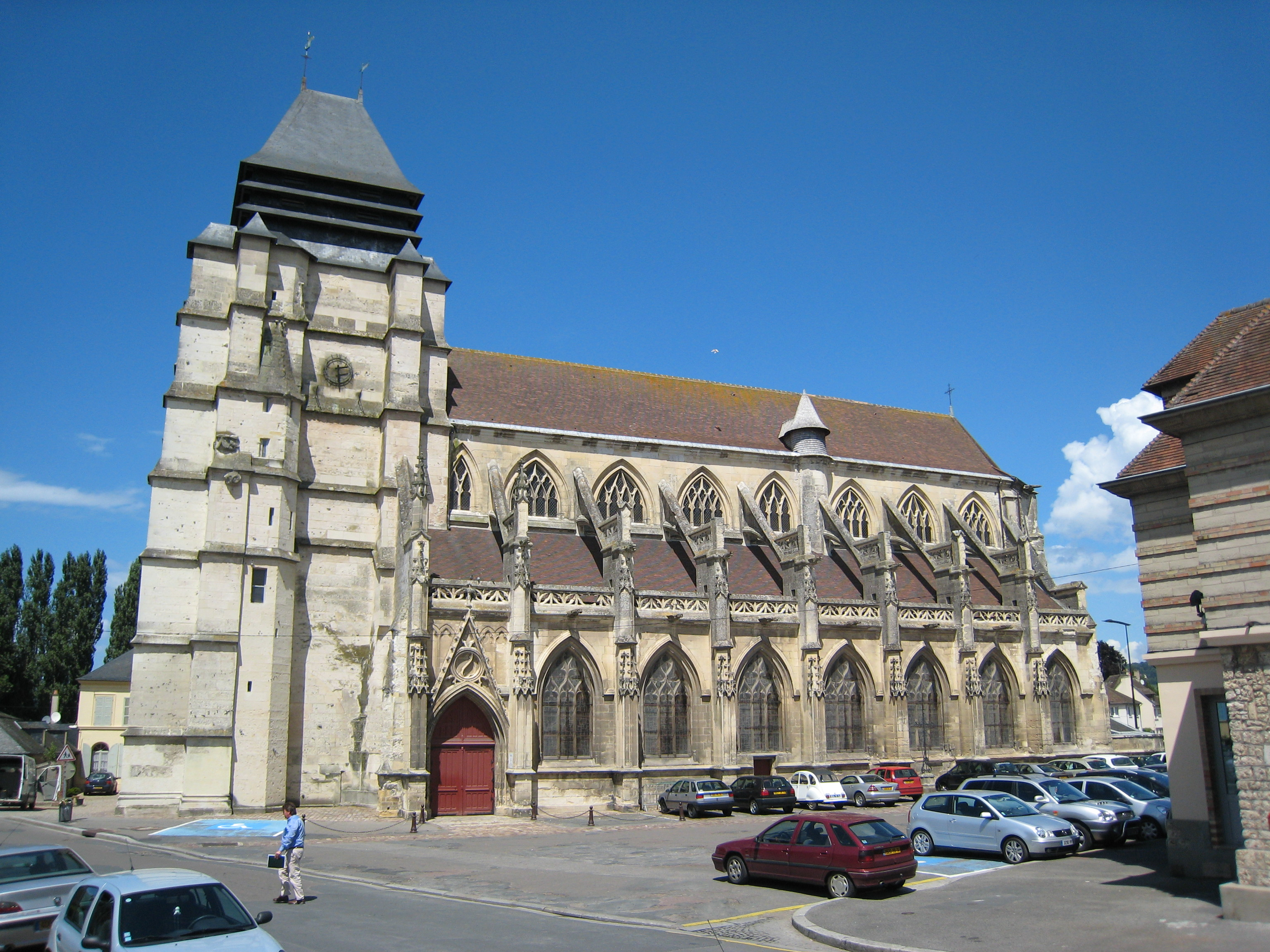
- Saint Michael's Church in Pont-l'Évêque

- Coat of arms
- Location of Pont-l'Évêque
- Location within France Location within Normandy
- Coordinates: 49°17′11″N 0°11′05″E
- Country: France
- Region: Normandy
- Department: Calvados
- Arrondissement: Lisieux
- Canton: Pont-l'Évêque
- Intercommunality: CC Terre d'Auge

Government
  - Mayor (2026–32): Jérémy Roseau
- Area^{1}: 12.98 km^{2} (5.01 sq mi)
- Elevation: 16 m (52 ft)
- Highest elevation: 148 m (486 ft)
- Lowest elevation: 5 m (16 ft)
- Population (2023): 5,145
  - Density: 396.4/km^{2} (1,027/sq mi)
- Time zone: UTC+01:00 (CET)
  - Summer (DST): UTC+02:00 (CEST)
- INSEE/Postal code: 14514 /14130
- ^{1} French Land Register data, which excludes lakes, ponds, glaciers > 1 km^{2} (0.386 sq mi or 247 acres) and river estuaries.

Pont-l'Évêque (French pronunciation: [pɔ̃ levɛːk]) is a commune in the Calvados department in the Normandy region in northwestern France. It is known for Pont-l'Évêque cheese, a type of soft cheese, the oldest Normandy cheese in production.

== History ==
In the summer of 1793, in the wake of the Montagnard seizure of power, the town called on neighboring villages to rise up against those who had imprisoned "the most ardent defenders of true liberty". The also blamed the Montagnard for the September massacres of the previous year.

During World War II, the town was severely damaged by a two-day battle in August 1944. On 1 January 2019, the former commune of Coudray-Rabut was merged into Pont-l'Évêque.

The town serves as the setting for Gustave Flaubert's story Un cœur simple and features heavily in the book 13 - Lucky For Some which is about the history of the 13th (Lancashire) Parachute Battalion. There are many then and now photographs as well as maps and diagrams of battles that took place in the region.

== Geography and toponymy ==
The river Touques flows through Pont-l'Évêque, which takes its name from a bridge (pont) built over the river. Starting in the 10th century, the local bishop (évêque) took responsibility for building and repairing the bridges and roads in France. Pont-l'Évêque thus means "Bishop Bridge". It was Latinised as Pons-Episcopi. Pont-l'Évêque station has rail connections to Paris, Deauville, Évreux and Lisieux.

== Population ==
Historical population
Year	Pop.	±% p.a.
1968	3,644	—
1975	3,913	+1.02%
1982	4,021	+0.39%
1990	4,156	+0.41%
1999	4,466	+0.80%
2007	4,494	+0.08%
2012	4,825	+1.43%
2017	4,662	−0.68%
2023	5,145	+1.66%
Source: INSEE

== Transport ==
- A13 autoroute
- A132 autoroute
- Route nationale 177
- Chemins de Fer de l'Ouest

== Twin Towns ==
- Ottery St Mary, United Kingdom (since 1977)
- Veitshöchheim, Germany (since 1994)

== Personalities ==
Pont-l'Évêque was the birthplace of:

- Roger de Pont L'Evêque (c. 1115–1181) – Archdeacon of Canterbury, and later Archbishop of York
- Dière de Dièreville (c. 1670–?) – surgeon, botanist and writer who wrote about his 1699–1700 voyage to Acadia
- Jacques Guillaume Thouret (1746–1794) – revolutionary, lawyer, president of the National Constituent Assembly
- Ferdinand Alphonse Hamelin (1796–1864) – Navy officer, Admiral and Minister of Marine

== Filming and Production ==
- Pont-l'Évêque :
  - 2000: Les Misérables TV series by Josée Dayan

The old prison of Pont-l'Évêque during the prison and visiting scenes

  - 2007: La Promeneuse d'oiseaux TV movie by Jacques Otmezguine
  - 2021: Meurtres à Pont-L’Évêque by Thierry Binisti
  - 2025: Gérald le Conquérant by Fabrice Éboué

== See also ==
- Communes of the Calvados department
- Pont-l'Évêque Prison
