= Pont-l'Évêque Prison =

Historic building in Normandy, France

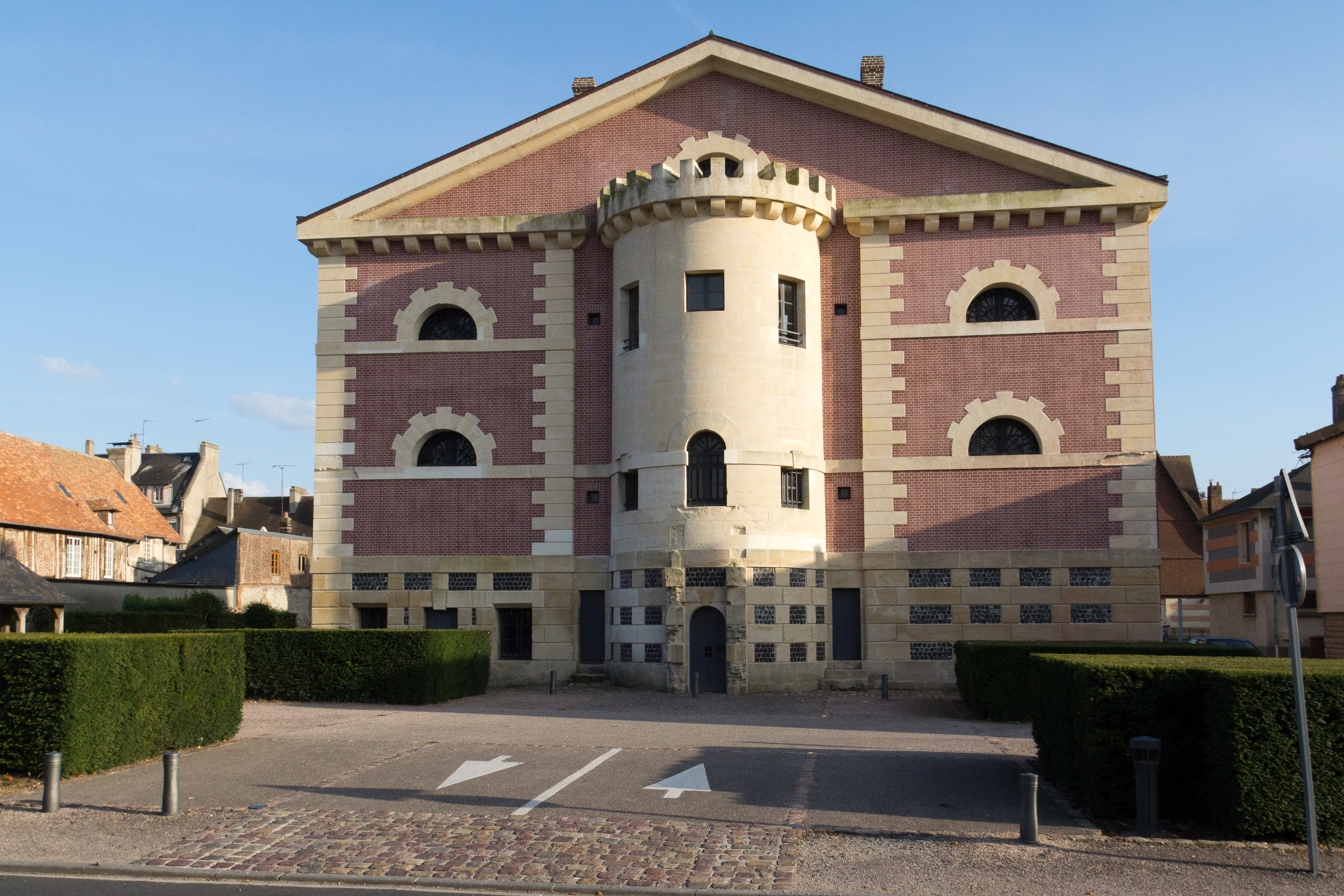
- Facade of the old prison

- Location within Calvados department
- 49°17′8″N 0°10′56″E
- Location: Pont-l'Évêque, Calvados; France

History
- Built: 1823

Monument historique
- Original purpose: Prison
- Current purpose: Disused; heritage area open to visitors
- Address: Eugène-Pian street

The Pont-l'Évêque Prison, also known as Joyeuse Prison, is a building constructed in the early 19th century in Pont-l'Évêque, in the French department of Calvados in the Normandy region. It is a rare example in France of a prison building that has been preserved after closure, the usual fate being demolition or conversion.

The building was used for the incarceration of prisoners from its commissioning at the end of the first quarter of the 19th century until its closure in the 1950s, following a scandal that tarnished the judicial institution and was the pretext for a popular comedy in the same decade starring Michel Simon, which immortalized the place.

After several decades of neglect, the building was bought by the commune in the early 2000s, and underwent a careful restoration and a heritage project considered a success, and a particularly rare one at that. At the beginning of the 21st century, the building's state of preservation is "an exceptional testimony to the revival of prison architecture in the early 19th century" and, according to J.-F. Alonzo, a lecturer at the École nationale d'administration pénitentiaire, "a vestige of a past both near and far".

== Location ==
The former prison is located behind the courthouse in Pont-l'Évêque, halfway between Deauville and Lisieux, at n° 5 of the Eugène-Pian street. This street runs transversely to Vicomté's street and, above all, Saint-Michel street, the urban section of the former RN 175, now the D675.

The prison is located in the commune's historic center, on the grounds of the former Dominican convent, of which only a 17th-century timber-framed building remains.

== Construction and history in the 19th century ==
The prison was built after the judicial reforms of the French Revolution and Empire, and at a time when a debate was taking place on places of deprivation of liberty. The prison was used for 130 years, from 1823 to 1953.

=== Creation ===
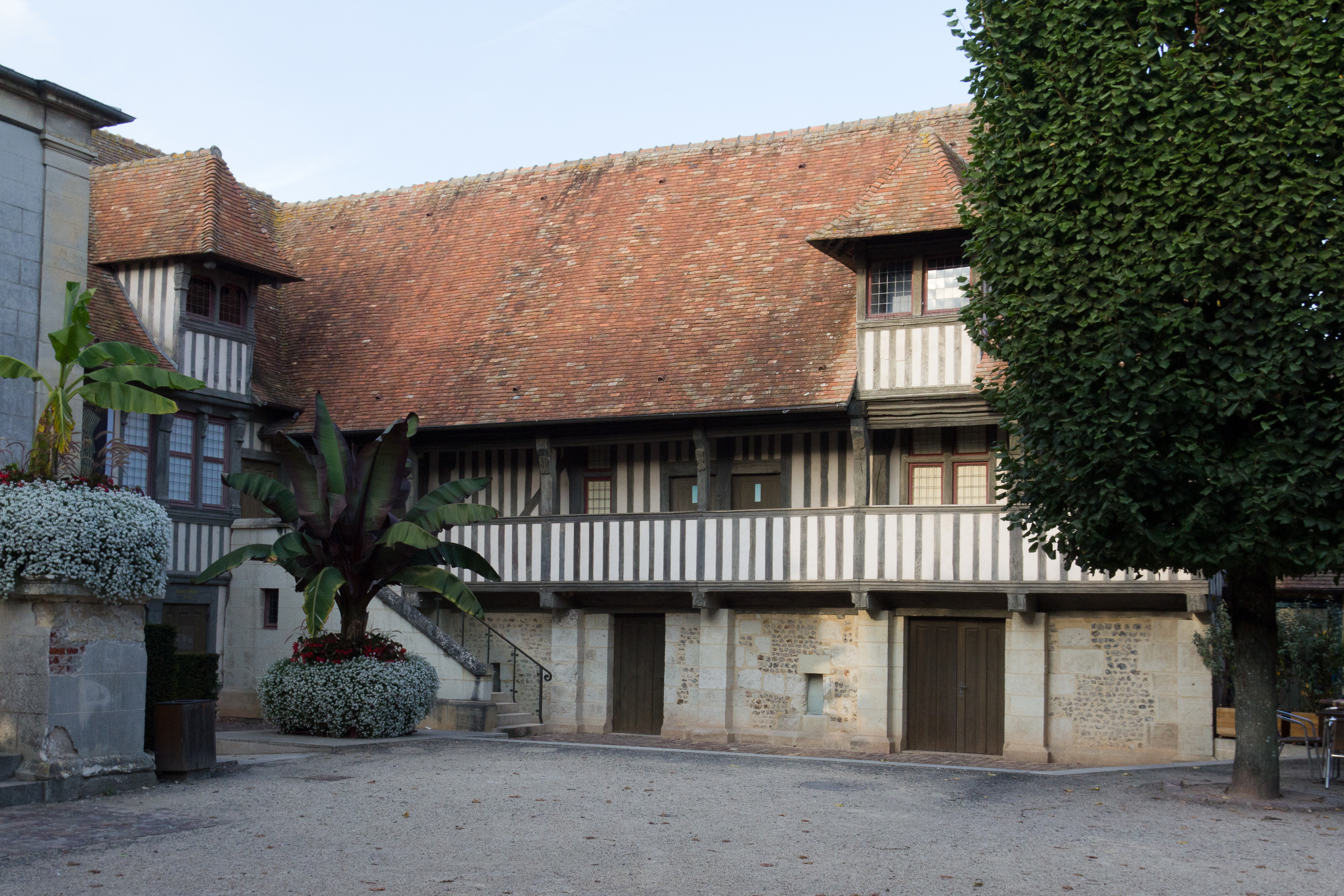
Remaining building of the Dominican convent of Isle.

The French Revolution put an end to corporal punishments such as the pillory, and the rule became imprisonment, coexisting with the death penalty and penal labour. The number of prisons was reduced from 1,000 to 400, and the penitentiary administration was set up with different levels of prisons controlled by prefects.

In 1810, the Penal Code of 1810 was promulgated, reintroducing life imprisonment and hot branding. A sum of 11 million francs was earmarked for the restoration or replacement of "insalubrious and dilapidated gaols from the Ancien Régime", but this work was not carried out due to the Russian campaign. An ordinance of September 9, 1814, at the start of the Restoration, spoke of prison reform and the role of religion and work in the prison world. In 1818, Interior Minister Joseph-Henri-Joachim Lainé submitted a report to the King on the situation of hospices, foundlings, lunatics, beggars and prisons. The following year, the Société royale pour l'amélioration des prisons (Royal Society for the Improvement of Prisons) was founded, enabling work to be carried out in over 270 prisons across the country. In 1819, the new Minister of the Interior, Élie Decazes, commissioned a wide-ranging survey of the state of prisons in Calvados, which proved unsatisfactory: with the exception of Vire, they were described as "insalubrious and inadequate". Other works and reports were published by Louis René Villermé, Jean-Pierre Danjou and François Barbé-Marbois. The latter wrote a report on the state of prisons in Calvados, Eure, Manche and Seine-Inférieure, in which he described the Pont-l'Évêque building as the "most hideous" prison. The Société de la morale chrétienne also played a role in the movement.

The construction of the Pont-l'Évêque prison thus took place at a time when the desire for in-depth reform of the French prison system was taking shape, and it was "one of the essential links in the history of French prison architecture", preceding the "cell fever of the July Monarchy". Crime rates in Basse-Normandie were very high, at around 20 per 100,000 around 1825, and half that again at the beginning of the 20th century.

=== Building ===
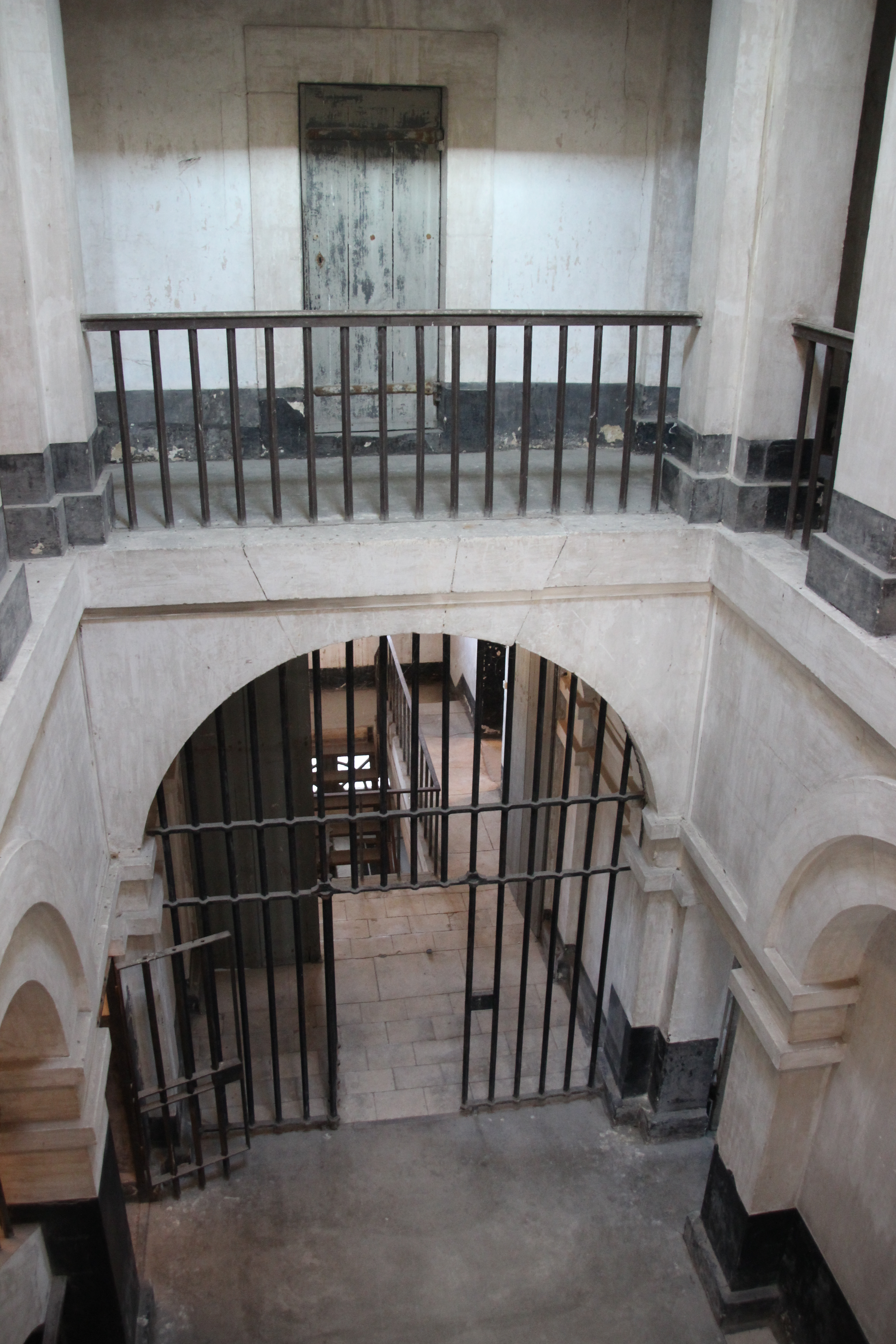
View towards the former chapel at skylight level.

Before the prison was built, the commune did not own one. Part of the house belonging to a private individual, Sieur Labbey, was used as a prison. It has a capacity of 76 people and, according to the mayor, receives an average of 900 people a year. According to a report by Prefect Charles Ambroise de Caffarelli du Falga, the owner was paid 500 francs in rent. Prisoners were not segregated by offence or even by sex, except at night for the latter category. They could not work, and promiscuity reigned. The number of inmates often exceeded the 76-place capacity, with some months having 86 or even 90 occupants, and the facility was "neither safe [...] nor healthy". In his report, Caffarelli indicated that 50,000 francs were needed for a new facility.

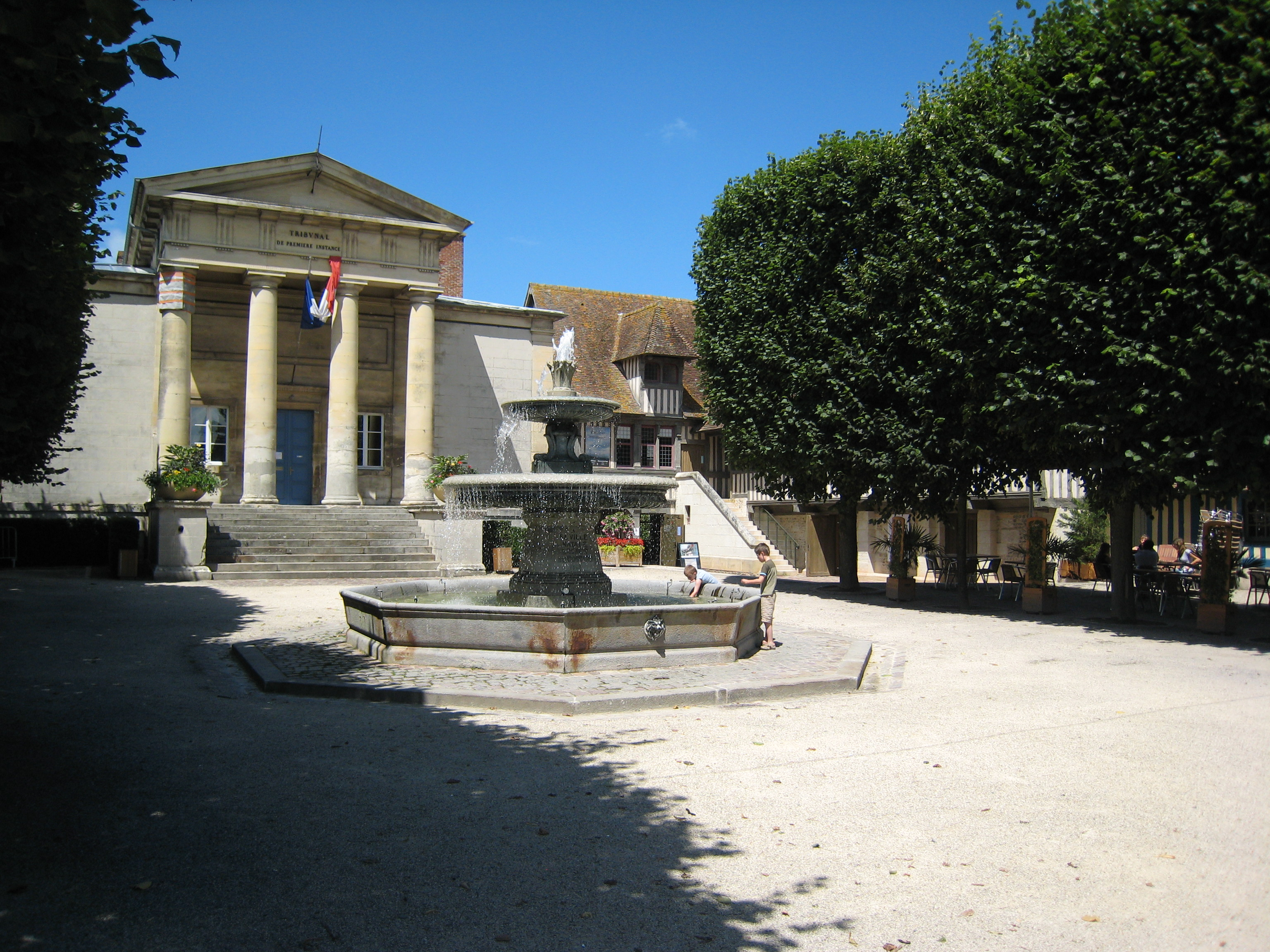
Place des Dominicaines with the old courthouse.

After considering converting an existing building in the commune, such as the Dominican convent or the corn market, it was decided to build a new one, to avoid using a fragile timber-framed building, especially in the event of fire.

Like its neighbor building, the Pont-l'Évêque courthouse, the prison was built on the site of parts of the Dominican convent closed in 1792, in particular the conventual courtyards and certain buildings of the religious institution. The courthouse, for its part, was built on the site of the former church of the same institution.

Construction of the prison and courthouse was ordered by imperial decree on May 25, 1811 or May 15, 1811; the decree provided for a new prison in Falaise in addition to the one in Pont-l'Évêque. Plans had to be submitted by September 1, 1812, and construction of the prison building was completed in 1823, with that of the courthouse completed in 1828.

Construction was led by Jean-Baptiste Philippe Harou (Romain) born in Bernay in 1761 and died in 1822. It was completed by his son Romain Harou. The latter was awarded the second Grand Prix d'Architecture in 1788, and played an important role in cultural policy during the French Revolution. The company responsible for the work was based in Le Havre.

== Architecture ==
The architect designed a beautiful building that reflected in stone the progress made in thinking about prisons, even if he had not foreseen everything and had to skilfully integrate changes into his project as it progressed.

=== Architecture based on philanthropic concepts ===
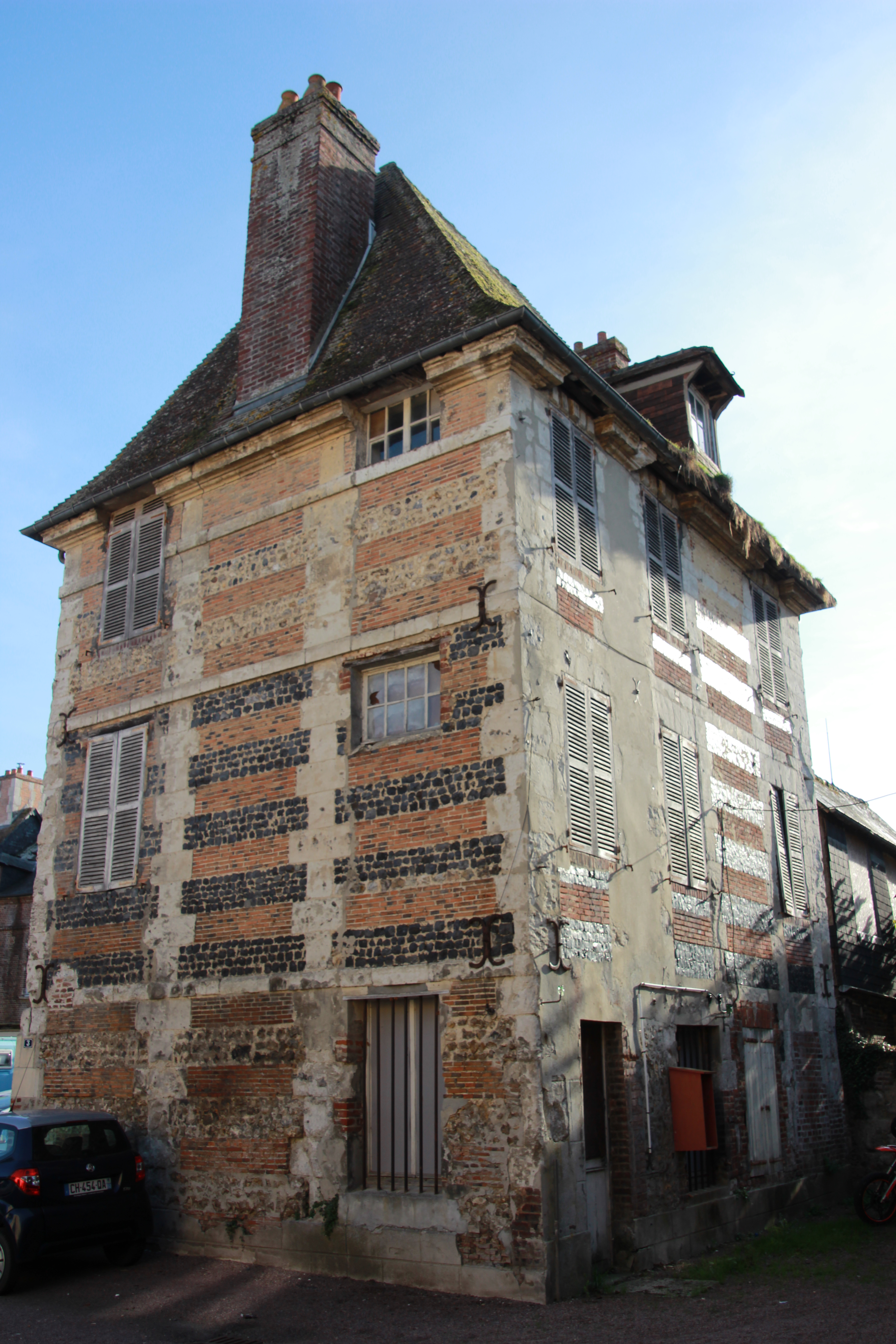
The 17th-century Viscounty of Auge building, which inspired Harou-Romain.

The edifice was built of stone, brick and flint, giving it "a beautiful polychrome appearance". The architecture was neo-classical, and the façades were carefully designed. The architect demonstrated "aesthetic care and [...] refinement": the building was "functional in its plan, rhythmically symmetrical, aesthetically pleasing in its appearance". Harou-Romain drew his inspiration from the nearby 17th-century Viscounty of Auge building, which also features polychromy due to the use of different building materials.

The base is a checkerboard of flint and stone, while the upper floors are made of brick with stone quoins and frames. A granite staircase leads to the south façade of the building, closest to the courthouse. The center of the north façade is occupied by a stone half-tower housing the head warden's lodgings. This tower also marks the separation between the men's side and the side reserved for women and children. The roof slope is shallow.

The building's layout was based on "philanthropic concerns", with a symmetrical organization and a "concern [...] for classification, order, education and religion, with assigned quarters". The building was built according to symmetrical principles: the sexes were separated, the chapel was centrally located, surveillance was constant and inmates had visiting rooms. According to the philanthropic principles embodied in the prison's architecture, hygiene was to be improved and chains abolished, to enable prisoners to be redeemed through religion and education.

"External views of the building"
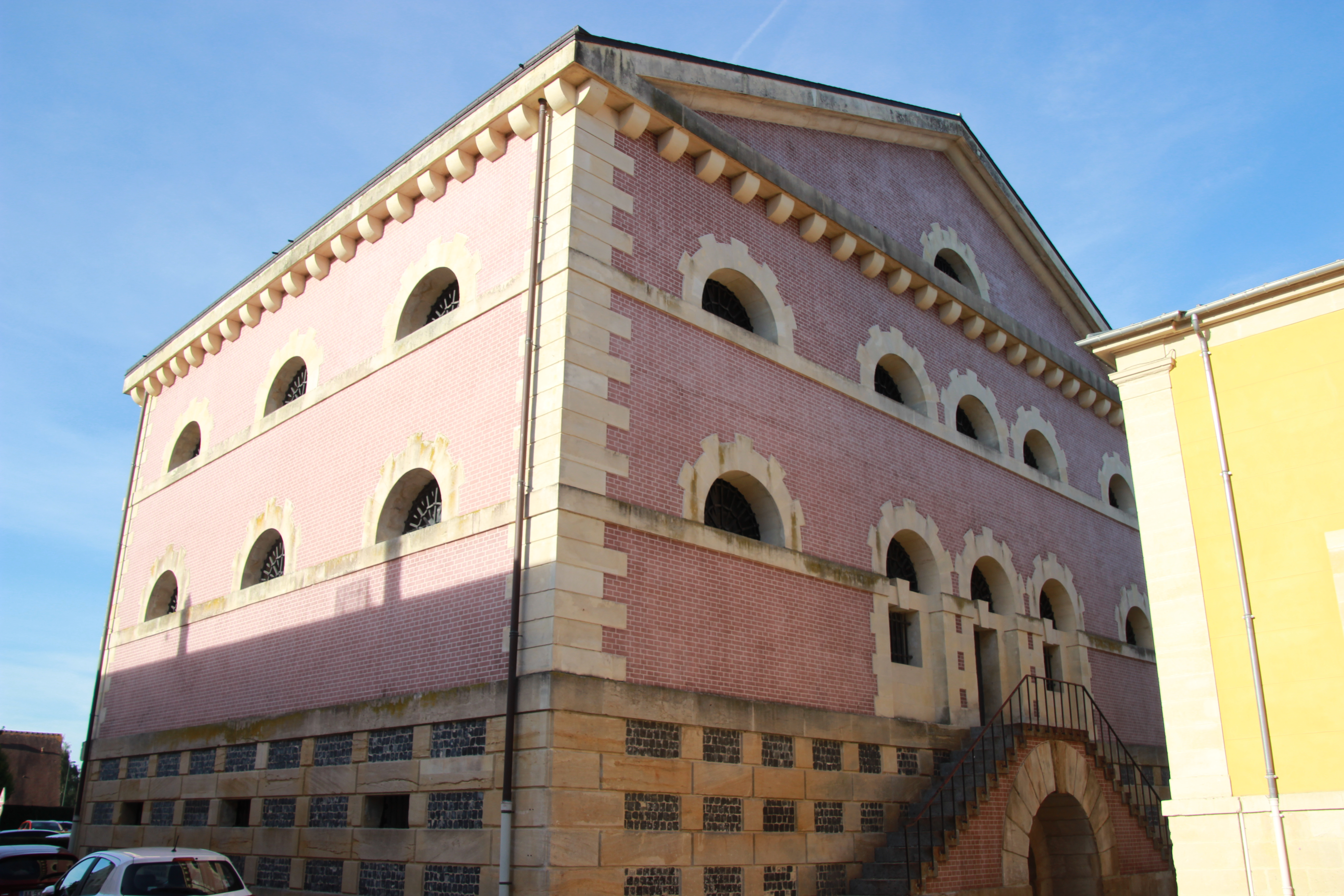
Prison façade, courthouse side.

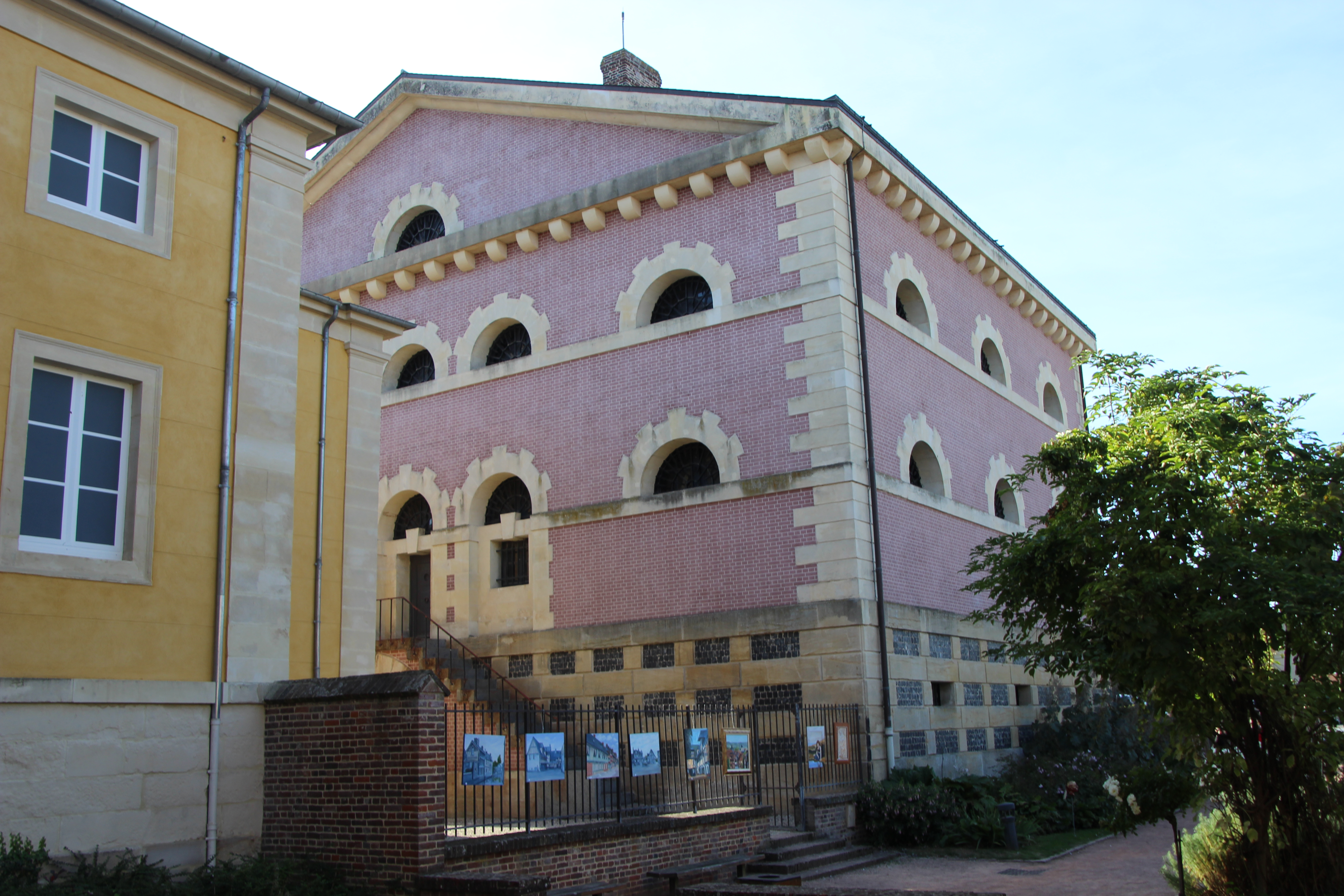
Façade of the prison on the Dominican cultural space side.

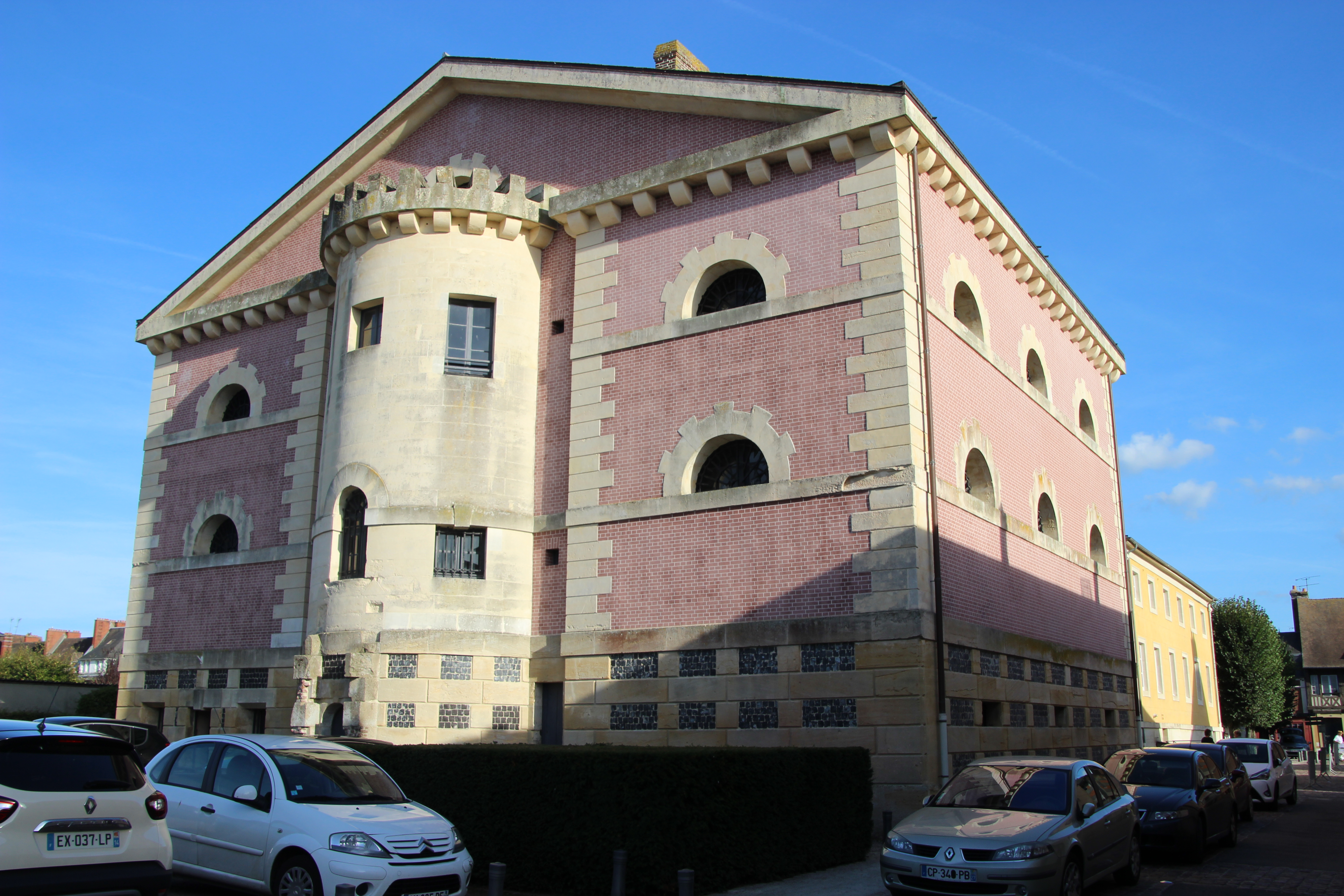
Prison facade on rue de la Vicomté.

=== Internal layout of the building ===
Plan of the 1st floor of the prison.

The prison was initially designed to accommodate around 40 inmates. The genders were separated on the two floors with shared cells. The courtyard was also divided in two, for each gender, and surrounded the building on three sides. Each floor has four 25 m² collective cells; inmates are segregated according to gender and the legal status of their situation. The prison has visiting rooms and offices, as well as staff accommodation, including that of the head warden, on two floors of the half-tower.

At the center of the building there are a skylight and a chapel. This religious space was added after the fact: it does not exist on the original plans supplied by Harou-Romain, and the layout under the skylight was designed to "play on religious symbolism". Religious services can be attended from the landings. In 1868, a library of 112 books was available to prisoners.

The dungeons are at the base of the building, and the prison has solitary confinement cells. The prison retains some graffiti that have not been studied.

"Internal views of the building"
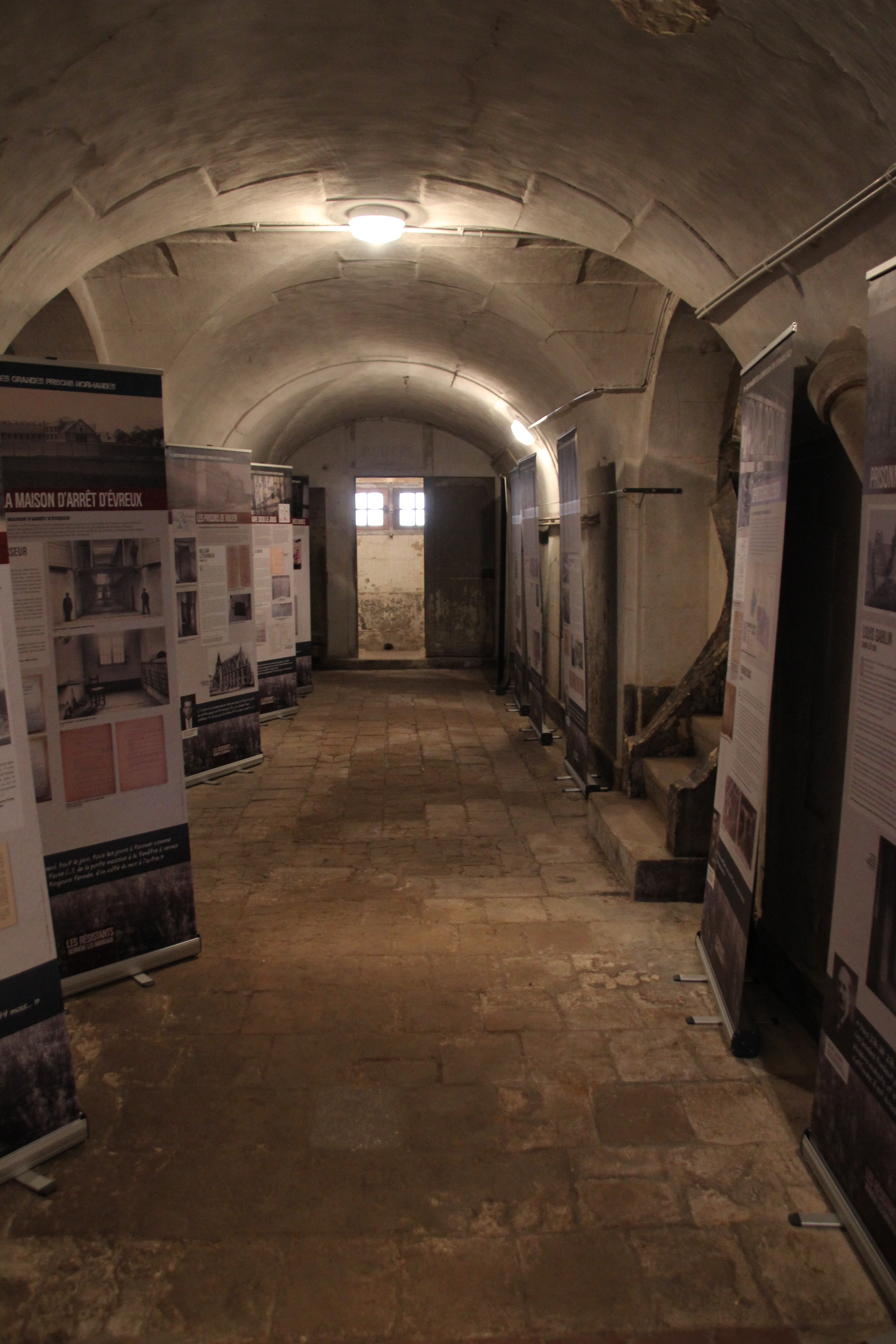
Ground floor corridor.

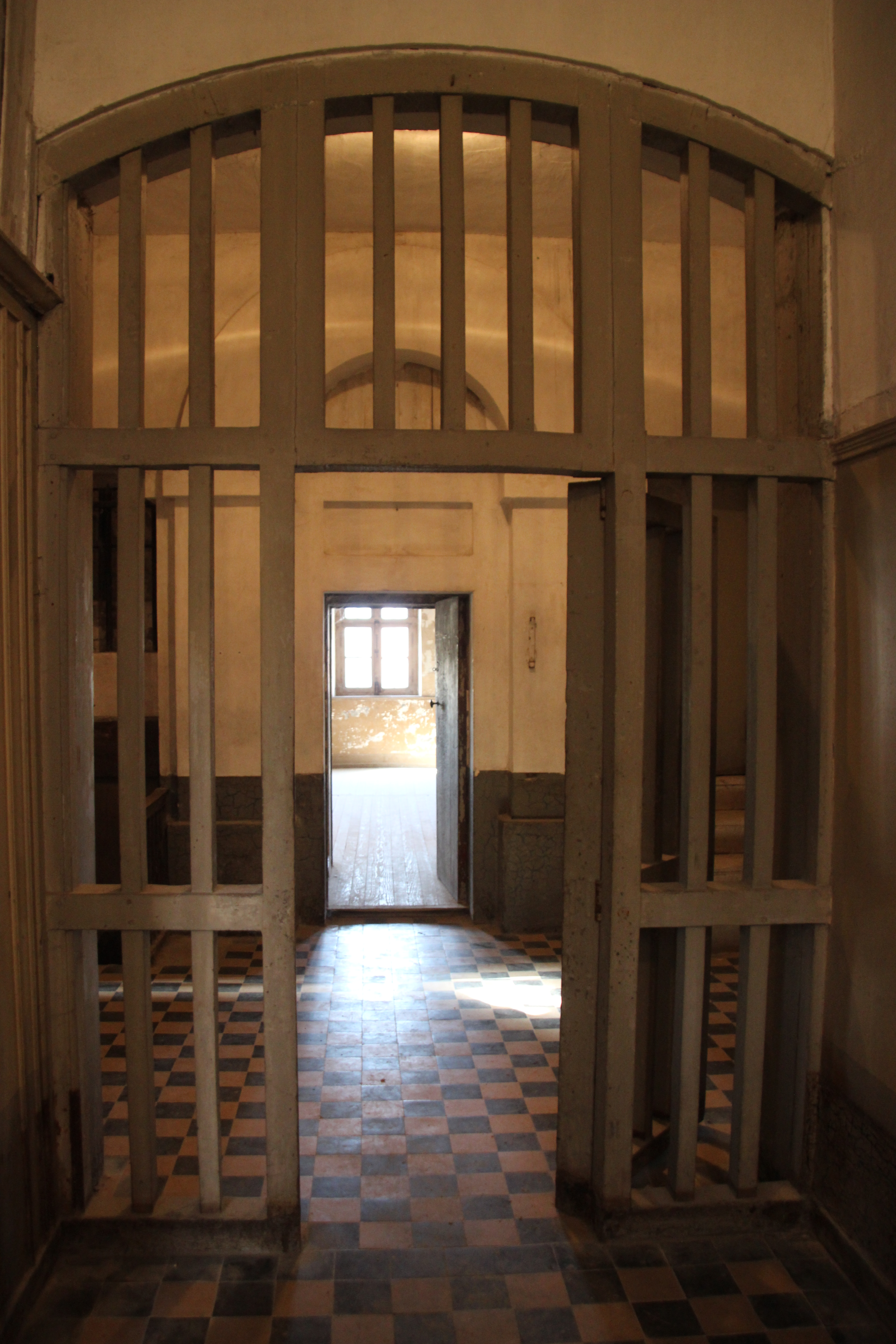
Internal access to the prison.

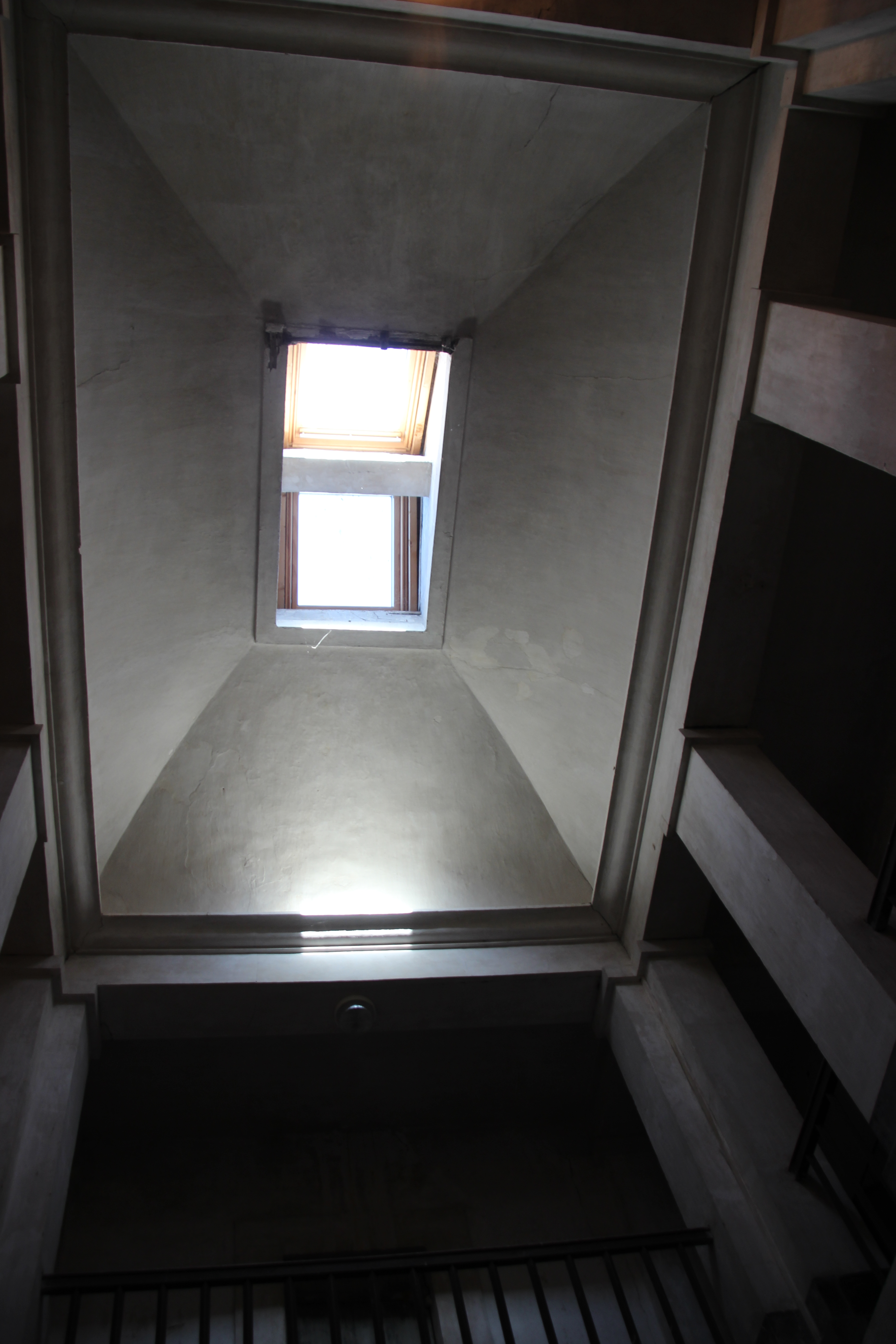
Skylights.

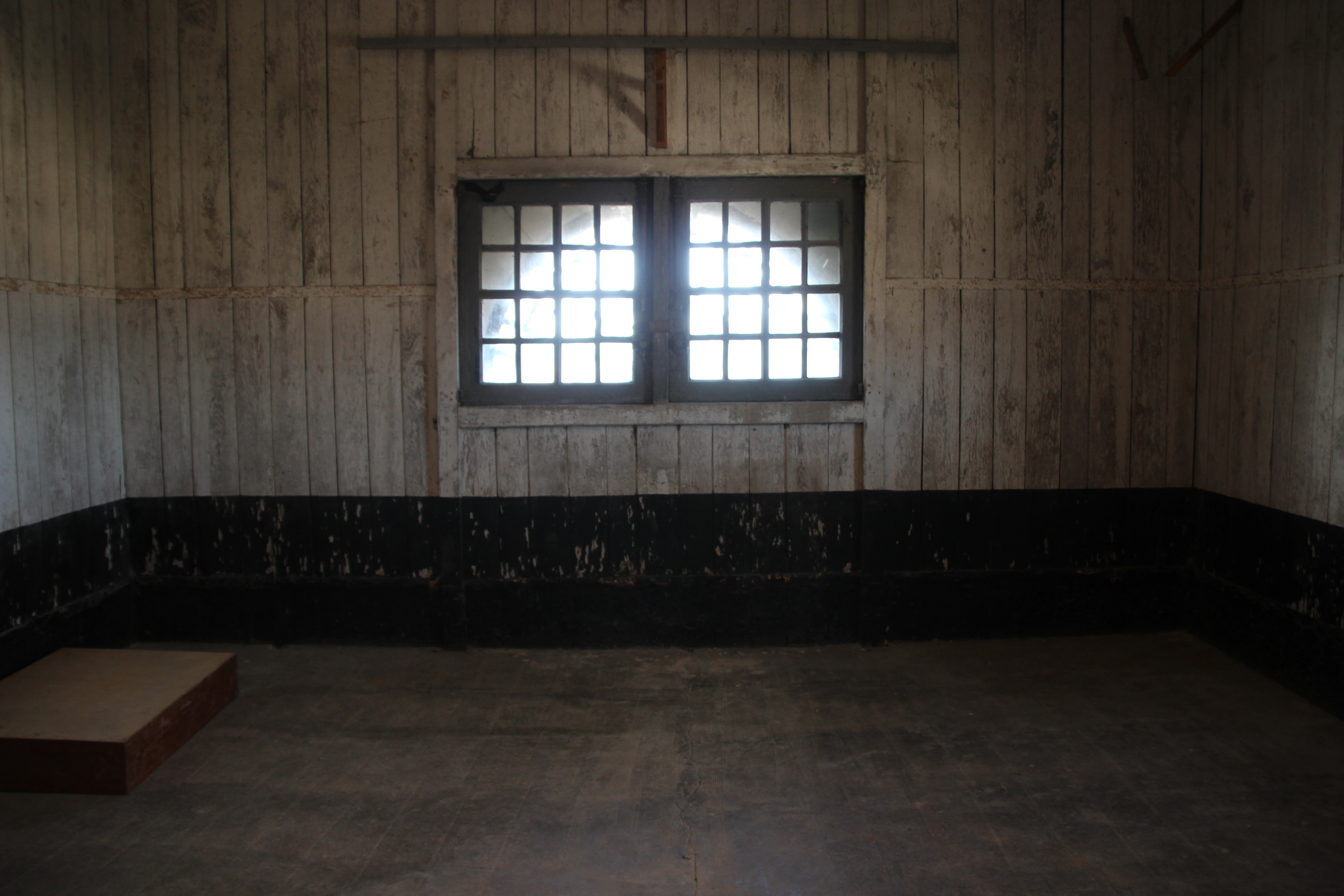
Shared cell.

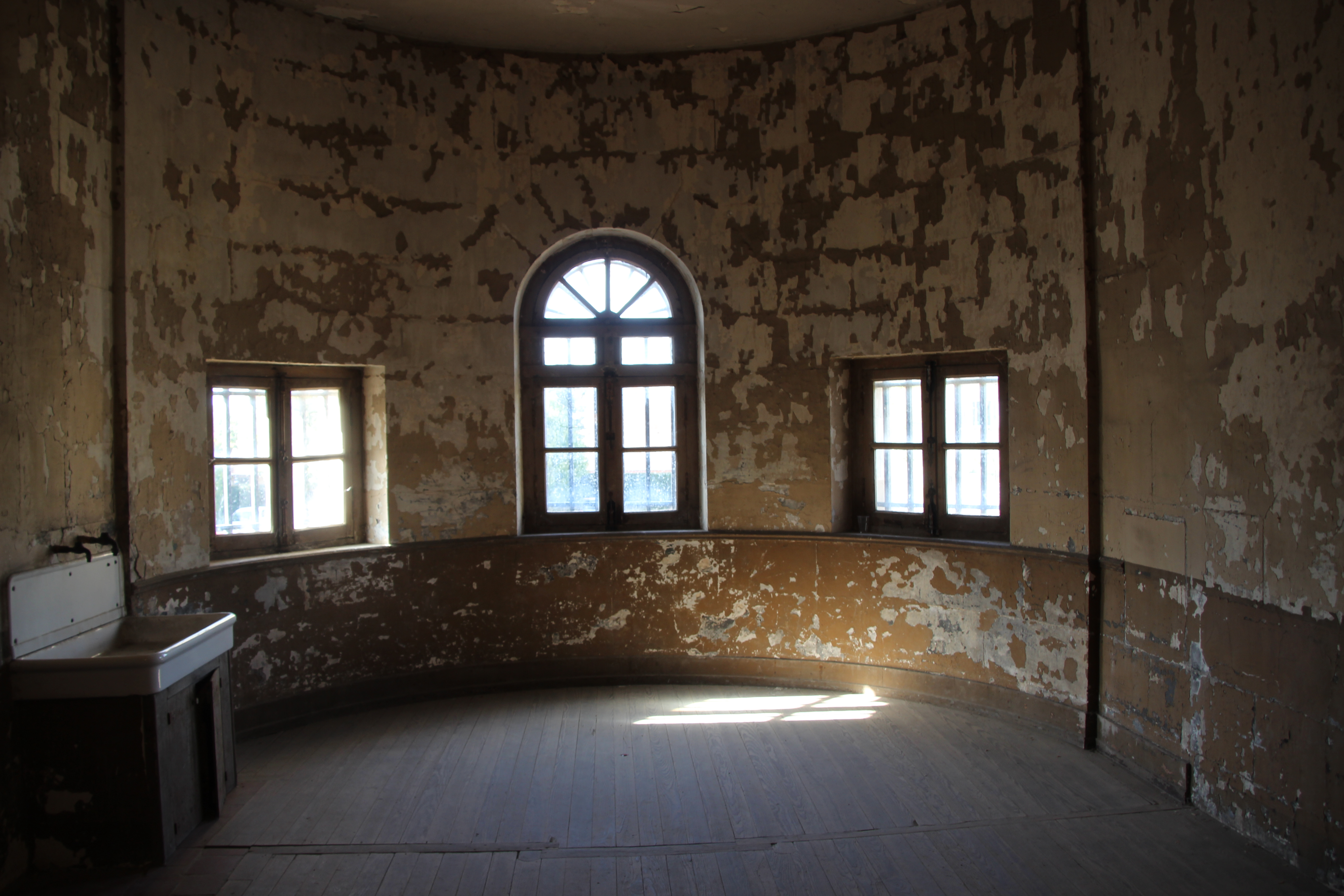
Dining room in the janitor's lodgings.

== Philanthropic theories put to the test in prison ==
Developed according to philanthropic theories, the prison soon became a place of daily hardship and security problems. Prisoners came mainly from the poorer classes and were often incarcerated for minor offenses. Prison life was also marked by inequality of treatment, with the application of paid supplements, improving conditions for those with means but leaving others in more than precarious conditions.

=== Premises and prison staff issues ===
The prison was under the supervision of the Ministries of the Interior and Justice. Maintenance was carried out by the commune, then by the Departmental Council of Calvados. A commission comprising the mayor, the sub-prefect, a doctor, a chaplain and local notables was responsible for overseeing the establishment.

A set of internal rules governed community life, but they seem to have been lost and are no longer known. The principles underlying the building's construction soon came up against a difficult day-to-day reality: the prison had problems with the upkeep of its premises, lighting, heating and inadequate sanitary facilities, leading to reports of poor hygiene that were exacerbated by overcrowding over the years. In the mid-19th century, an inspection by the prison administration severely criticized the building. The work requested around 1870 was even more extensive, affecting both sanitary conditions and the reception of prisoners and visitors, as well as the state of the building in general. Subsequently, "the reports became [even] more alarming". In addition, inmates were billed for any damage to the premises or equipment.

The staff employed was both under-qualified and insufficient in number. Three wardens were responsible for supervising the inmates. The head guard was responsible for the administration of the facility and personnel management, as well as all aspects of day-to-day life, while his wife acted as janitor for the women and children. There was only one "ordinary janitor". The inspection reports painted a picture of some of the staff members, who were not all without qualities, even if the number of staff was insufficient, especially as administrative work tended to increase over the years.

External image
- Old postcard of the north side of the prison with part of the enclosure wall.

The administration soon realized that the walls isolating the courtyard allowed vocal or object exchanges with the city, or even an escape. This situation was exacerbated by poor surveillance and the absence of a guard wall. A report by the sub-prefect in 1880 noted that "the prison is in such a poor state that prisoners can escape from any direction". In 1921, the head warden stressed his difficulties with overcrowding and the lack of basic repairs, wishing to relieve himself and his subordinates of responsibility in the event of an escape. As a result, there were many escapes or attempted escapes, one of which, in 1846, was particularly impressive: a man named Loudais had climbed through the attic and pierced the wall of his cell. The hole was hidden by a sheet, and the perpetrator had made a long rope on the spot.

Similarly, in the early 1830s, "glaring deficiencies" were reported, in particular the lack of basic facilities in the infirmary and of a nurse. At the end of the 1830s, the doctor wrote to the mayor of the commune asking him to intercede on behalf of the unfortunate sick prisoners. The doctor attached to the prison in 1870 appears to have been negligent in the regularity of his visits. The lack of basic hygiene was also highlighted in the 1921 report by the head warden: prisoners have no access to baths or showers, and the toilets are in a worrying state, as their contents regularly spill into the corridors and stairways. Inmates were also short of linen and clogs.

=== Inmates marked by social misery ===
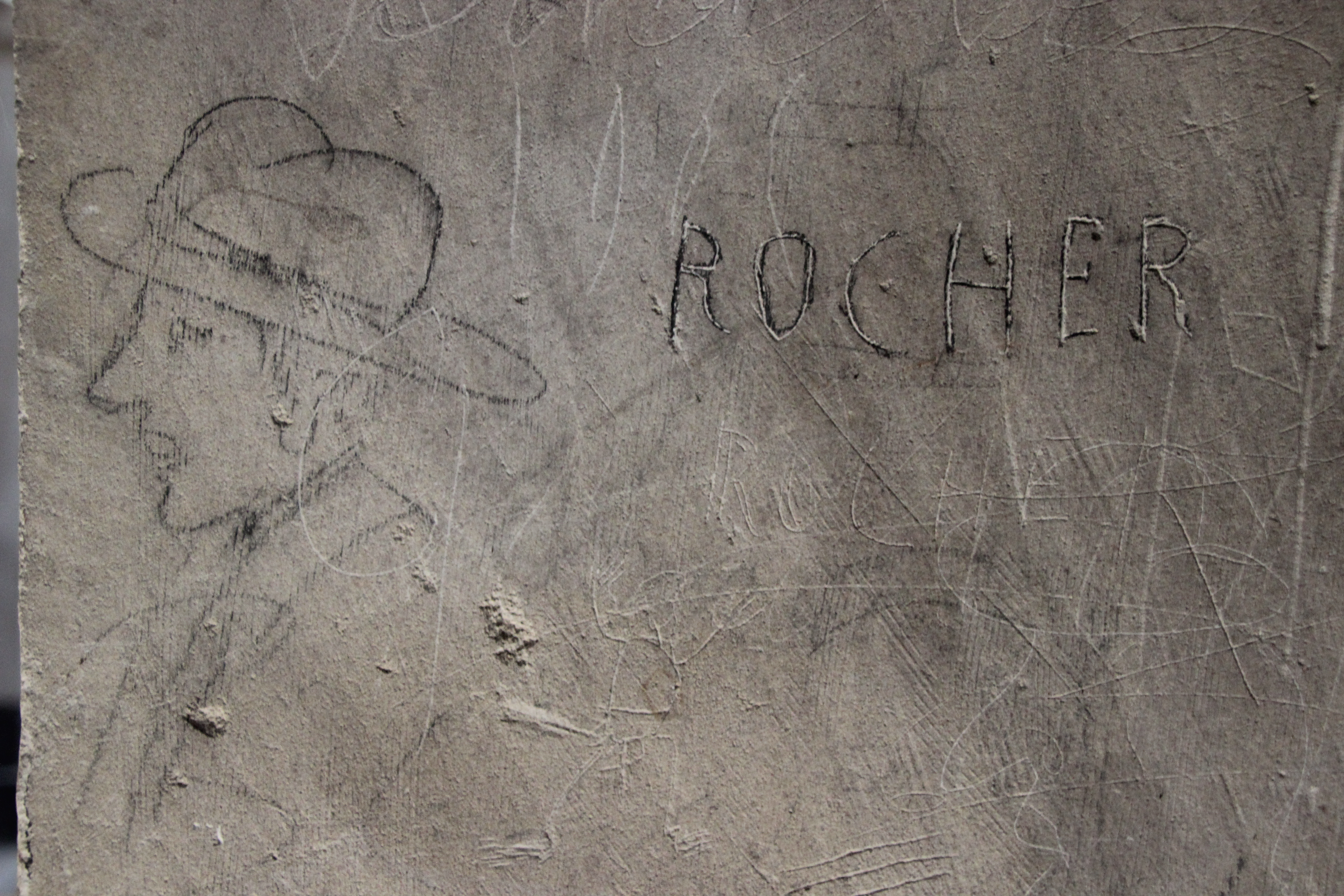
Superimposition of several graffiti.

The Pont-l'Évêque inmates had committed minor offences. More serious and violent offenses led to detention at Beaulieu prison after conviction. The building was first occupied by around 14 prisoners, then by the end of the 19th century by around 100. Prison overcrowding was also noted, with three men occupying individual bunks and women being transferred to Caen in 1874. This overcrowding seemed to be linked to the development of the coastal towns of Deauville, Trouville-sur-Mer and Honfleur.

Barbenchon and Dutour carried out a partial study of the prison registers on a sample basis. The average age of inmates was around 30, and between a quarter and a third of them were women. The incarcerated mothers came from the commune and the surrounding area, and were accompanied by young children under the age of two; most of them came from modest social backgrounds. Men and women were mostly incarcerated for minor offences such as assault and battery, simple theft or begging. In addition to these offences, they were also charged with insulting behaviour and, above all, drunkenness. The absence of sobering-up cells in communal buildings was a factor in the worsening of the prison's internal situation. As noted in the registers, they led to confinement ranging from a simple sobering-up to a fortnight's detention. The public drunkenness situation was not resolved until 1901. Barbenchon and Dutour mention one outrage to modesty and 15% of inmates locked up for debt, while the archives bear witness to "a latent impression of misery", according to the authors.

Incarcerated men were either on remand, convicted or awaiting transfer. The youngest and oldest were incarcerated for vagrancy. Physical characteristics were indicated, as was clothing, which was often described as worn; inmates had headgear, hats or caps. Only inmates sentenced to one year's imprisonment were provided with a uniform. 43% of 1884 inmates were day laborers, and over a third were illiterate. The other inmates came from manual professions (sailors, small tradesmen, laborers, etc.), and none from bourgeoise backgrounds.

=== Difficult day-to-day life marked by major inequalities in treatment ===
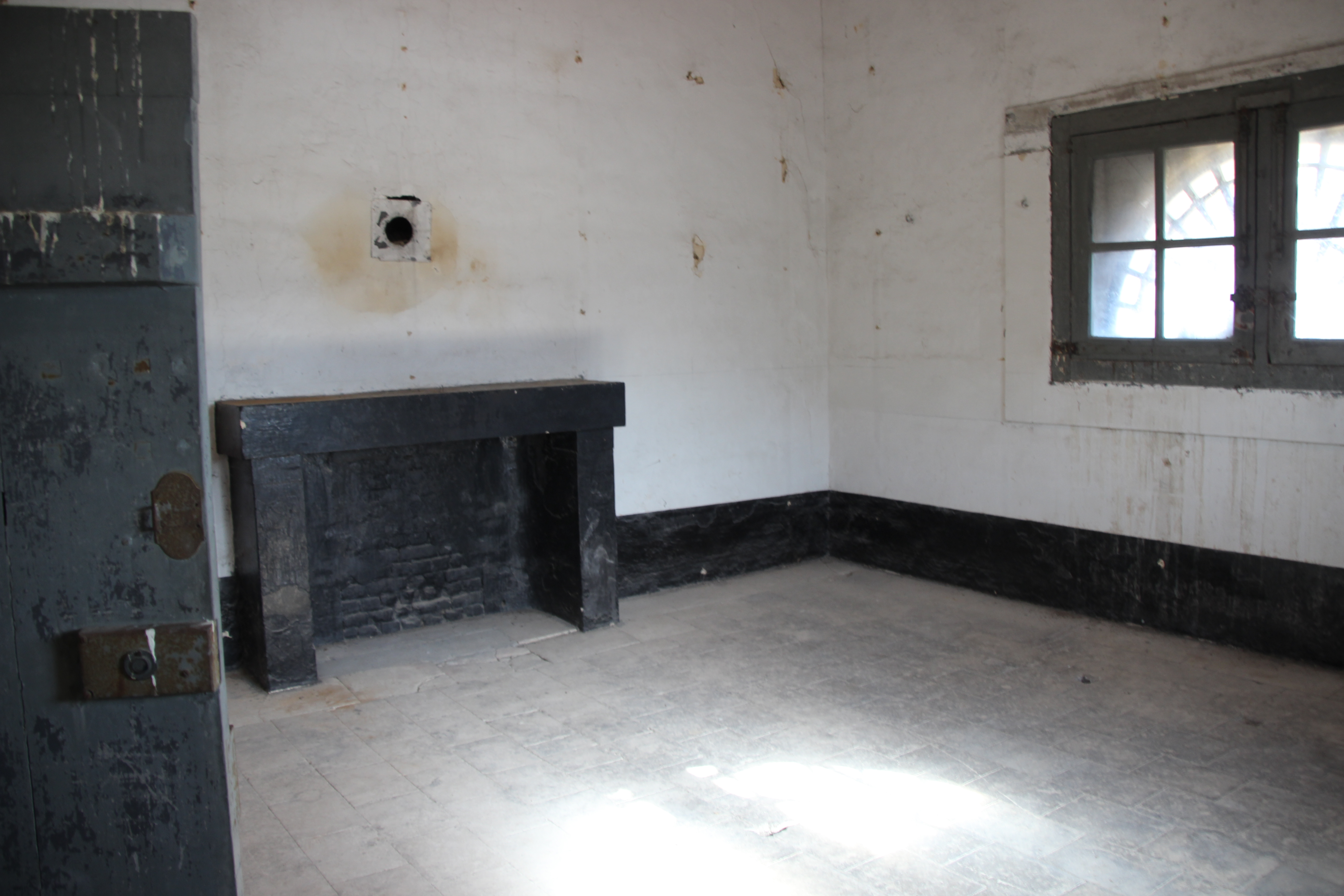
Communal cell with fireplace.

The inmates worked. The work entrusted to inmates has been identified: slippers, fishing nets, sewing and knitting, chairs, corks for cider bottles. Most of the inmates' sentences were short, ranging from ten days to a year, which made it difficult for them to learn a job when it involved specialized tasks. Work was carried out daily in difficult conditions, in cells and without lighting, and 43% of the income from work went to the inmates, while 49% went to companies and 8% to the public treasury.

Meals costed the administration 0.49 francs a day in the late 1860s. Soup was prepared in the prison kitchen; bread was bought from a baker. Some inmates were able to improve the meals for a fee. This led to abuses and eventually to the administration regulating the content of food supplements and suppliers. Food, both bread and any supplements, was of poor quality and insufficient in quantity at least in the early 1860s, as one report points out. The bread supplied in 1870 caused intestinal problems for the inmates, due to the inadequate quality of the ingredients and similar processing. The baker was sent to train with a colleague entrusted with the same mission for the Caen prison.

Relatively well-off inmates could also swap a simple straw mattress for a bed, with a "furnished room" costing twice as much in Pont-l'Évêque than in Bayeux or Caen. These extras provided additional income for the janitors. From the 1880s onwards, the list of authorized everyday items was extended to include snuff, combs, feather and pen holders, postcards, etc., following a general directive from the administration.

The prison was administratively closed in 1921. It was not reopened until nine years later.

"Daily life in prison"
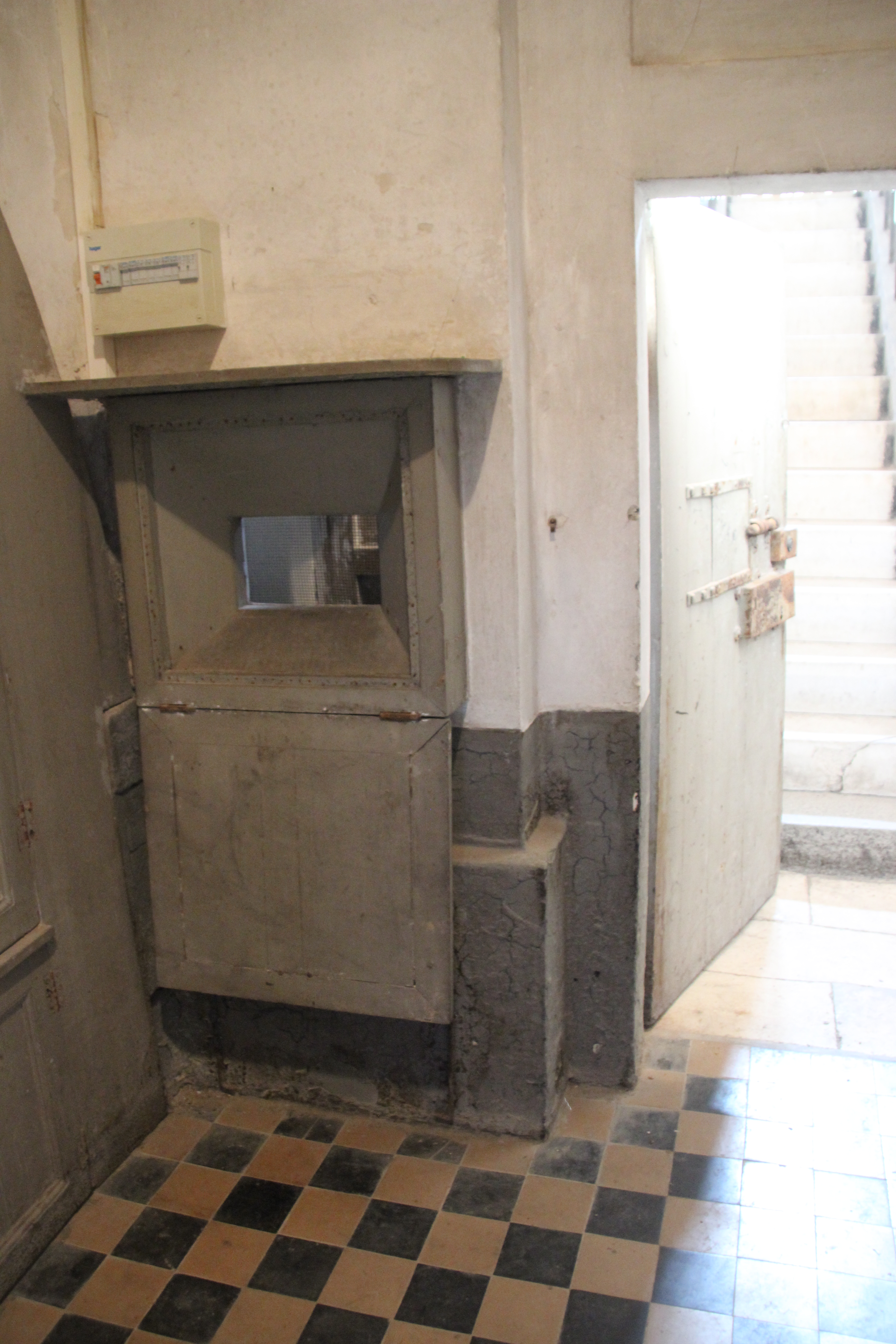
Parlor.

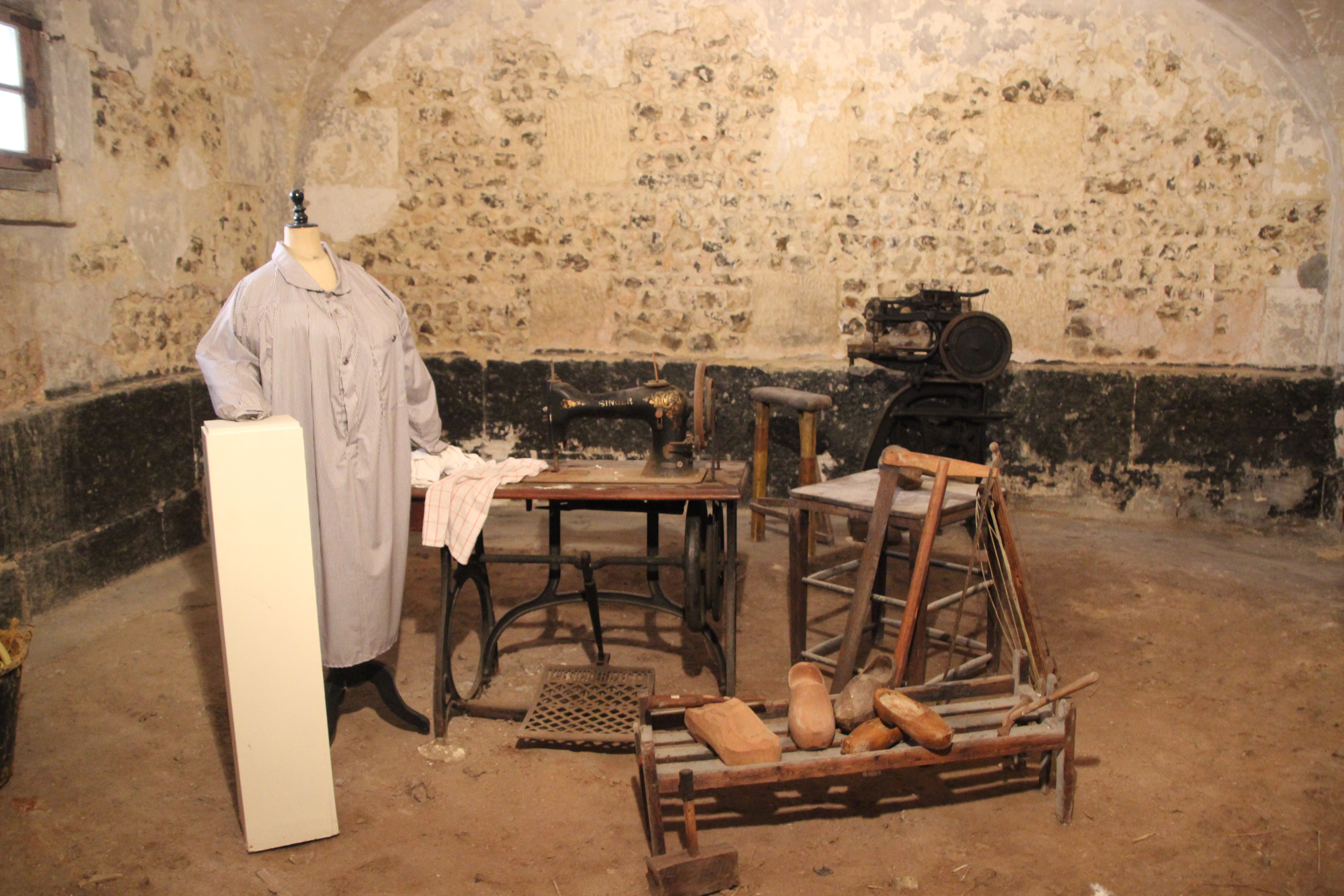
Clogmaker's workshop.

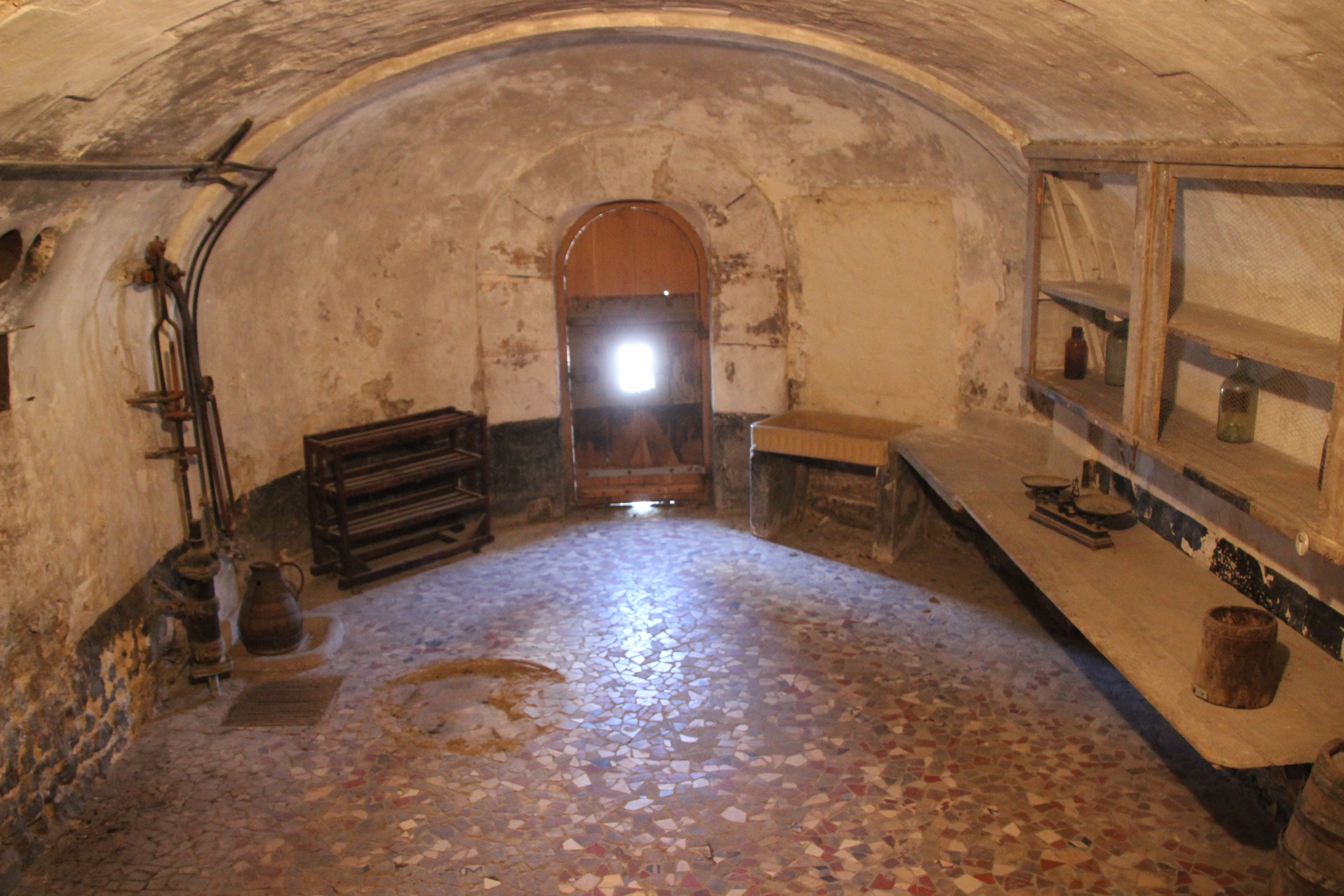
Kitchen.

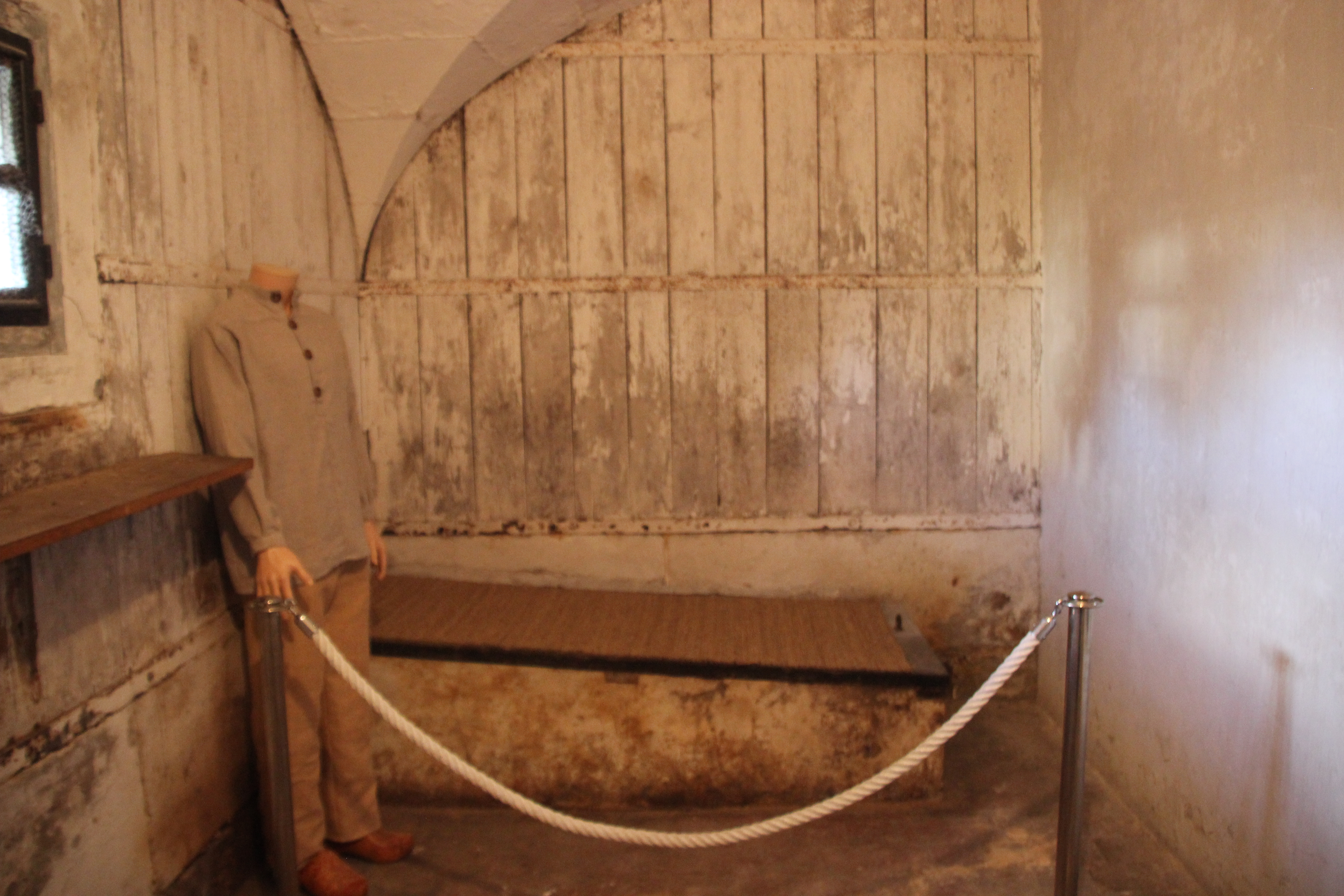
Solitary confinement cell.

== The "Joyeuse Prison" affair ==
In the late 1940s and 1950s, the prison was the scene of a scandal that made headlines in the legal world. What started out as an investigation into an escape became a resounding scandal, and the prison was closed due to its poor operation. Popular cinema seized on the subject and a comedy was based on the story, forging the legend of the "Joyeuse Prison".

=== Site of one of René la Canne's many escapes ===
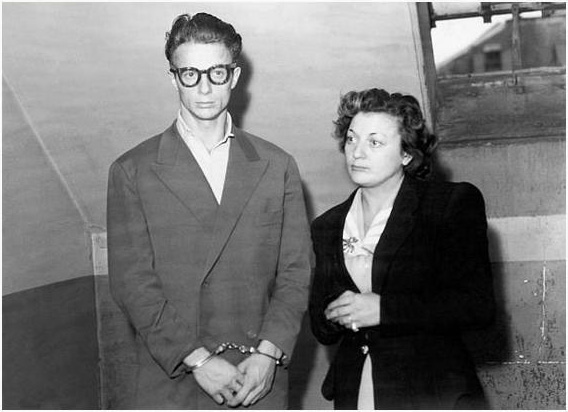
René la Canne in 1948.

René Girier, nicknamed "René la Canne", number one public enemy at the time, was incarcerated at Pont-l'Évêque after robbing a jewelry store in Deauville, or after the attempted theft of a car for which he was convicted on January 18, 1949. The repentant criminal describes prison in his memoirs, published in the 1970s.

René la Canne was portrayed by the newspapers of the time as the "archetypal rogue with a big heart", due to his lack of violence and his choice of victims, the jeweler Van Cleef & Arpels and the French Prime Minister Édouard Daladier. His nickname comes from the fact that he remained lame after an arrest that goes wrong.

He escaped 17 times from various prisons in eight years. In April 1949, he escaped from Pont-l'Évêque prison, not by using the prison's open doors, but by sawing through the bars. As he had befriended the head warden, he "had to ingeniously escape from a prison from which you can get out through the door", according to Superintendent Roger Borniche. He was recaptured in 1951.

=== From the trial to the "Joyeuse Prison" legend ===
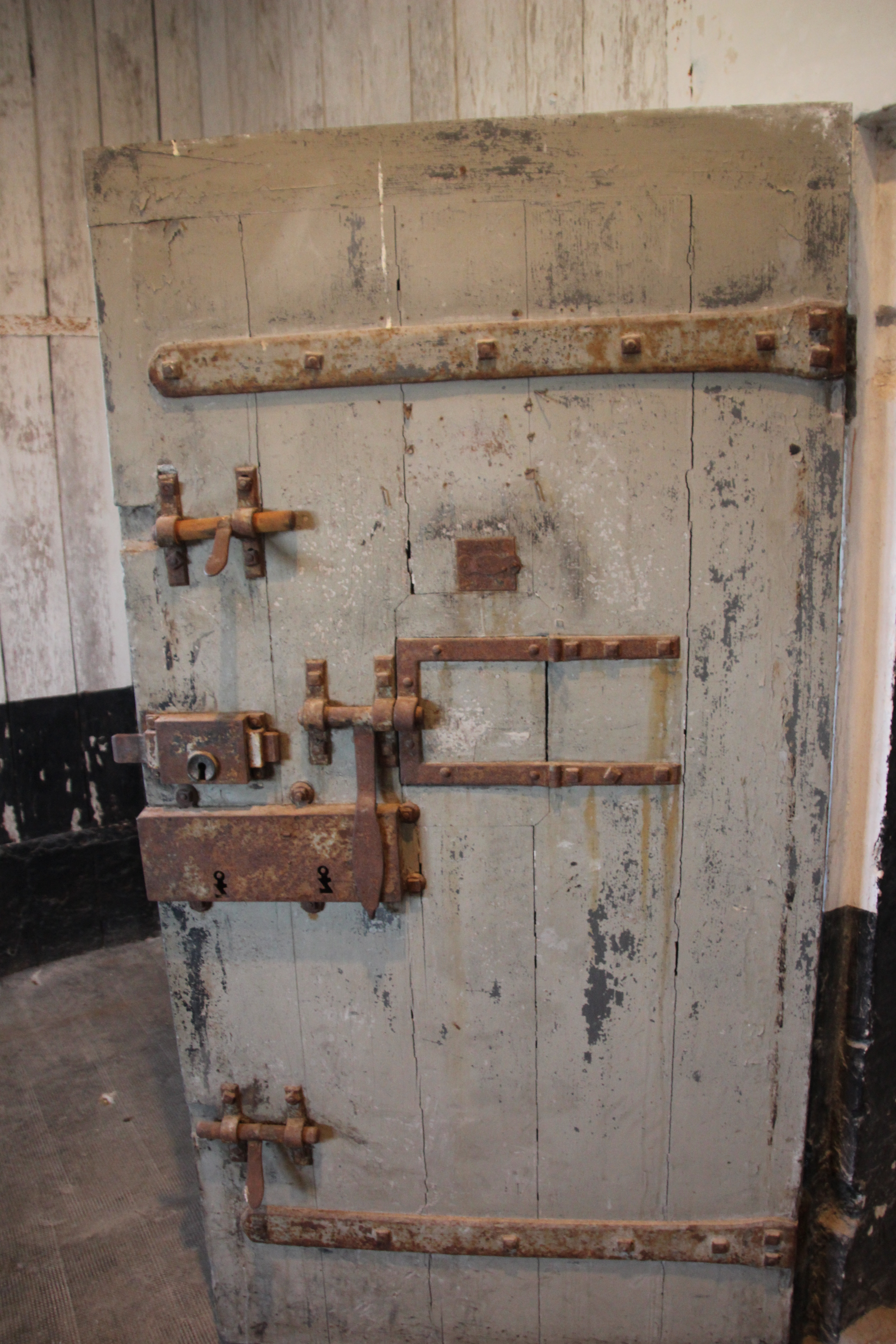
Door to one of the communal cells.

including the gate being opened during the day by the head warden, Fernand Billa, while inmates were theoretically expected to return in the evening and carry out "tasks inherent to prison management". The prison was closed shortly afterwards in 1953.

The case went to trial in October 1955 at the Calvados Assize Court, resulting in a large file weighing 10 kg and measuring one meter in height. Eight defendants appeared on charges of forgery and use of forgeries, some of whom were in charge of the guards' pay slips or bookkeeping and signed in place of the head guard, while others went out to work or to the café. During the trial, the head guard seemed "overwhelmed by events".

The press nicknamed the establishment "Joyeuse Prison", but also "Boarding house for gangsters" or "prison for Les Pieds Nickelés" or "prison on a budget", due to the laxity of the regime: visits, outings, privileges, improved diet in both solid and liquid terms, work carried out in the homes of the town's inhabitants, including the magistrates of the neighboring courthouse, conjugal visits, etc. This regime was reserved for inmates who could pay for these privileges. In his memoirs, René la Canne recalls how the lower classes led a "convict-like existence, dying of hunger and cold, gnawed by filth and invaded by vermin", with a strict prison regime.

The prison administration was held responsible, and the verdict led to the acquittal of the prisoners. The head warden, "a drunkard in post since 1946", was dismissed and sentenced to three years' imprisonment.

External image
- Movie poster.

A film inspired by the case and directed by André Berthomieu, La Joyeuse Prison, was released in 1956, starring Michel Simon as the head warden and Darry Cowl as the lawyer and Robert Dalban.

== Abandonment and patrimonialization ==
The prison was closed and used as an archive for around forty years. Acquired by the city, the building has been restored to its original state, making it a unique place to visit and a witness to the architectural translation of the ideology of prison history.

=== A rare example of prison architecture that can be visited and showcased ===
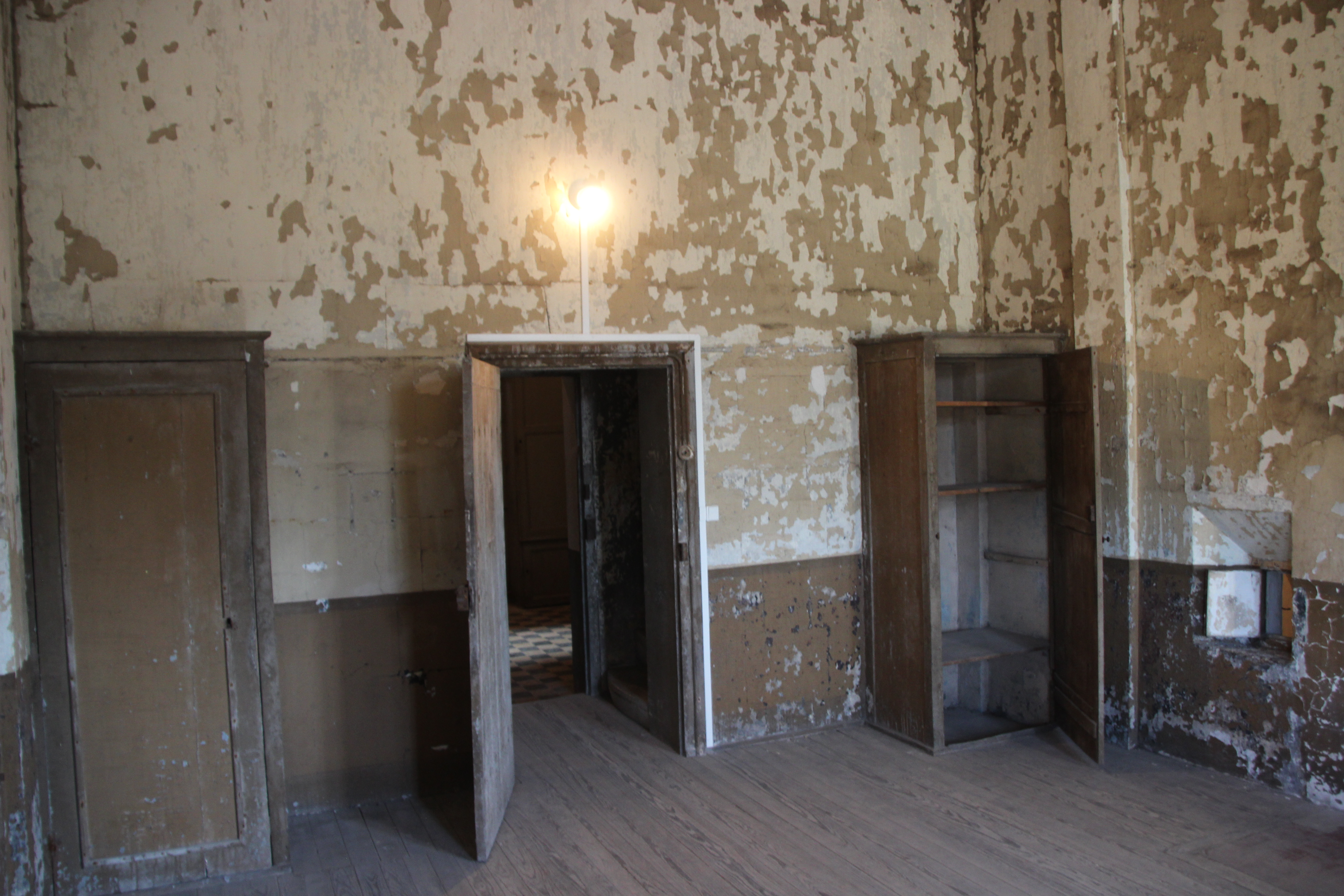
One of the old cells restored to its original condition.

The building was acquired by the city in 2005 and made "watertight and airtight", but the interior architecture remained unchanged. In fact, the building's interior remains in its original state, making it a "rare case of prison heritage enhancement". A major restoration project was carried out between September 2008 and June 2009 to restore the roofs and façades to their original state, based on documents held in the Calvados departmental archives, at a total cost of over €500,000. The work also involved the cladding of the façades and the replacement of stonework on the base of the building, which had suffered from damp. Windows in the half-tower were also restored during the same operation. In 2010, the intermunicipality also acquired the courthouse for use as a music school.

The building is managed by the Dominicans. Visits are organized by the town's cultural office, particularly during the European Heritage Days since 2006 and during the summer, with some success, as well as on the first Saturday of each month.

=== Prison built at a turning point in the evolution of prison theories ===
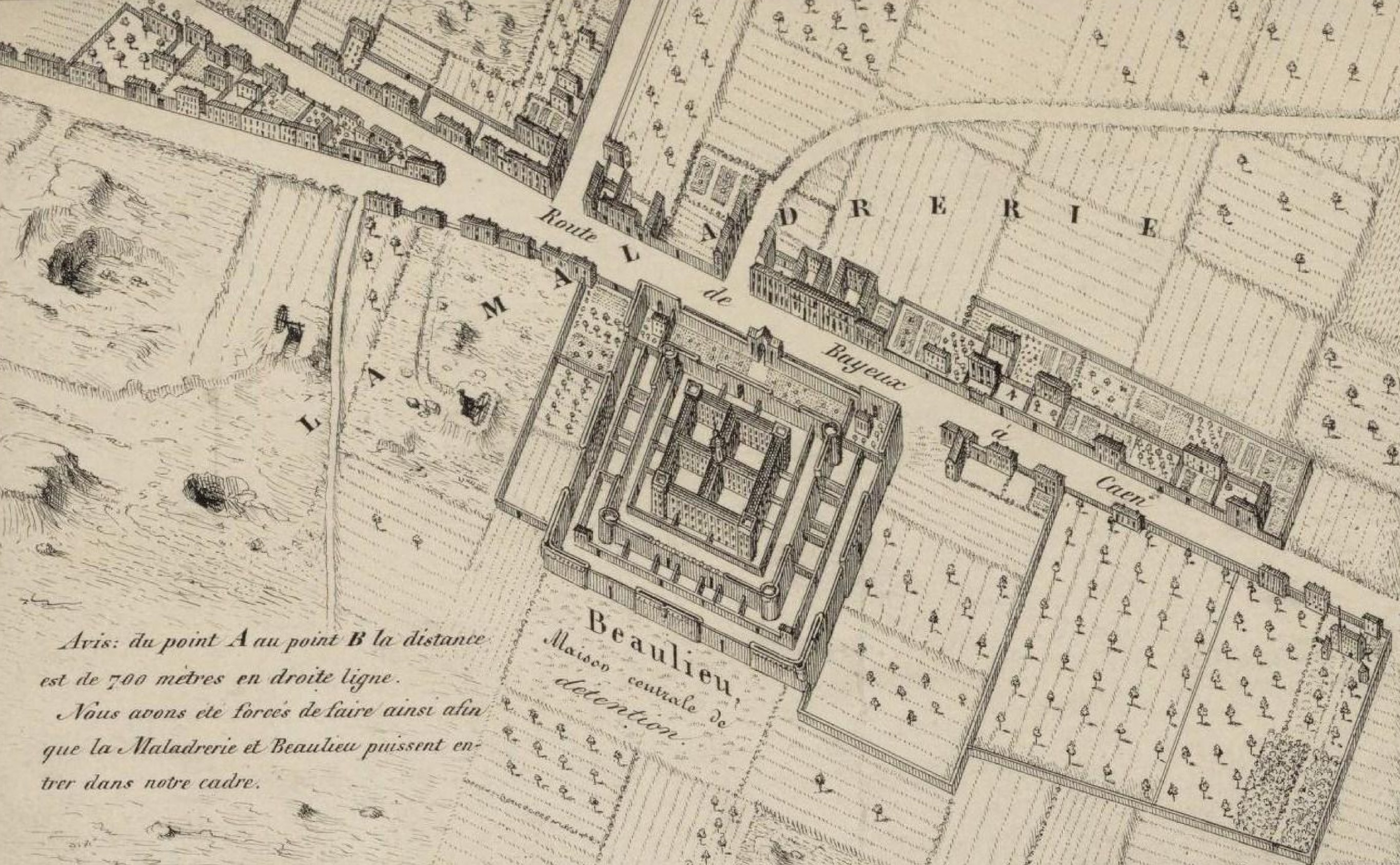
Lecointe's plan of the Beaulieu prison in Caen, circa 1850.

Later prisons were built in accordance with the Pennsylvanian regime, where inmates were isolated, as at the Caen prison. The prison is the tool of "a prison system respectful of new human rights", and the individual cell has a redemptive purpose. The Philadelphian system was adopted in France in 1841, with 9 m² cells, walkways and visiting rooms. The architecture of the buildings was circular or semicircular to facilitate surveillance. Harou-Romain theorized about a circular panoptic prison model, and proposed an "agricultural cellular penitentiary" in 1847. 45 prisons followed this design from the mid-19th century onwards.

The Pont-l'Évêque prison, with its collective cells, did not obey Philadelphian principles, but its concerns were already present. It is "one of the last testimonies of the prison world as it was still conceived under the Ancien Régime, but where we can feel the first reflections of what it would become two decades later" and constitutes "an essential link in the history of French prison architecture".

The Pont-l'Évêque prison, "archetypal" of early 19th-century prisons apart from the episode of the "Joyeuse Prison" affair, is a commonplace place of detention, as Barbenchon and Dutour have shown, "a victim of the authorities' impassivity in the face of the inmates' situation: overcrowding, lack of hygiene, absence of psychological or moral help, let alone research into the reintegration of released prisoners". The paradox with the philanthropic ideal that prevailed when it was built is great, and provides food for thought on the situation of contemporary detention.

== See also ==
- Montluc prison, prison in Lyon also preserved.
