= Coudray-Rabut =

- Part of Pont-l'Évêque
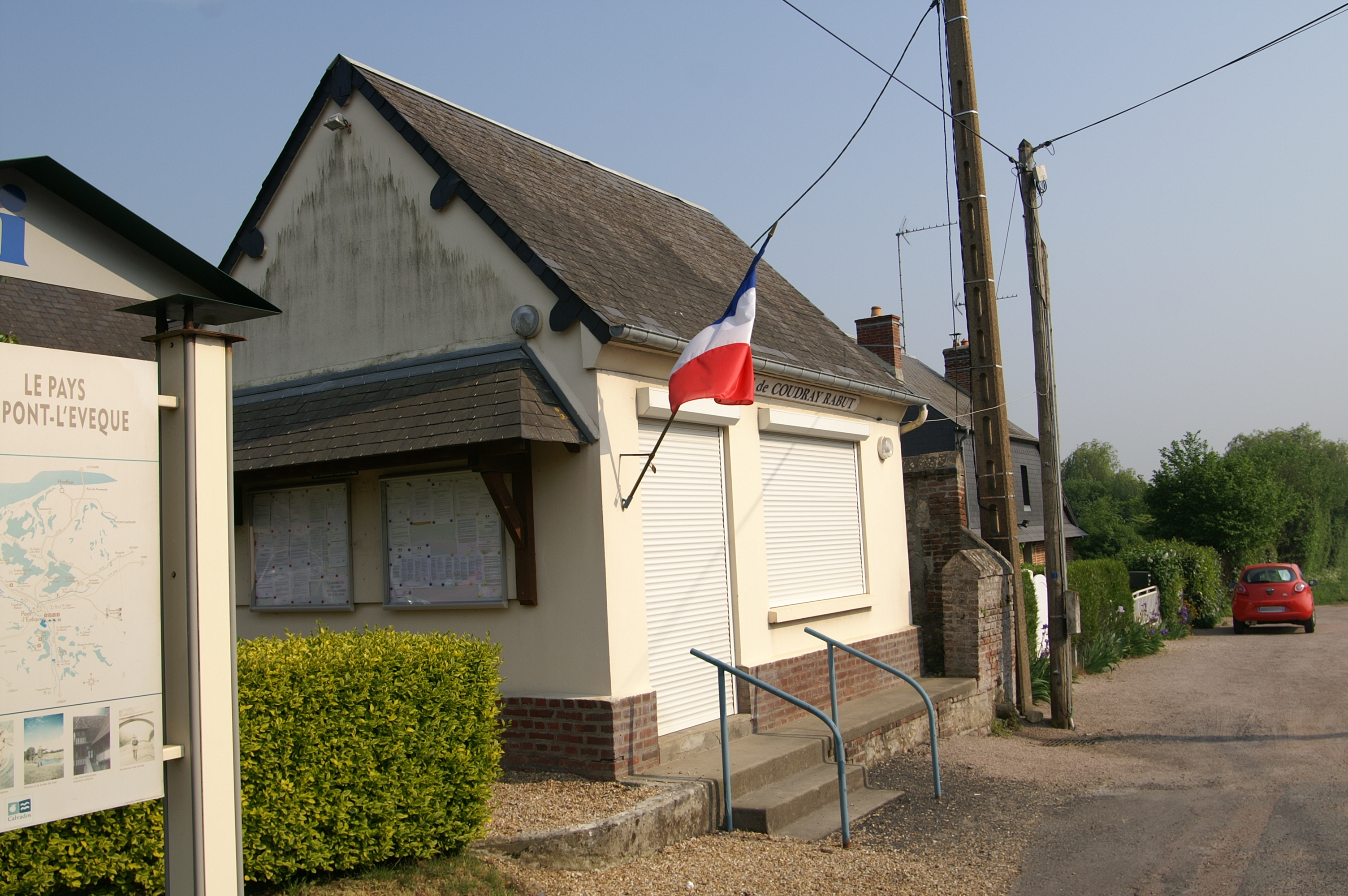
- Town hall
- Location of Coudray-Rabut
- Location within France Location within Normandy
- Coordinates: 49°18′22″N 0°11′11″E
- Country: France
- Region: Normandy
- Department: Calvados
- Arrondissement: Lisieux
- Canton: Pont-l'Évêque
- Commune: Pont-l'Évêque
- Area^{1}: 4.91 km^{2} (1.90 sq mi)
- Elevation: 18 m (59 ft)
- Highest elevation: 148 m (486 ft)
- Lowest elevation: 5 m (16 ft)
- Population (2016): 322
  - Density: 65.6/km^{2} (170/sq mi)
- Time zone: UTC+01:00 (CET)
  - Summer (DST): UTC+02:00 (CEST)
- Postal code: 14130
- ^{1} French Land Register data, which excludes lakes, ponds, glaciers > 1 km^{2} (0.386 sq mi or 247 acres) and river estuaries.

Coudray-Rabut (French pronunciation: [kudʁɛ ʁaby]) is a former commune in the Calvados department in the Normandy region in northwestern France. On 1 January 2019, it was merged into the commune Pont-l'Évêque.

== See also ==
- Communes of the Calvados department
