= Canapville, Calvados =

Canapville
- Commune
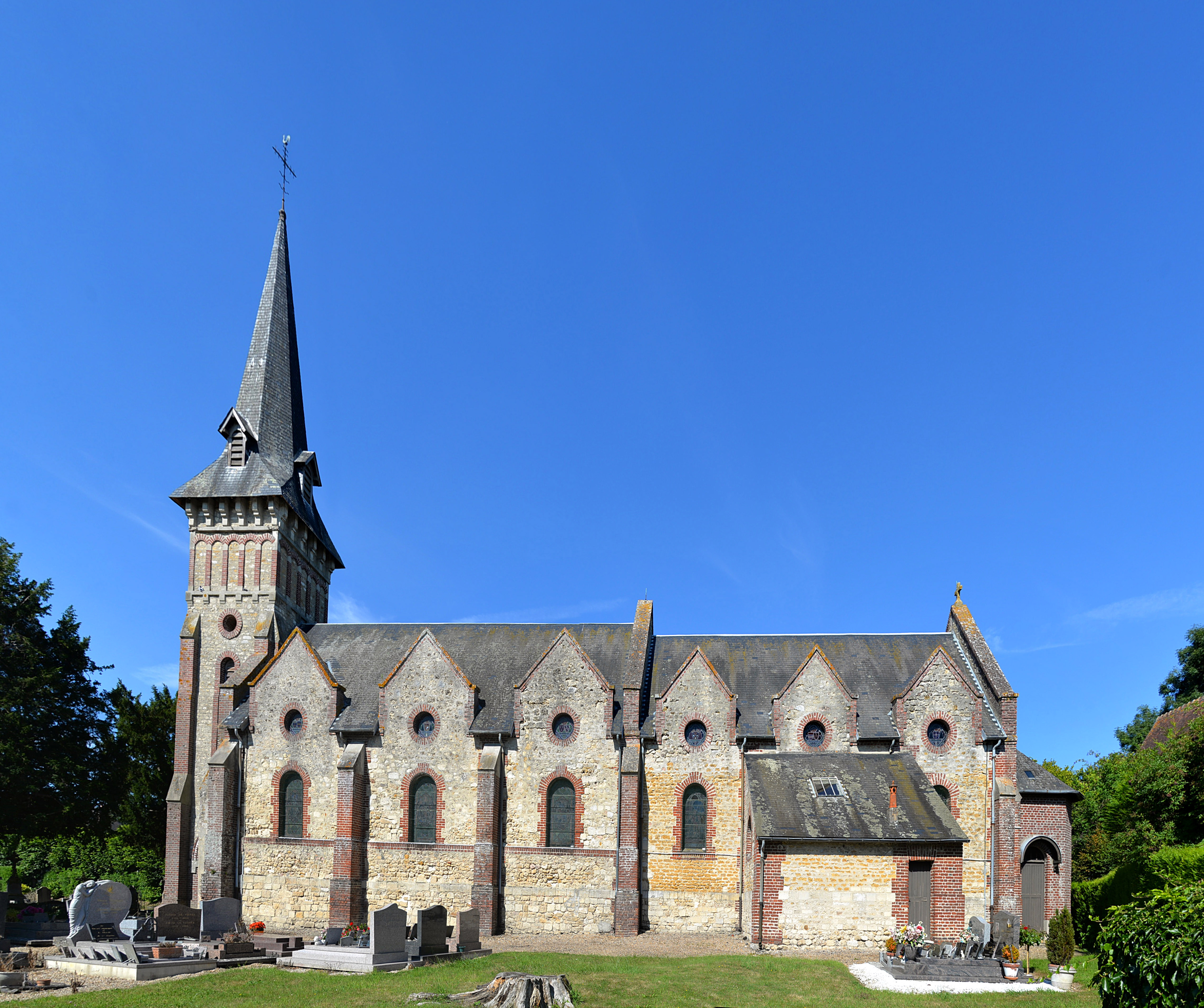
- The church in Canapville
- Location of Canapville
- Location within France Location within Normandy
- Coordinates: 49°19′03″N 0°08′10″E
- Country: France
- Region: Normandy
- Department: Calvados
- Arrondissement: Lisieux
- Canton: Pont-l'Évêque
- Intercommunality: CC Terre d'Auge

Government
  - Mayor (2020–2026): Stéphane Tonon
- Area^{1}: 2.5 km^{2} (0.97 sq mi)
- Elevation: 11 m (36 ft)
- Highest elevation: 115 m (377 ft)
- Lowest elevation: 3 m (9.8 ft)
- Population (2023): 224
  - Density: 90/km^{2} (230/sq mi)
- Time zone: UTC+01:00 (CET)
  - Summer (DST): UTC+02:00 (CEST)
- INSEE/Postal code: 14131 /14800
- ^{1} French Land Register data, which excludes lakes, ponds, glaciers > 1 km^{2} (0.386 sq mi or 247 acres) and river estuaries.

Canapville (French pronunciation: [kanapvil]) is a commune in the Calvados department. It is located in the region of Normandy in northwestern France.

== Population ==
Historical population
Year	Pop.	±% p.a.
1968	170	—
1975	182	+0.98%
1982	188	+0.46%
1990	185	−0.20%
1999	222	+2.05%
2007	239	+0.93%
2012	209	−2.65%
2017	233	+2.20%
2023	224	−0.65%
Source: INSEE

== See also ==
- Communes of the Calvados department
