= Saint-Brieuc Cathedral =

Cathedral in Saint-Brieuc, France

Saint-Brieuc Cathedral Basilique-Cathédrale Saint-Étienne de Saint-Brieuc
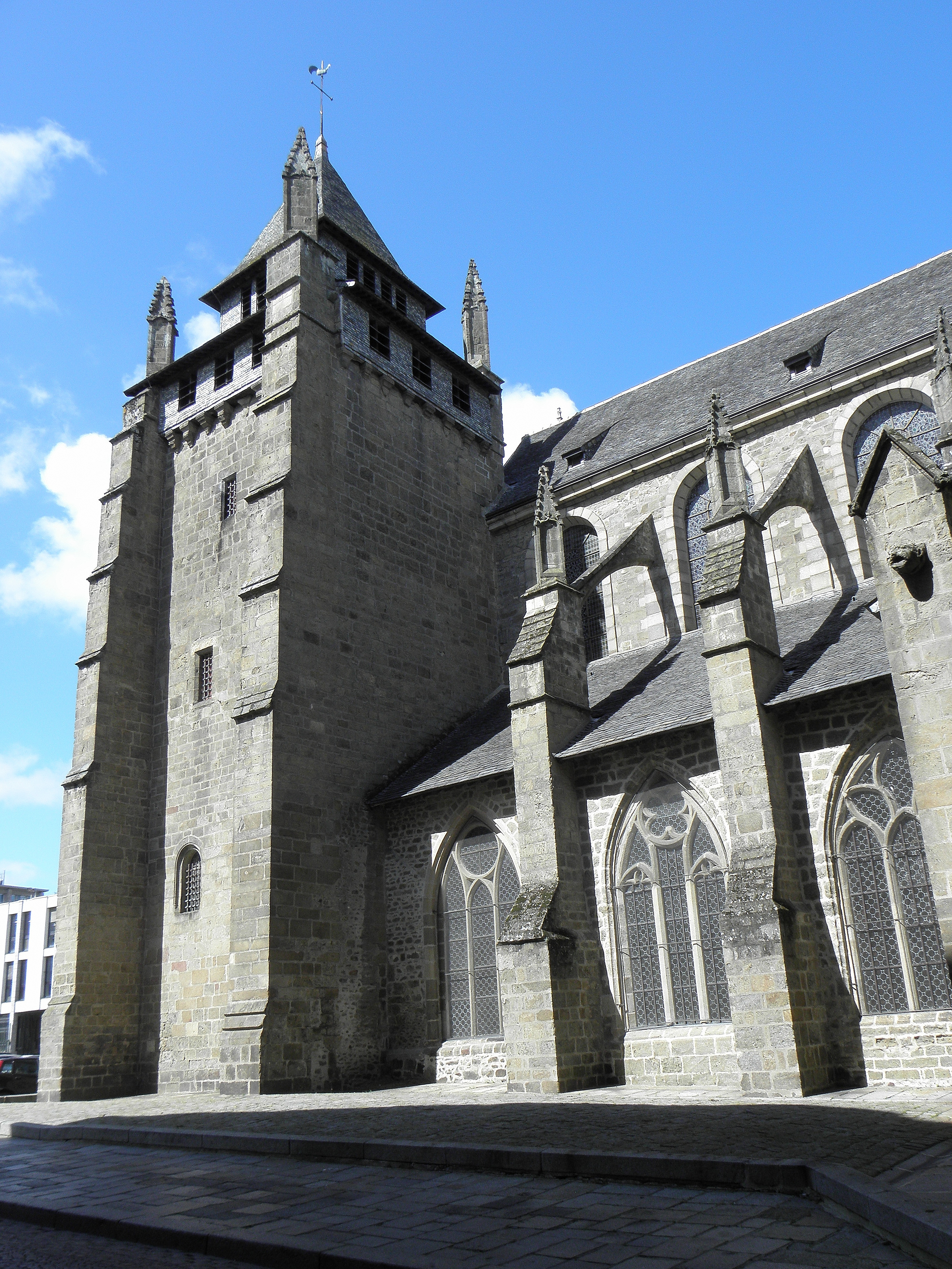
- Saint-Brieuc Cathedral

Religion
- Affiliation: Roman Catholic Church
- Region: Côtes-d'Armor
- Rite: Roman
- Ecclesiastical or organisational status: Cathedral
- Status: Active

Location
- Location: Saint-Brieuc, France
- Interactive map of Saint-Brieuc Cathedral; Basilique-Cathédrale Saint-Étienne de Saint-Brieuc
- Coordinates: 48°30′49″N 2°45′55″W

Architecture
- Type: church
- Groundbreaking: 12th century
- Completed: 20th century

Saint-Brieuc Cathedral (French: Basilique-Cathédrale Saint-Étienne de Saint-Brieuc; Breton: Bazilikenn-Iliz-veur Sant-Etien, Sant-Brieg) is a Roman Catholic church located in the town of Saint-Brieuc, Brittany, France, and dedicated to Saint Stephen.

The cathedral is the seat of the Bishop of Saint-Brieuc and Tréguier. It was declared a minor basilica on 3 September 1875. It is a listed monument historique since 1906.

== Introduction ==
The Cathėdrale St-Étienne on the Place du Gėnėral de Gaulle in Saint-Brieuc served as a church-fortress ("cathédrale-forteresse"). The central porch is flanked by two sturdy towers: the 14th-century Tour Brieuc. which is 92 feet high and the 15th-century Tour Marie, which is 108 feet in height. These towers have loop-holes and machicolations which would have allowed the use of a variety of defensive weapons and are supported by stout buttresses. The two arms of the transept jut far out and are protected by towers with pepper-pot roofs. Although stripped of many of its treasures by the zealots of the French Revolution, it still holds many artifacts and works of art. The Chapelle de l'Annonciation has, for example, a baroque altarpiece and the organ was built by Cavaillé-Coll, famous for having built the organ in the Church of Saint-Sulpice in Paris. The south arm of the transept is lit by 15th-century stained-glass windows and the tomb of Saint-Guillaume is amongst the many tombs and enfeu scattered throughout the building. The cathedral has an 18th-century pulpit and Stations of the Cross carved in 1958 by Georges Saupique.

Brieuc was born in the 5th or 6th-century in Wales and at an early age was entrusted to the care of Saint Germain. He stayed in Germain's monastery until he reached the age of twenty-four when he was made a priest. He decided to travel to the Armorican peninsula and set off with a group of monks, his mission to convert the local people to Christianity. He founded a monastery at what is now Tréguier but when called back to Wales because of a terrible plague there, he left his nephew Tugdual in charge. When he returned he found Tugdual totally in control and set off along the Léguer estuary, landed where Saint-Brieuc stands today and founded a monastery after firstly setting up a modest oratory. Later he had the first cathedral built and took the role of bishop for himself.

== History of the cathedral ==
The first church or oratory on this site was built in wood in the 6th century, and a replacement building was erected in around 970. Nothing remains today of these two constructions. The 10th century saw many attacks on Saint-Brieuc by the Normans, so much so that the relics of Saint-Brieuc which had been kept here were moved to the Saint-Serge Abbey in Angers for protection.

The building we see today was commenced in around 1180 during the episcopacy of Bishop Geffroy de Hénon and building was well advanced when in 1212 Bishop Pierre was buried at the base of the Tour Brieuc. Pierre had brought the Saint-Brieuc relics back to the town from Angers in October 1210.

Work on the building's west façade continued under the bishopric of Monseigneur Guillaume Pinchon from his arrival in 1220 to his exile to Poitiers in 1228 following Pinchon's conflict with Pierre Mauclerc. When he returned in 1231, he had a chapel built on the south side of the building, this dedicated to Saint Mathurin. His wish was to be buried in the chapel and this happened in 1234. The construction work was finished by Pinchon's successor Philippe before his departure to the Holy Land in 1248. It was Bishop Philippe who moved to have Pinchon canonised on 12 April 1247.

Over one hundred years later the cathedral suffered much damage at the hands of the English during the destructive War of the Breton Succession and then by a fire at the end of 1353. After the fire, Bishop Guy de Montfort made the reconstruction a priority and started work on the choir which was completed between 1354 and 1357. Under de Montfort's successor, Hugues de Montrelais, whose bishopric ran from 1357 to 1375, the new cathedral was finished, but in 1394 the town was under siege again, this time by Olivier de Clisson and again was badly damaged. Now Bishop Guillaume Angier took charge of the reconstruction necessary and apart from the reconstruction of the choir, he finalised the long-awaited construction of the Tour Marie. Then Bishop Jean de Malestroit reconstructed the gable of the north wing of the transept and had a window installed there, destroyed by the storm of 1735. By the beginning of the 15th century, the cathedral was finished and between 1460 and 1472, Bishop John Prigent began the construction of the chapel of the Annunciation. Finally, the nineteenth and twentieth centuries saw much restoration and important works including the repair of the vaulting and work on the window framing. The cathedral had to be rebuilt on many occasions this as a consequence of military attacks or natural disasters.

== Some images of the cathedral exterior ==
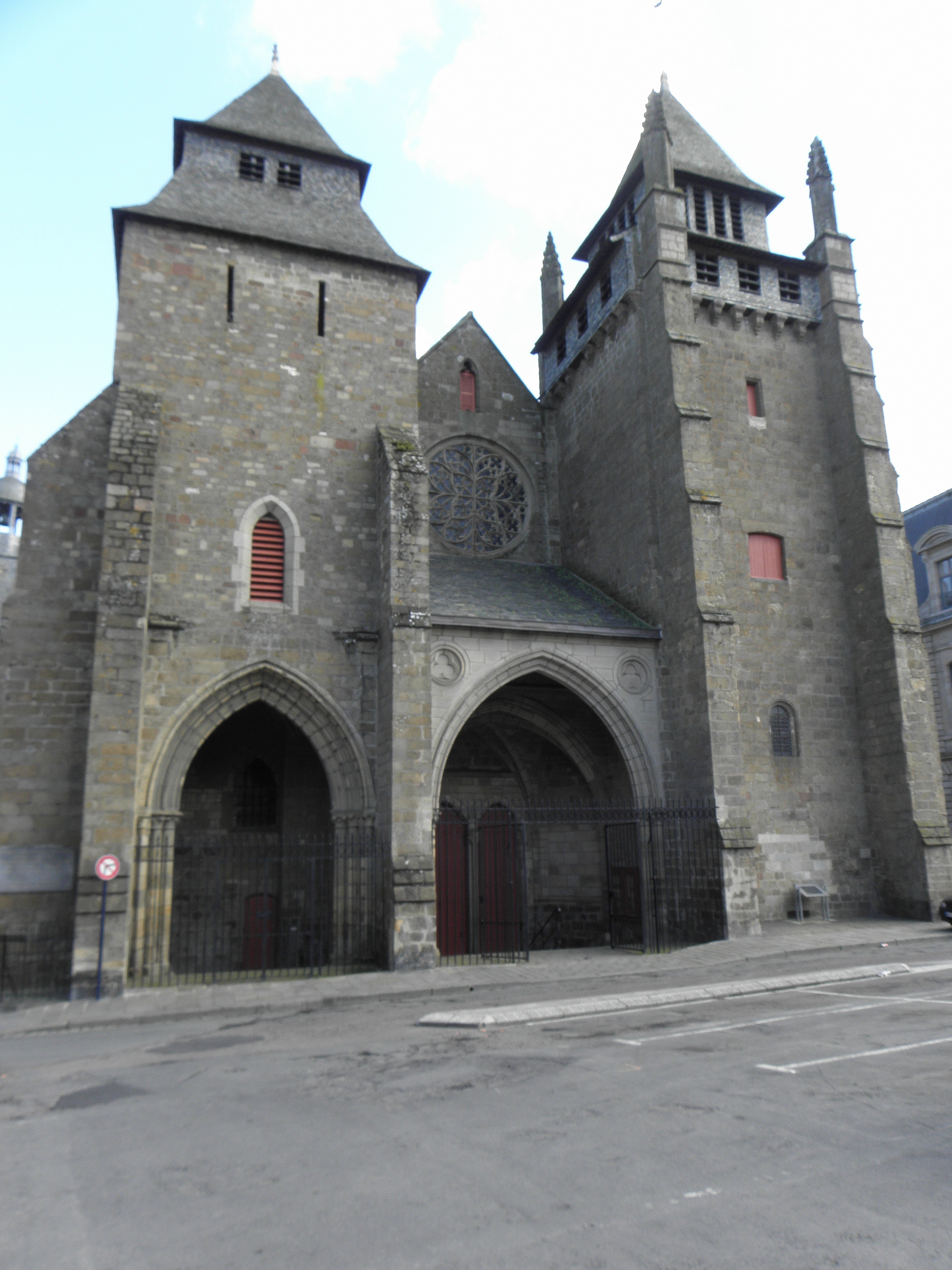
The western face of the Cathédrale Saint-Étienne in Saint-Brieuc.

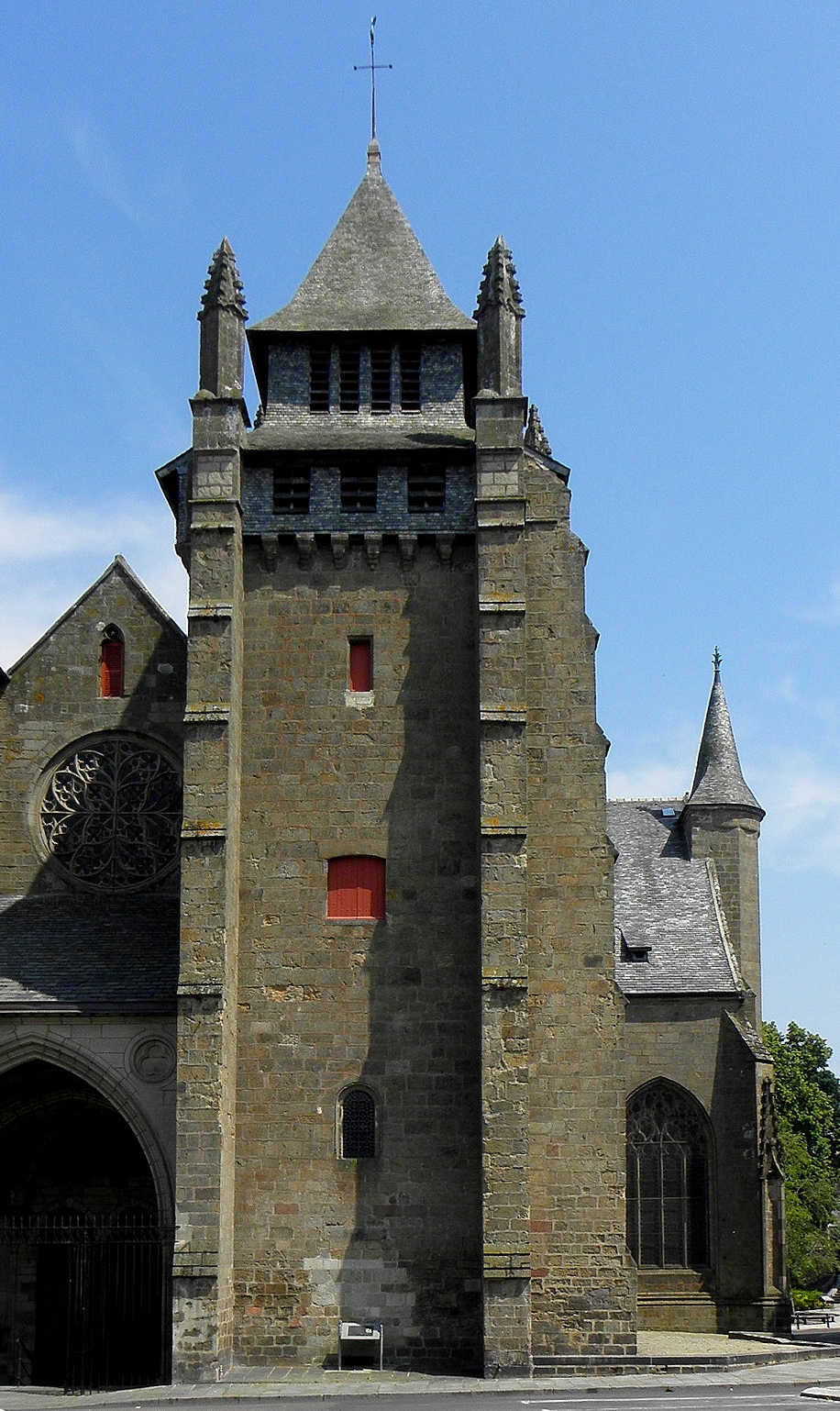
The "Tour Marie" of the Cathédrale Saint-Étienne in Saint-Brieuc.

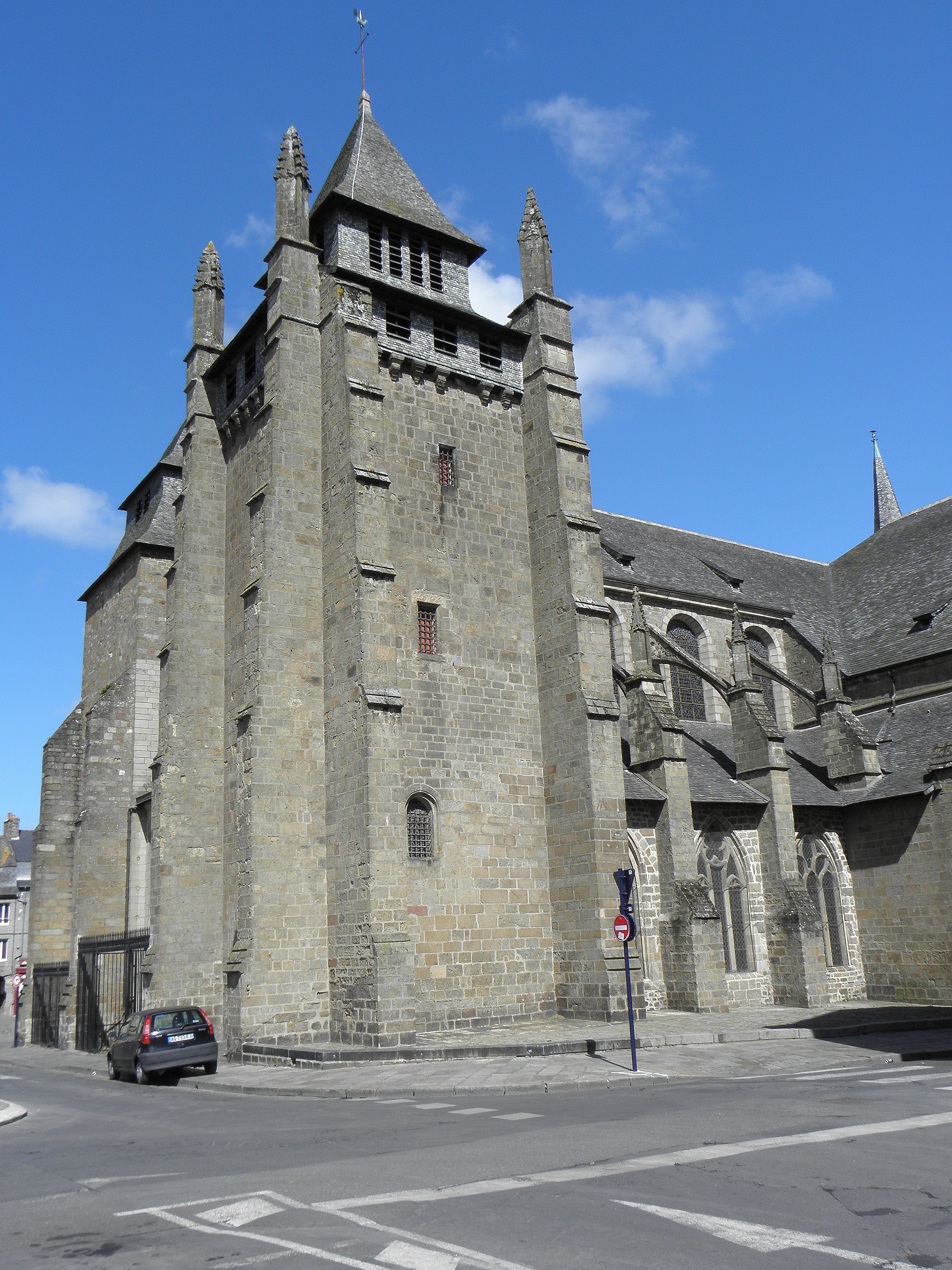
The "Tour Marie" and the southern flank of the Cathédrale Saint-Étienne in Saint-Brieuc

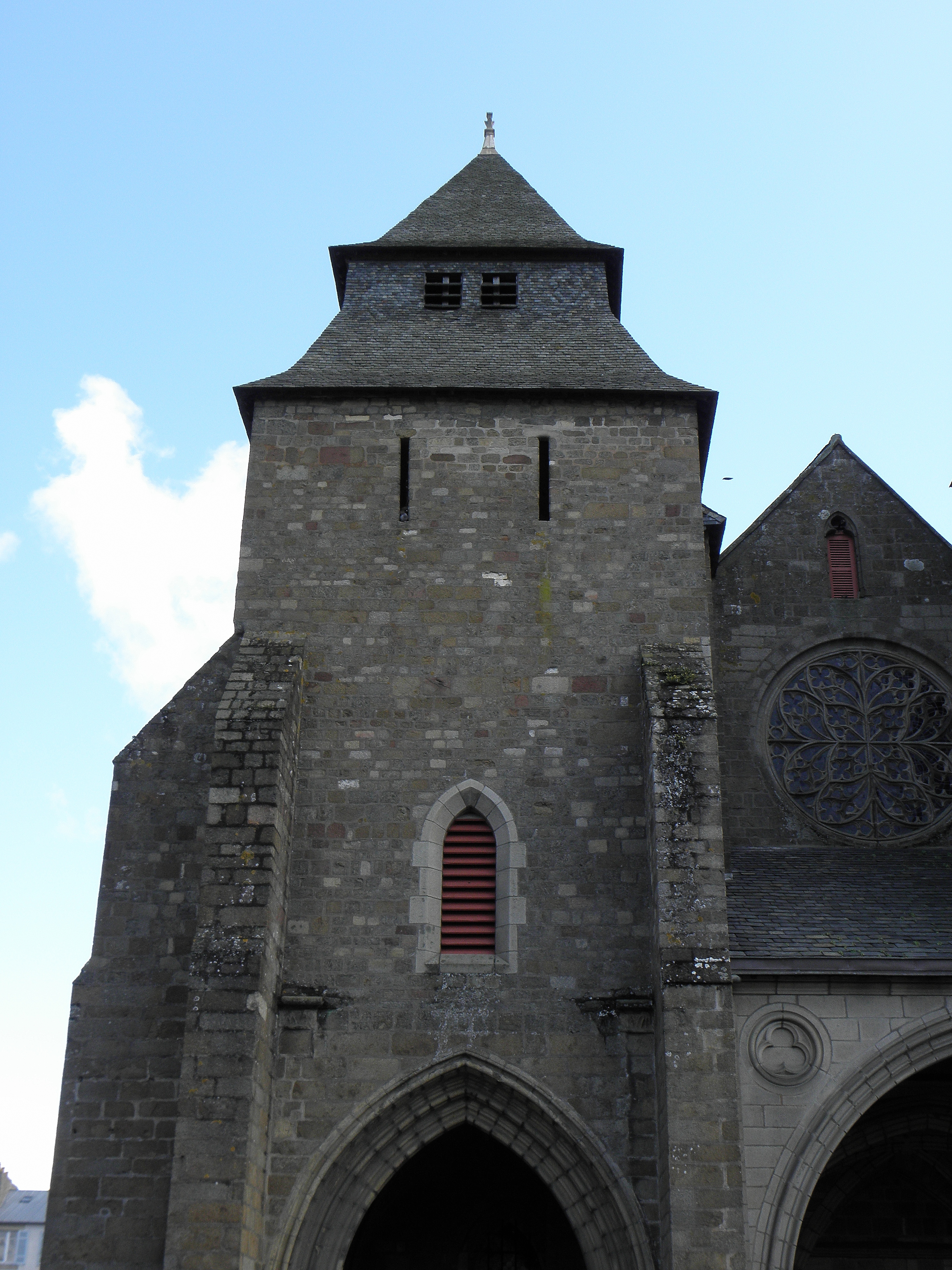
The "Tour Brieuc" of the Cathédrale Saint-Étienne in Saint-Brieuc

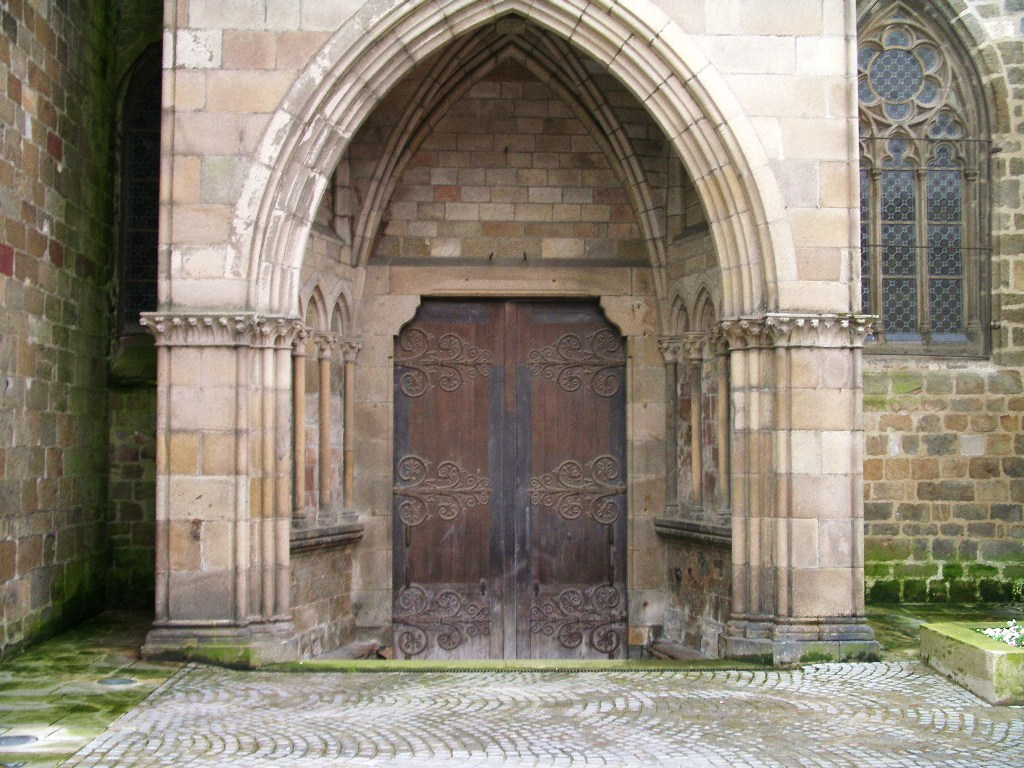
The "Porte du Martray" of the Cathédrale Saint-Étienne in Saint-Brieuc. Ironwork by Pierre François Marie Boulanger

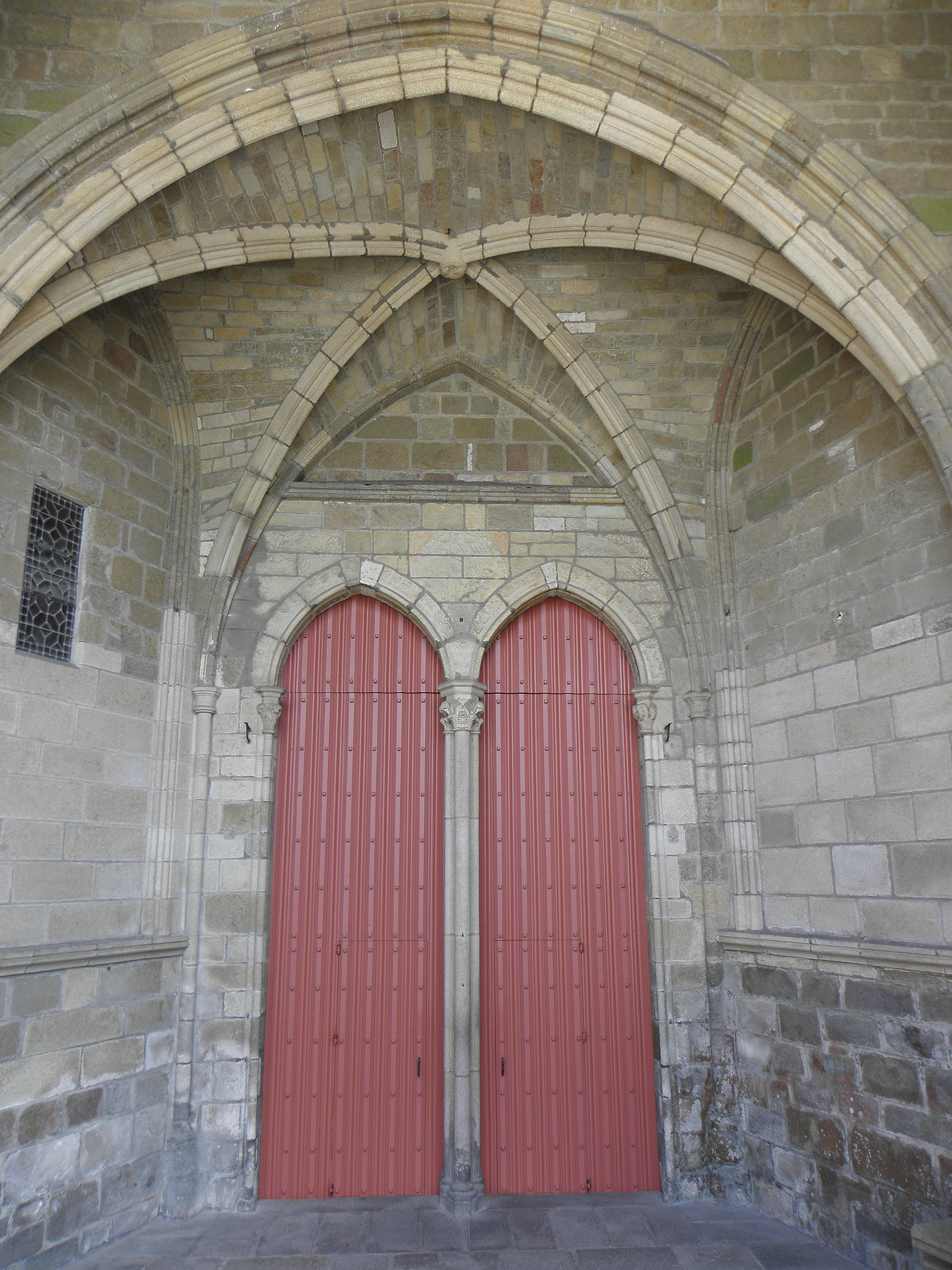
The central portal of the western face of the Cathédrale Saint-Étienne in Saint-Brieuc

== The cathedral interior ==
The remains of many canons of the cathedral are buried under the paving of the south aisle of the nave and an enfeu holds the tomb of Monseigneur Le Porc de la Porte who died in 1632 and was bishop at Saint-Brieuc from 1618 to 1632. The gisant on the tomb dates to the 17th century. This tomb came to the cathedral in 1833 when the Ursulines chapel had been destroyed. Le Porc de la Porte had founded that chapel. The nave has seven crossings with aisles and to the right of the fourth crossing is the Chapelle des Fonts Baptismaux which has a 16th-century granite font decorated by Alain de Léon. The chapel contains an oil painting depicting John the Baptist at work. To the right of the last three crossings is the Chapelle de l'Annonciation whilst along the north side of the nave is the Porche du Martray and the Sacristy. The transept has two symmetrical wings and the main altar stands on a platform in the centre. The north wing of the transept had fenestration dating to the early 15th century, but this was destroyed in a huge storm in 1735. The windows were replaced in 1852 and restored in the 20th century. The Choir is surrounded by a circular ambulatory from which emerge various side chapels

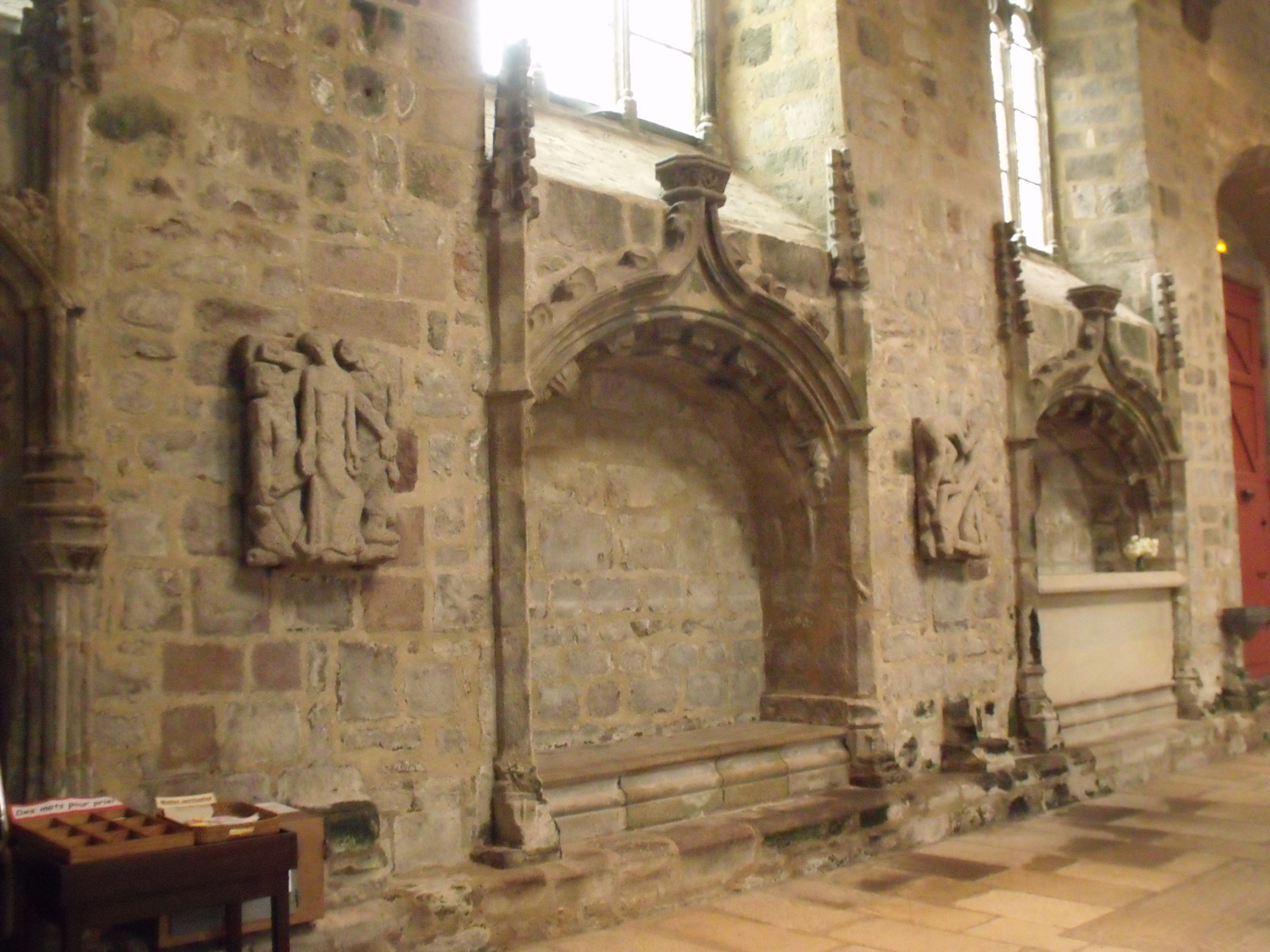
A view along the nave of Saint Etienne cathedral in Saint-Brieuc. Note the enfeu or walled tombs and two of Saupique's "stations of the Cross"

== The cathedral exterior ==
Inside the west porch, six steps lead down to the floor of the nave and a view of the altar erected at the crossing of the transept. The west porch was first built in the 15th century at the time the south tower was erected and was completely rebuilt in 1888. The west porch gable dates to the 13th century but was reworked in the 14th century and a rose window was added in the 16th century. Two doors give access to the cathedral, and the trumeau is decorated with a standing Virgin Mary which came from the Chapelle Saint-Colomban in Peumerit-Quintin. The North porch is known as the "du Matray" and was reconstructed in 1856. The tympanum is decorated with "Une Vierge à l'oiseau" in polychromed wood. The Sacristy was added between the arm of the transept and the north aisle of the nave in the 15th century.The north gable of the transept has a large window destroyed during the French Revolution and completely replaced in 1852. It is topped by a clock tower dating to 1836 which replaced an earlier tower dated 1618. The cathedral has two towers. The Tour du Nordic or the Tour Brieuc is 28 metres high and holds two bells. The Tour du Midi is higher at 33 metres and holds three bells. The latter tower was built in the 15th-century partly as a consequence of the sieges of 1375 and 1394 and its spire was added in 1852. The gable of the north transept built with much red granite quarried in the local area has a modern window, the old window having been destroyed in the French revolution. The gable is topped by an 18th-century clock, and for many years this was the only clock in the town. The chevet has a small door called the "Porte de la Vierge". Above the door is a small window to a room which served as the chapter prison. The gable of the south transept has an ornate 15th-century window in the "flamboyant" style an addition which owed much to the generosity of Olivier de Clisson.

== The choir, the ambulatory and surrounding chapels ==
The master altar is located in the centre of the transept and the choir area is surrounded by an ambulatory with 12th-century stylobates and columns which give access to various side chapels. On the "gospel" side or north side of the choir, the first side chapel is the Chapelle Saint-Giles. This chapel dates back to the 14th century, was reconstructed in the 16th century and was founded by Blanche d'Avaugour, the Lady of Kergroix. It contains a stairway giving access to the upper floors. On the exterior wall is a tomb thought to be the burial place of Bishop Guillaume VI Anger who died in 1404. His episcopacy commenced in 1385. The second is the Chapelle des Morts de la Guerre and then what was the Chapelle de Montfort which is no longer in use. Third is the chevet and the apsidal chapel called La Chapelle Notre-Dame de la Cherche, also called the Chapelle de la Vierge. It was constructed in 1343 by Roland de Dinan and Clémence d'Avaugour replacing an 11th-century chapel. On the left-hand side of the chapel entrance, there is an alabaster statue of the Virgin Mary with child. The child holds a bird in his right hand. On the right-hand side of the entrance is another statue of the Virgin Mary in gilded wood. It dates to the 18th century. The windows in the chapel are of 19th-century vintage save for the central window, which is by the stained glass artist Hubert de Sainte-Marie. The chapel has two tombs set within its walls. On the north wall is the tomb of Guillaume Beschard, who was the bishop from 1379 to 1385, and on the south wall the tomb of Guy Eder, the bishop from 1428 to 1431. Facing the apsidal chapel is the tomb of Canon François de Boisgelin which dates to 1633.

On the south side of the ambulatory is the Chapelle Sainte-Anne, which was established by Christophe de Penmarc'h between 1471 and 1505. De Penmarc'h arms can be seen in the keystone of the chapel's vaulting. The chapel contains a marble statue of Monseigneur Augustin David. David was the bishop at Saint-Brieuc for 20 years. He had a great interest in the arts and founded the local Societé d'émulation d'archéologie et d'histoire in 1861. His tomb was carved from white marble by Henri Chapu in 1891.

The altar is made from wood and has a work by Elie Le Goff entitled "Saint-Brieuc et le miracle des loups" which dates to 1891. The chapel was built by Bishop Christophe de Penmarc'h. In the chapel, there are also traces of the tomb of Alain de Penmarc'h who was Christophe's nephew and a canon at Saint-Brieuc and the tombstone of canon Rolland de la Fruglaye who died on 1 September 1454.

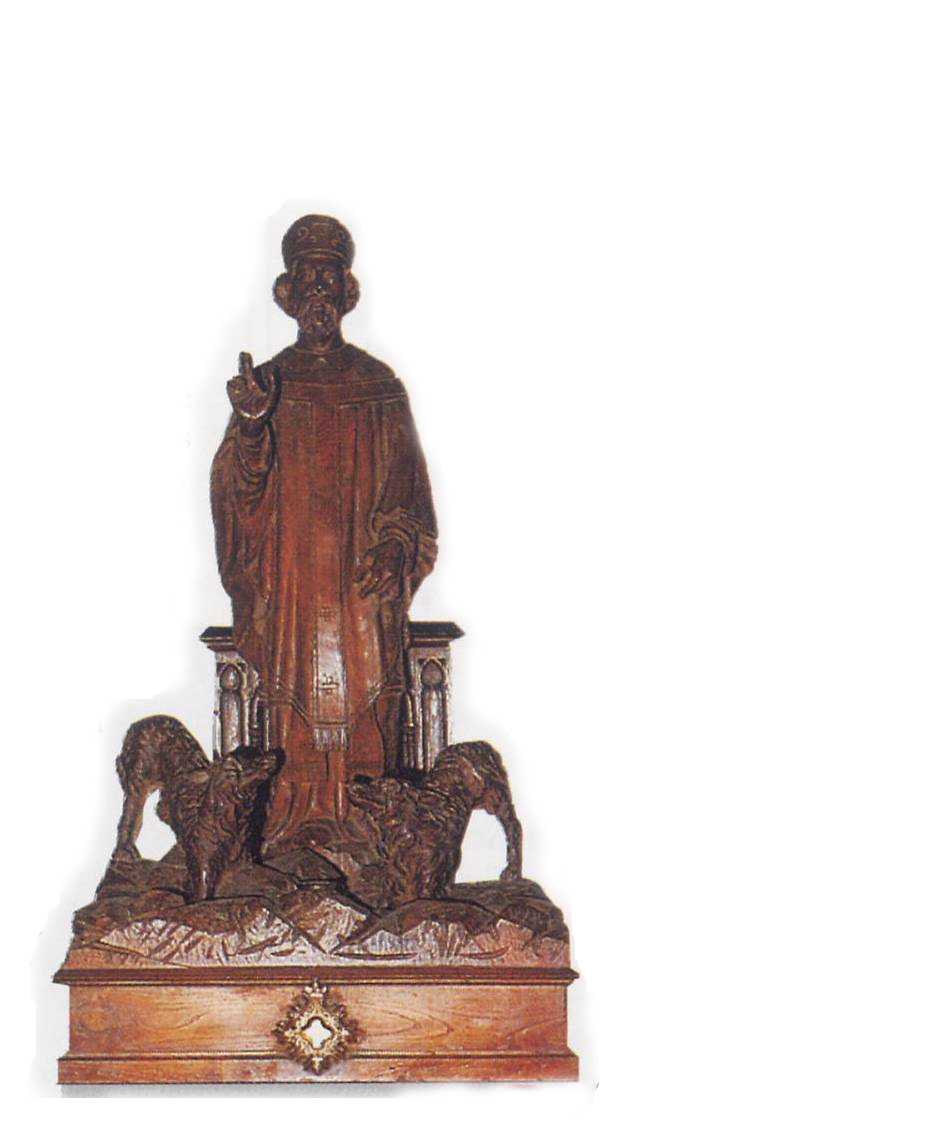
Statue of Saint-Brieuc by Elie le Goff dated 1891. In old age, St. Brieuc is said to have been travelling in a cart, singing hymns together with a group of monks walking alongside, when suddenly they were surrounded by a pack of wolves. His companions fled, but Brieuc confronted the beasts with the sign of the cross offered in benediction and they knelt before him humbly.

The next chapel is the Chapelle Saint Yves which dates to the 15th century and was commissioned by Christophe de Penmarc'h and his brother Louis. De Penmarc'h's coat of arms can be seen in the vaulting keystone. The chapel contains the 19th-century tombstone of Monseigneur Bouché and a 19th-century black bronze figure of Christ by Just André François Becquet, the French sculptor born in Besançon in 1829 and who died in Paris in 1907. There is also a statue of Saint-Yves dating to 1892 by the sculptor Jean-Marie Valentin.

The Chapelle des Reliques is the final chapel off the south side of the choir and can be traced back to the 13th century. It is accessed through a door in the Chapelle Saint Yves. Originally a courtyard, it was roofed over in the 14th century and was known as the "Petite Trésorerie". In 1897 Monseigneur Fallières transformed it into a chapel to hold relics. The ornate reliquaries held within date to the 19th century and are said to contain a piece of the actual cross ("la Vraie Croix") and a thorn from the crown of thorns. The reliquaries also contain the skull of Saint Guillaume and a relic of Saint Brieuc. The chapel is secured by an ornate iron gate.

== The Chapelle de l'Annonciation or Saint-Sacrement ==
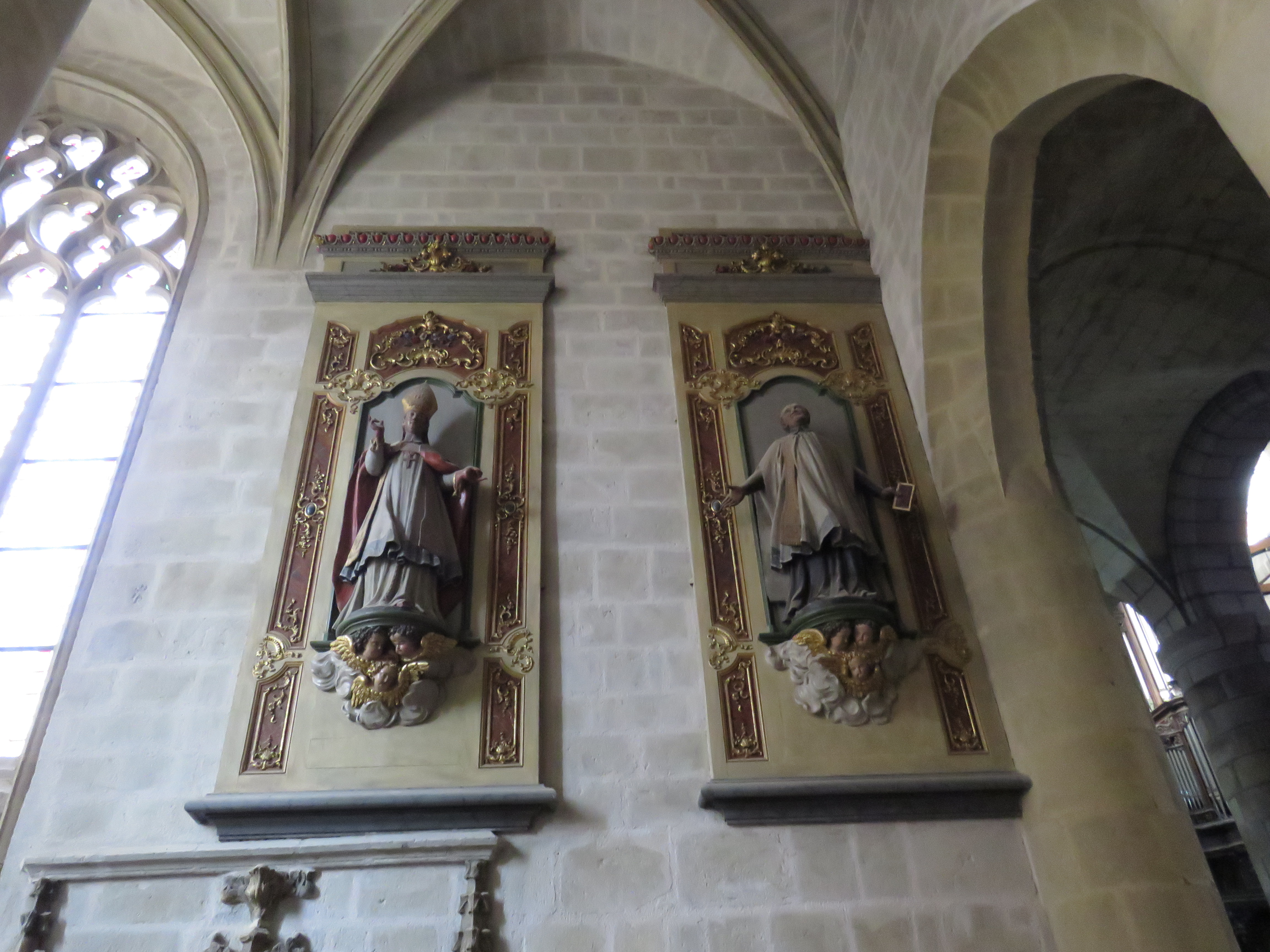
The statues of Saint-François de Sales and Saint-Vincent-de-Paul

Originally the chapel was dedicated to Saint-Guillaume or Saint-Mathurin and was built between 1462 and 1472 on the initiative of the bishop Jean Prigent, this confirmed by a shield decorating the door in the south of the chapel which bears Prigent's arms. Prigent's work on the chapel was completed by his successor Pierre de Laval (1472–1477). The altar "Autel du Saint-Sacrement" dates from the 18th century and was restored in 1977. It was executed by the sculptor Yves Corlay and has panels with relief carvings of the resurrection and the ascension in the central panel. The altar is decorated with statues of the Angel Gabriel, and the Virgin Mary as well as Saint Michael and the guardian angel. On the wall opposite are statues of a mitred Saint-François de Sales on the left and Saint-Vincent-de-Paul on the right. These two saints were founders of the "Congrégation des Dames de la Croix". The altar had been made originally for the chapel of the "Filles de la Croix" and had been saved during the revolution. As with many baroque altars there is a mirror placed above the altar placed between two angels. It is in the Saint-Sacrement chapel that one sees the enfeus of Monseigneur Le Mée and Monseigneur Fretat de Boissieux.

== The chapel of Saint Guillaume ==
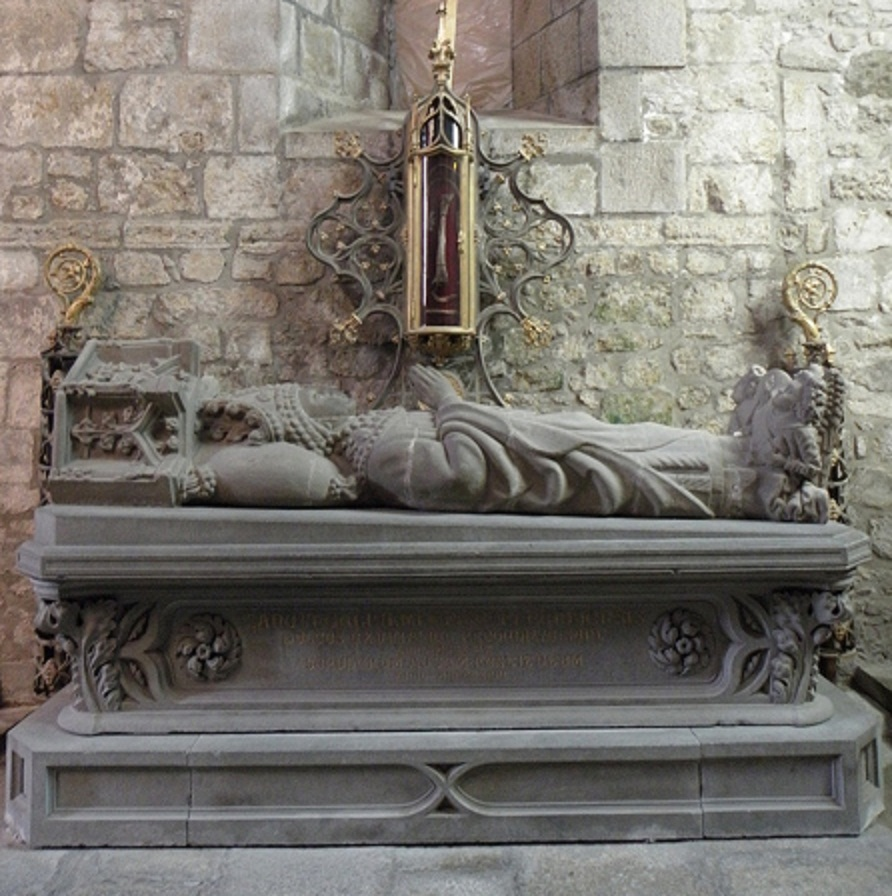
The tomb of Saint-Guillaume Pinchon, Bishop of Saint-Brieuc from 1220 to 1224. Note the elaborate reliquary above the gisant. Also, the two bishop's crooks fixed to the wall

Only in 1956 were Saint Guillaume's remains placed in this chapel which had in earlier times served as the baptistery. When in the 17th century the fonts were moved to a spot near to the Porche du Martray, the chapel was renamed the Chapelle de Saint-Joseph. The replacement tomb of Guillaume Pinchon can be seen in this chapel which was erected during the 12th and 13th century. The replacement tomb was the work of the sculptor Hernot of Lannion. Pinchon was responsible for much of the 13th-century construction of the cathedral. In earlier days his tomb which dated to the 15th century was located in the Chapelle de l'Annonciation but this was smashed during the revolution. A reliquary sits above the replacement tomb and contains relics of the saint. Also in this chapel is the tomb of Canon François de la Rue buried there in 1861 and the tomb of Monseigneur Martial with a statue by Ogé senior, one of his late works.

== The stained glass window of the south wing of the transept ==
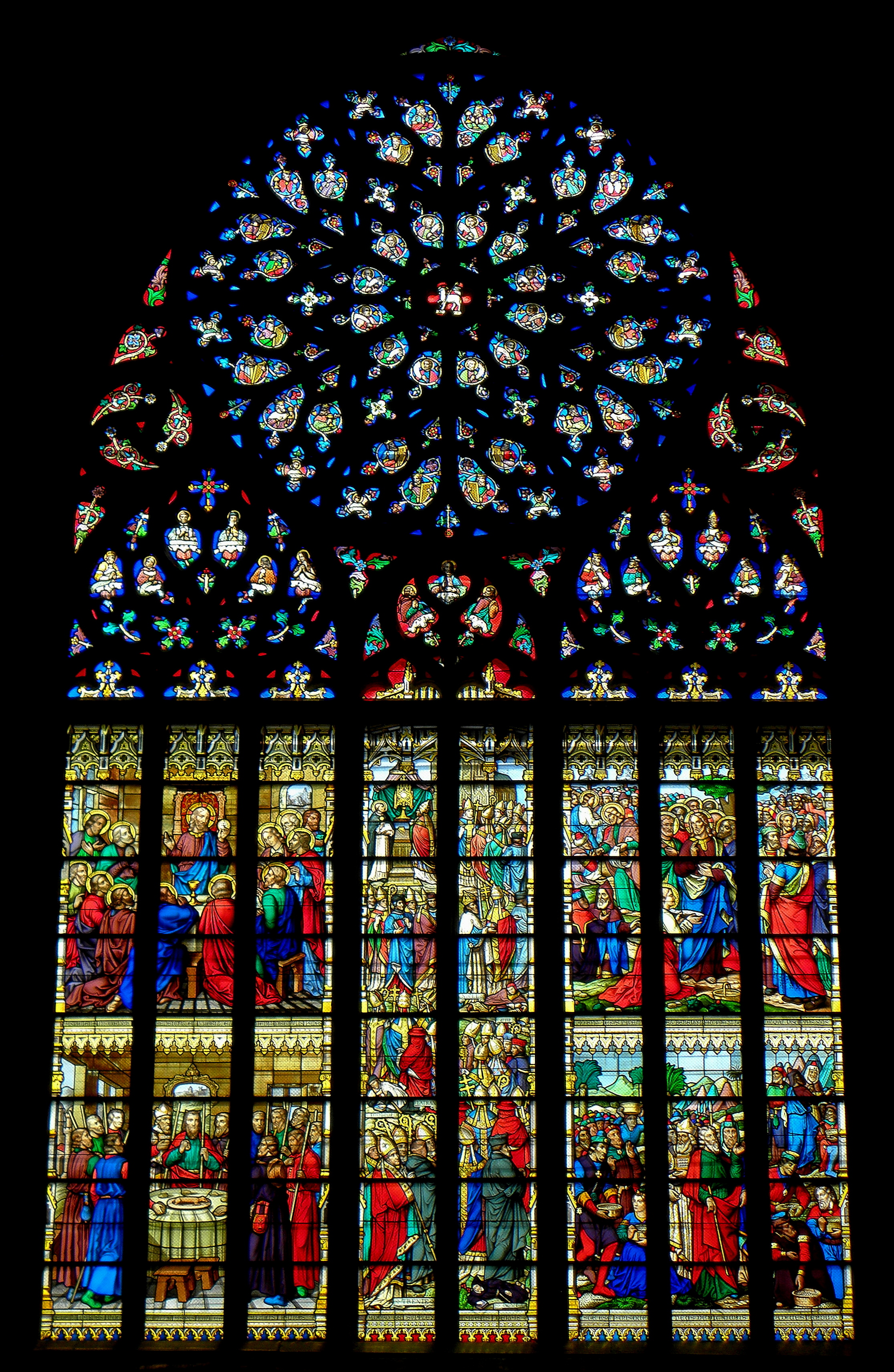
The rose window in the south transept. Further images of this eight lancet window with its elaborate tympanum can be seen at the end of the article The image top left depicts the story of manna in the desert and that top right depicts the feeding of the multitude. Bottom left is a depiction of the last supper and bottom right the story of the Easter lamb. In the centre the images deal with the treaty of Nicée, the "Fourth Council of the Lateran" and the "Council of Trent"

A statue of Saint-Yves has been placed on the wall nearby in recent years. It is a 16th-century work and was donated to the cathedral by a family in Chatelaudren. The fenestration itself dates to the 15th century whilst the stained glass window dates to 1863. It concentrates on the theme of the eucharist and the sacrement depicts various biblical stories; manna in the desert, the Feeding the multitude story, the Last Supper and the Easter lamb. The two central compartments recall the treaties of Nicée in 325, the Fourth Council of the Lateran in 1215 and the Council of Trent in 1545. Under this window are statues of John the Evangelist and Thomas Aquinas both dating to the 19th century.

== The stained glass window in the apsidal chapel the "Chapelle de la Vierge" ==
The cathedral's chevet was built in 1343 by Roland de Dinan and Clémence d'Avaugour. On each side of the chapel entrance are statues. One, on the left, depicts the Virgin Mary holding the baby Jesus who holds a bird in his hand. That on the right is an 18th-century statue of the Virgin Mary in gilded wood. The chapel window dates to the end of the 19th century. It depicts events from the life of the Virgin Mary. The panels from left to right depict Mary's birth, The Annunciation and the visit to Elizabeth, the Dormition and Assumption (this a modern piece the original having been destroyed accidentally), the Nativity, Jesus' presentation in the temple and Pope Pie IX proclaiming Mary's Immaculate Conception.

== Oil paintings ==
The cathedral has an oil painting of Pope Gregory 1 by the artist A Hubert dated 1827. There is also a painting of the "Sainte Famille" and the "Nativity". This painting dates to the 17th century and whilst the artist is not known it is said to be "after" Jean Jouvenet. Also in the cathedral are the paintings "Le martyr de saint Etienne" by A.d'Hardivillers and "Jesus et le paralytique" by P. Bisson.

== Tombs ==
The cathedral contains the tomb of Monseigneur Jacques Jean-Pierre Le Mée who was bishop of Saint-Brieuc and Tréguier from 1841 to 1858 succeeding Monseigneur Le Groing de la Romagère. He was the superior of the "Filles du Saint-Esprit", held a synod for them in 1851, and built a new seminary. He founded Saint-Brieuc's école Saint-Charles, Guingamp's Notre-Dame institute and the Saint-Joseph college at Quintin. He died on the 31 July 1858 at the age of 64. The effigy of Le Mée, kneeling at a prie-dieu was the work of Pierre-Marie-François Ogé and dates to 1859. The tomb stands in an enfeu originally holding the tomb of Jean Prigent who had built the chapel in 1472. This had been destroyed during the French Revolution.

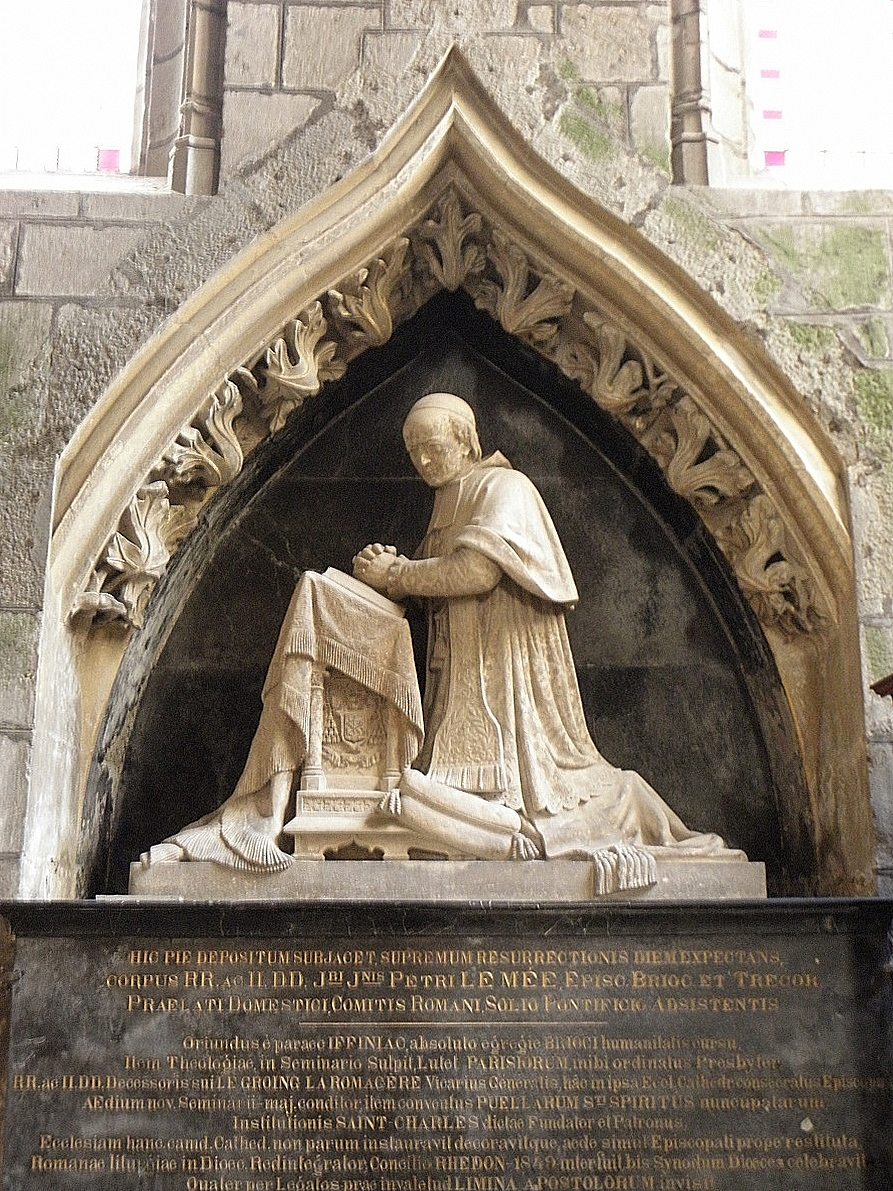
The tomb of Monseigneur Jacques Jean Pierre Le Mée

It also holds the tomb of Monseigneur Le Groing la Romagère. This elaborate tomb was the work of the sculptor Pierre-Marie-François Ogé in 1841.

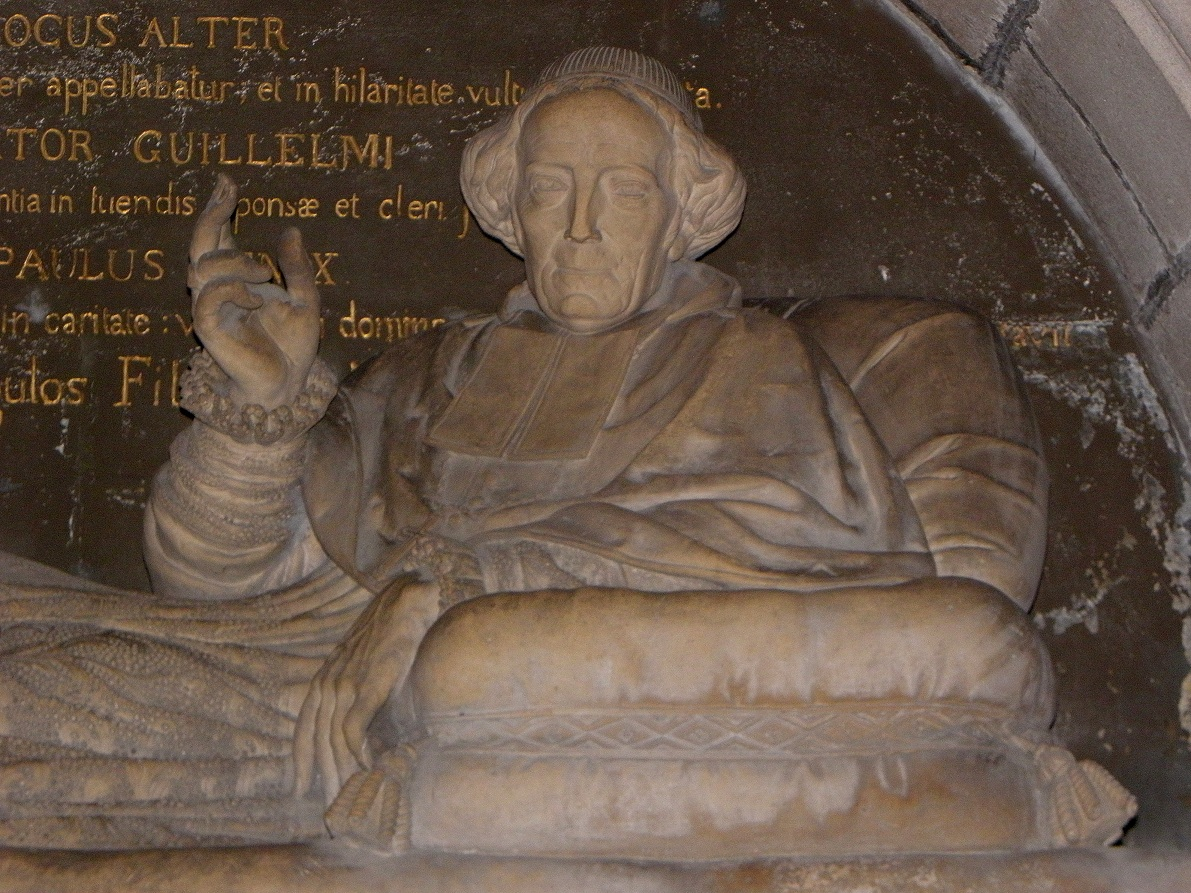
Detail of the tomb of Monseigneur Mathias Le Groing de La Romagère, bishop of Saint-Brieuc and Treguier from 1817 to 1841

== The cathedral's altar ==
The cathedral's high altar is made from marble and was made in 1831 at Rennes by Pince based on designs by the architect Richelot. The altar in the transept was created by the Rennes sculptor Hérault in 1854 and is decorated with statues by the sculptor Ogé senior. The cathedral's cathedra or "trône épiscopal" is the work of the Etienne brothers from Trévé.

== The organ and organ casing ==
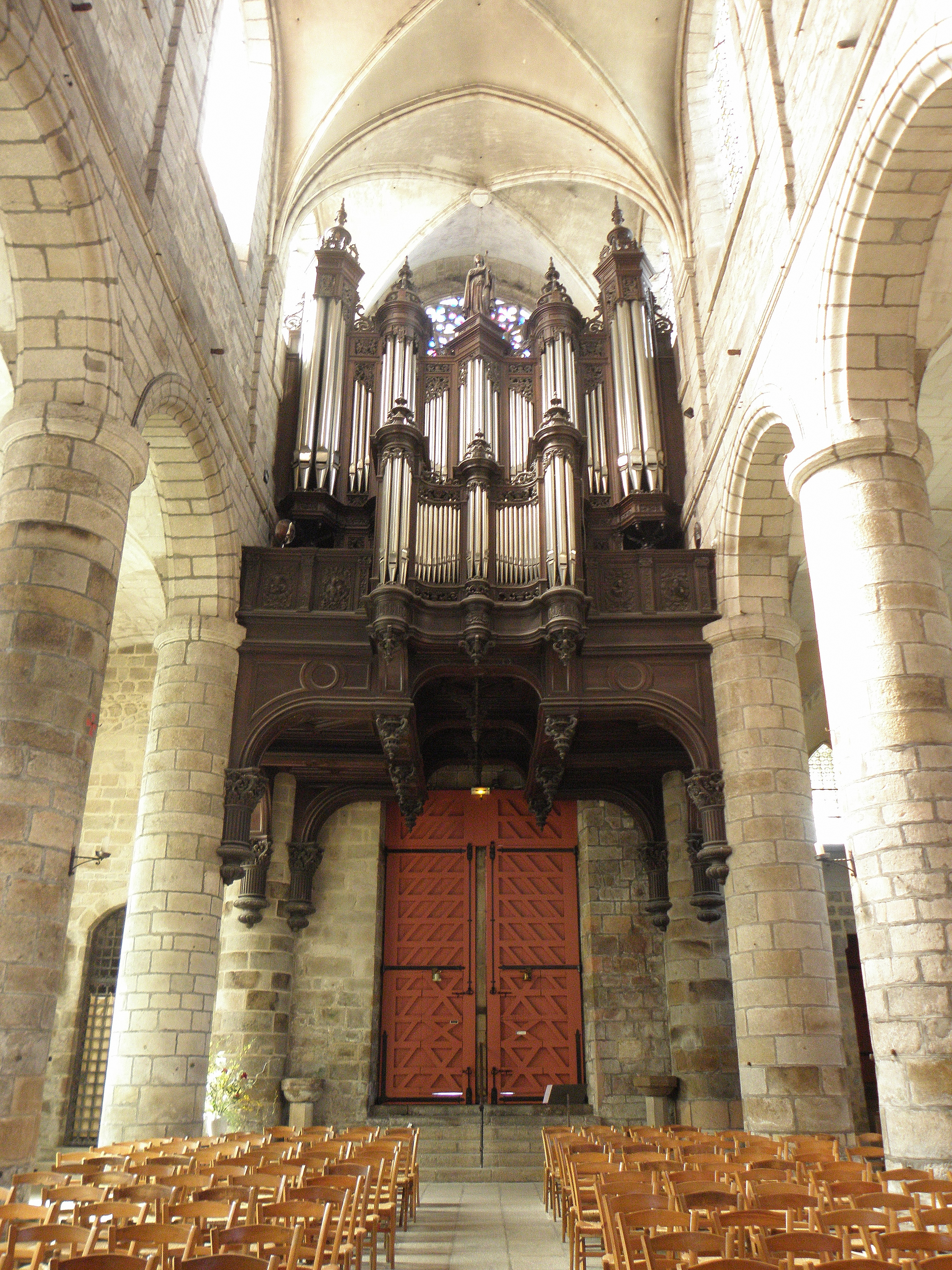
The Cavaillé-Coll organ

The Cavaillé-Coll organ was built in 1848 replacing a much smaller instrument. Aristide Cavaillé-Coll was a prominent French organ maker. The instrument was classified as a "Monument historique" in 1975. From 1986 to 1988 the organ was restored by Jean Renault. The organ casing or buffet in French was made in the 19th century by the Étienne brothers. They included in the work some panels which came originally from England in 1540. The casing was classified as a "Monument historique" in 1906 when the cathedral itself was similarly classified. The organ is also decorated with a statue of sainte Cecilia by Jean-Marie Valentin.

== The cathedral's Treasury ==
By the entrance to the ambulatory a grilled door leads to the Chapelle des reliques called La Petite Trésorerie. The principal relics kept here are those of saint-Brieuc and saint-Guillaume and a thorn from the crown of thorns called "Saint-Bro".

== The stations of the cross ==
The work of Georges Saupique and executed in 1958. They are carved in granite and the sculptor has added two further stations, depicting the Annunciation and the Resurrection.

== Miscellaneous images ==
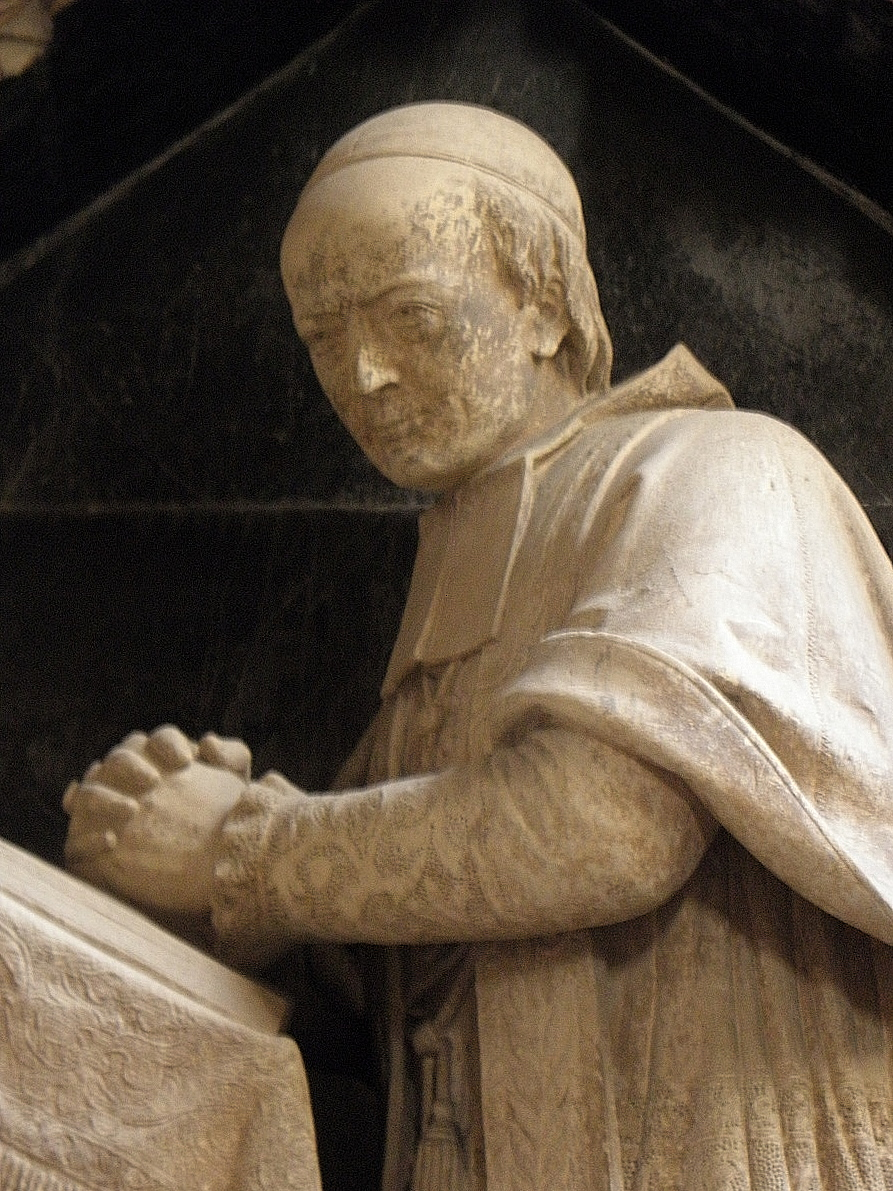
The tomb of Monseigneur Jacques Jean-Pierre Le Mée,

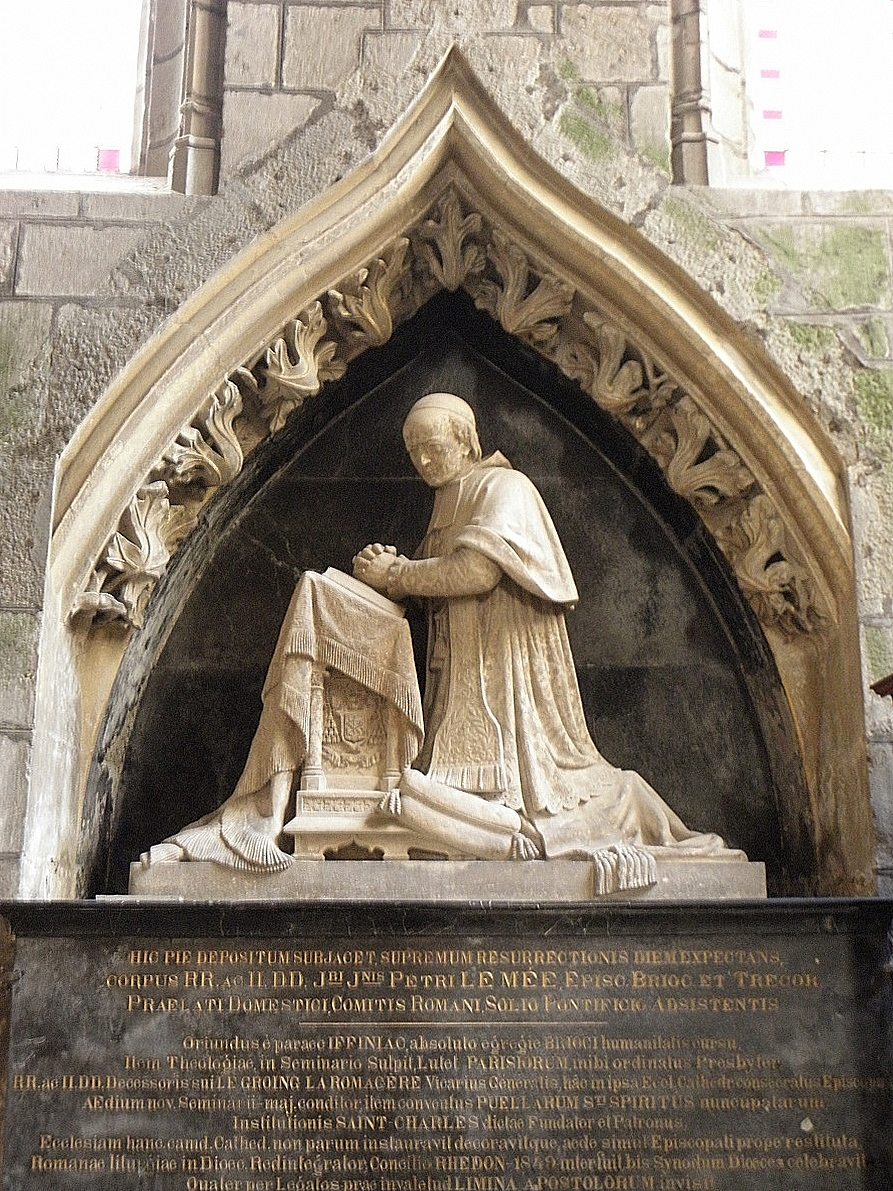
Another view of the tomb of Monseigneur Jacques Jean-Pierre Le Mée,

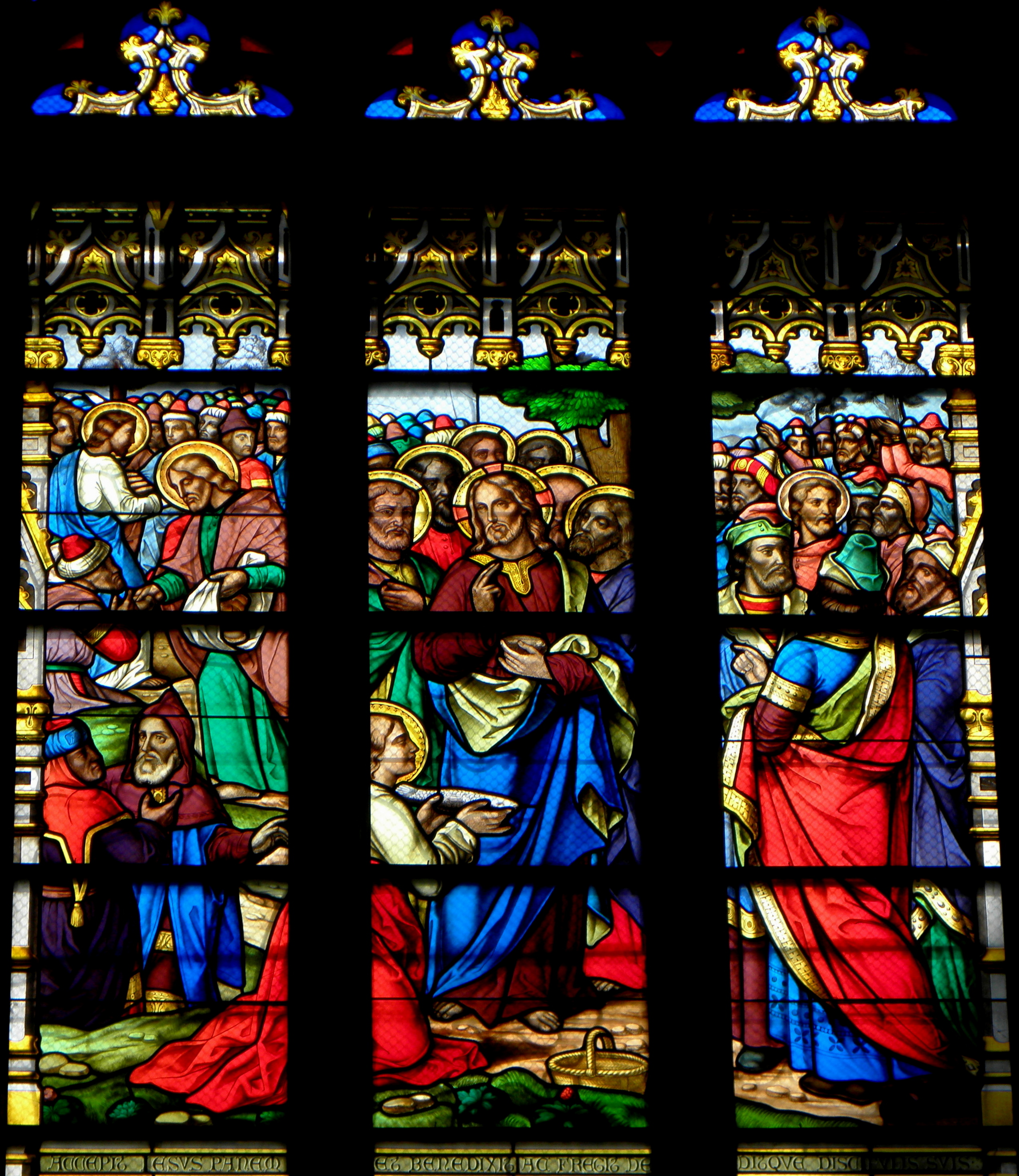
One of the lancets of the transept window. Jesus feeds the 5000

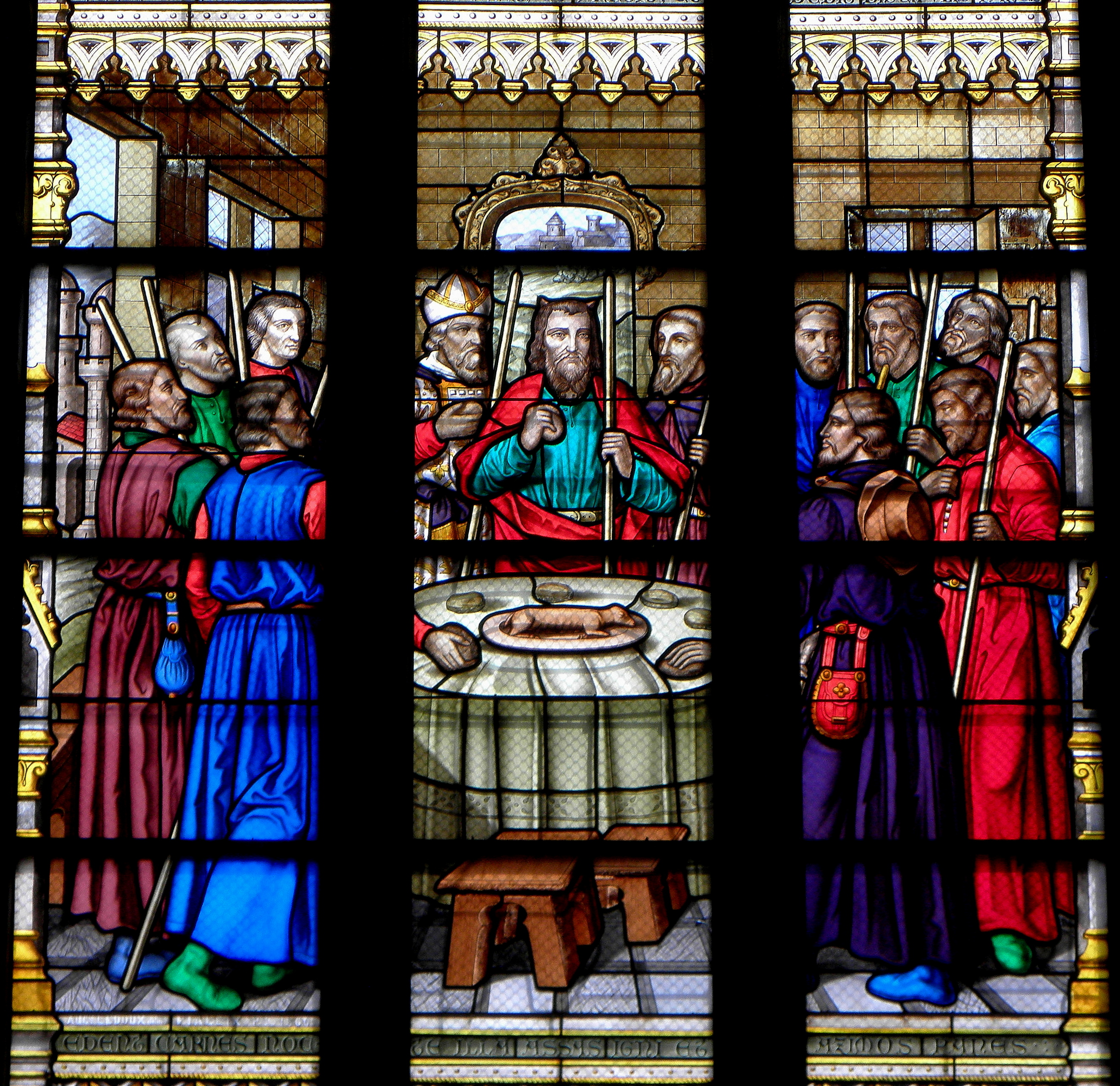
The Passover. Another panel of the transept window.

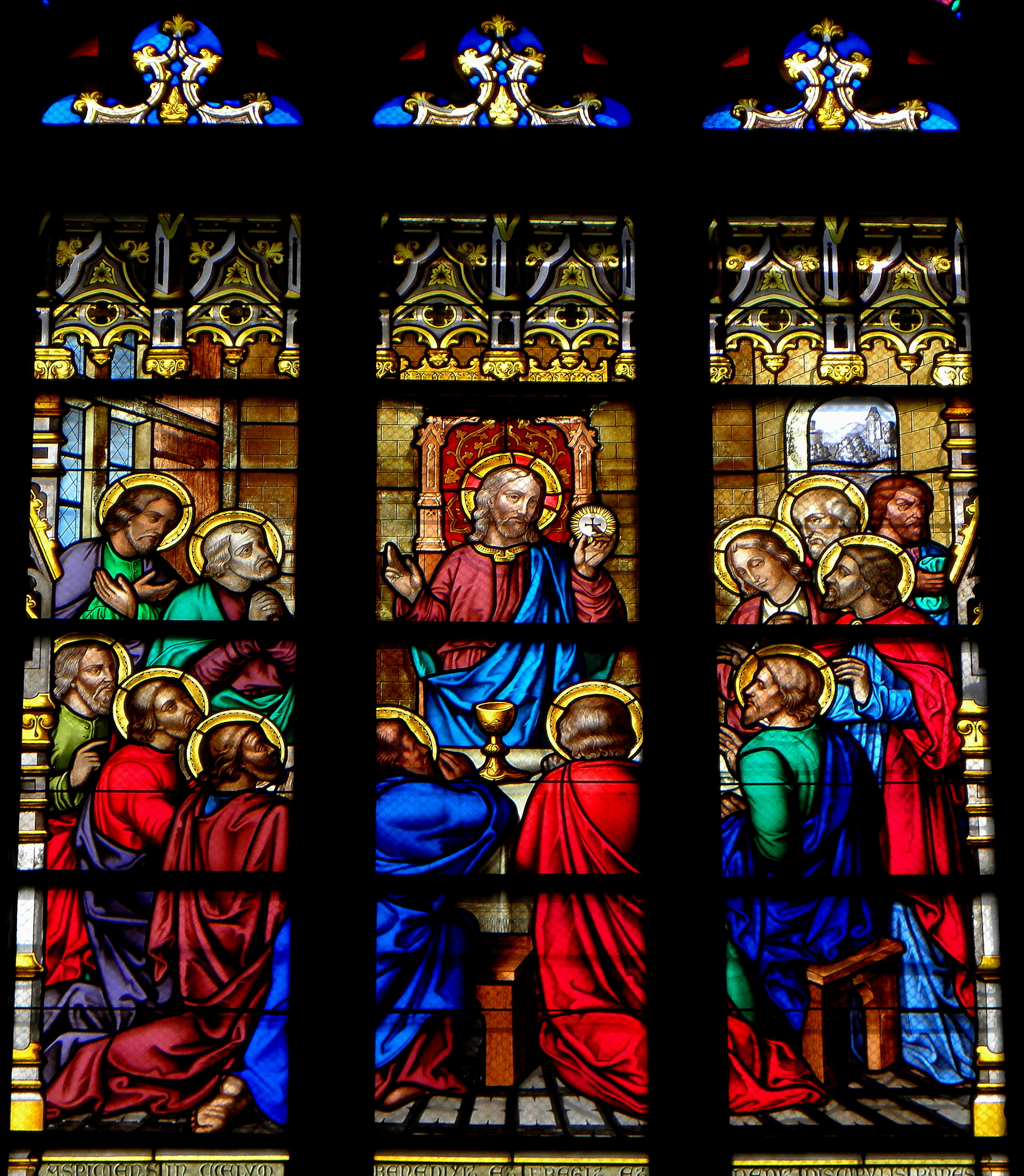
The Last Supper. Another panel of the transept window.

== Le Saint Chiot ==
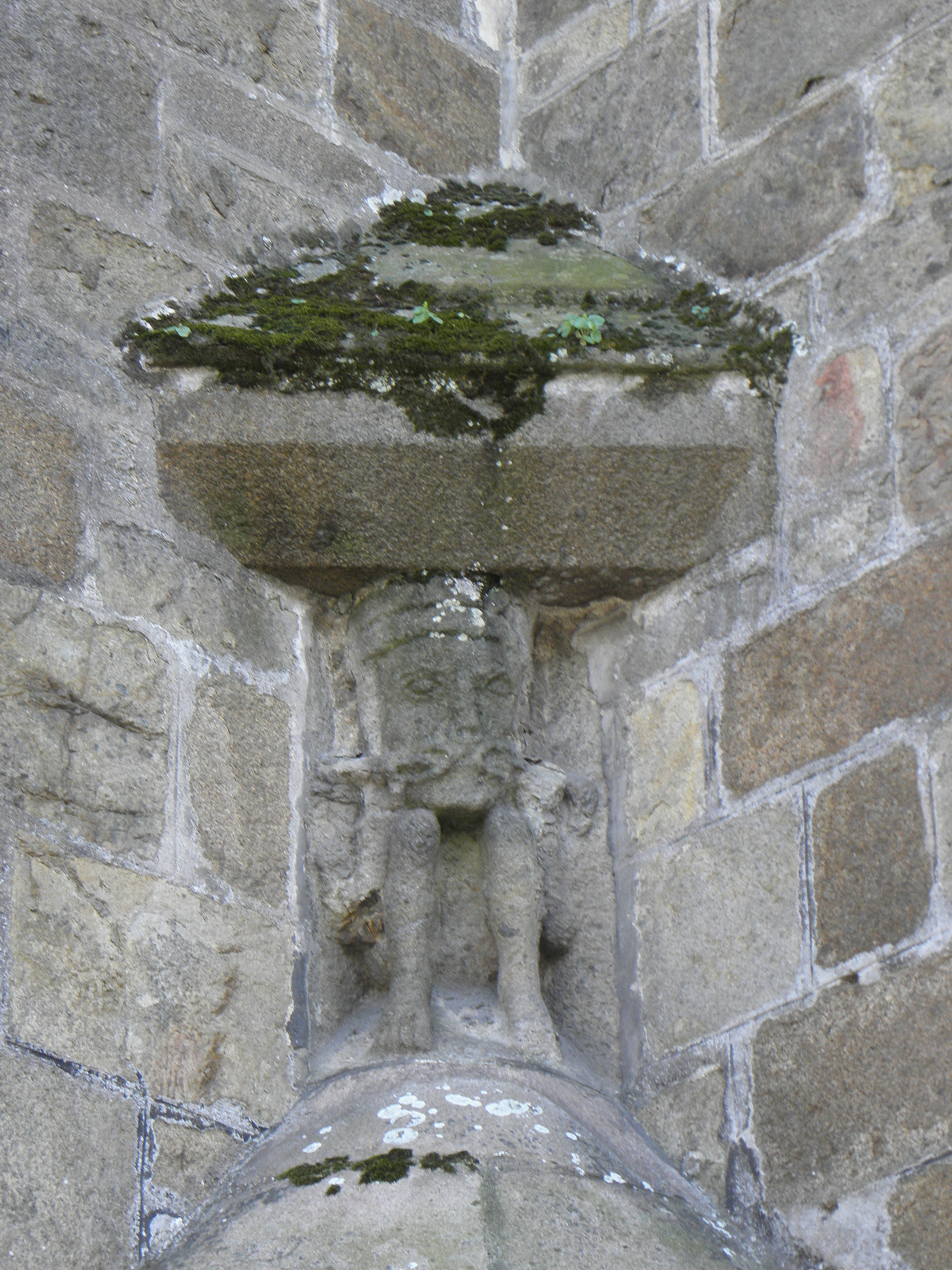
Le "Saint Chiot". This carving shows the mythical Saint Chiot sitting on a latrine

== Tro Breizh ==
Tro Breizh (Breton for "Tour of Brittany") is a Catholic pilgrimage that links the towns of the seven founding saints of Brittany. These seven saints were Celtic monks from Britain from around the 5th or 6th century who brought Christianity to Armorica and founded its first bishoprics.

The tour originally was a month-long 600 km (370 mi) walking tour, but when relaunched in 1994 by Les Chemins du Tro Breizh ("The Paths of the Tro Breizh" in French), it was decided to limit the tour to one week-long stage every year, still following the original path:

The seven towns are:-

- Quimper, Saint Corentin's town
- Saint-Pol-de-Léon, Saint Pol's town
- Tréguier, Saint Tudwal's town
- Saint-Brieuc named after its founder Brioc
- Saint Malo, similarly named for Malo
- Dol, Samson of Dol's town
- Vannes, Saint Patern's town

An old Breton legend says that those who do not complete the Tro Breizh in their lifetime will be sentenced to complete it in their afterlife, walking the length of the tour from within their coffin every seven years.

== Other Tro Breizh cathedrals or basilicas ==
- Saint-Pol-de-Léon's Cathedral of Saint Paul Aurélien, the Notre-Dame du Kreisker Chapel and the Chapelle Saint-Pierre and cemetery
- Tréguier Cathedral
- Quimper Cathedral
- Dol Cathedral
- Saint-Malo Cathedral
- Eglise Saint-Patern de Vannes
