= Plouagat =

Commune in Côtes-d'Armor, France

Plouagat Plagad
- Part of Châtelaudren-Plouagat
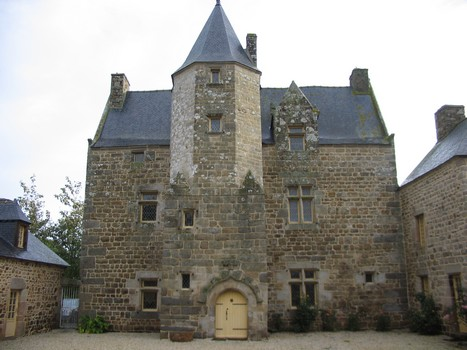
- Manor house of Fournebello

- Coat of arms
- Location of Plouagat
- Location within France Location within Brittany
- Coordinates: 48°32′15″N 2°59′51″W
- Country: France
- Region: Brittany
- Department: Côtes-d'Armor
- Arrondissement: Guingamp
- Canton: Plélo
- Commune: Châtelaudren-Plouagat
- Area^{1}: 31.98 km^{2} (12.35 sq mi)
- Highest elevation: 262 m (860 ft)
- Lowest elevation: 68 m (223 ft)
- Population (2022): 2,989
  - Density: 93.46/km^{2} (242.1/sq mi)
- Time zone: UTC+01:00 (CET)
  - Summer (DST): UTC+02:00 (CEST)
- Postal code: 22170
- ^{1} French Land Register data, which excludes lakes, ponds, glaciers > 1 km^{2} (0.386 sq mi or 247 acres) and river estuaries.

Plouagat (French pronunciation: [pluaɡat]; Breton: Plagad; Gallo: Plagat) is a former commune in the Côtes-d'Armor department of Brittany in northwestern France. On 1 January 2019, it was merged into the new commune Châtelaudren-Plouagat.

== Population ==
Inhabitants of Plouagat are called plouagatins in French.

Historical population
Year	Pop.	±% p.a.
1962	1,522	—
1968	1,472	−0.56%
1975	1,727	+2.31%
1982	1,978	+1.96%
1990	2,154	+1.07%
1999	2,221	+0.34%
2006	2,275	+0.34%
2022	2,989	+1.72%
Source: EHESS and INSEE

== See also ==
- Communes of the Côtes-d'Armor department
