= Châtelaudren-Plouagat =

- Commune
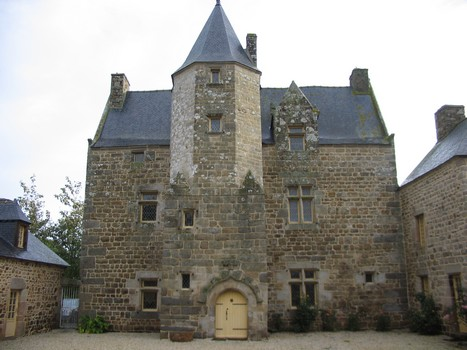
- Manor house of Fournebello
- Location of Châtelaudren-Plouagat
- Location within France Location within Brittany
- Coordinates: 48°32′15″N 2°59′51″W
- Country: France
- Region: Brittany
- Department: Côtes-d'Armor
- Arrondissement: Guingamp
- Canton: Plélo
- Intercommunality: Leff Armor

Government
  - Mayor (2020–2026): Olivier Boissière
- Area^{1}: 32.44 km^{2} (12.53 sq mi)
- Highest elevation: 262 m (860 ft)
- Lowest elevation: 68 m (223 ft)
- Population (2023): 3,974
  - Density: 122.5/km^{2} (317.3/sq mi)
- Time zone: UTC+01:00 (CET)
  - Summer (DST): UTC+02:00 (CEST)
- INSEE/Postal code: 22206 /22170
- ^{1} French Land Register data, which excludes lakes, ponds, glaciers > 1 km^{2} (0.386 sq mi or 247 acres) and river estuaries.

Châtelaudren-Plouagat (French pronunciation: [ʃatɛlodʁɛ̃ pluaɡat]; Breton: Kastellaodren-Plagad) is a commune in the Côtes-d'Armor department of Brittany in northwestern France. It was established on 1 January 2019 by merger of the former communes of Plouagat (the seat) and Châtelaudren.

The commune is listed as a Village étape.

== Population ==
Population data refer to the commune in its geography as of January 2025.

Historical population
Year	Pop.	±% p.a.
1968	2,600	—
1975	2,715	+0.62%
1982	2,951	+1.20%
1990	3,101	+0.62%
1999	3,142	+0.15%
2007	3,382	+0.92%
2012	3,650	+1.54%
2017	3,868	+1.17%
2023	3,974	+0.45%
Source: INSEE

== See also ==
- Communes of the Côtes-d'Armor department
