= Châtelaudren =

Commune in Côtes-d'Armor, France

Châtelaudren Le Chastèu (Gallo) Kastellaodren (Breton)
- Part of Châtelaudren-Plouagat
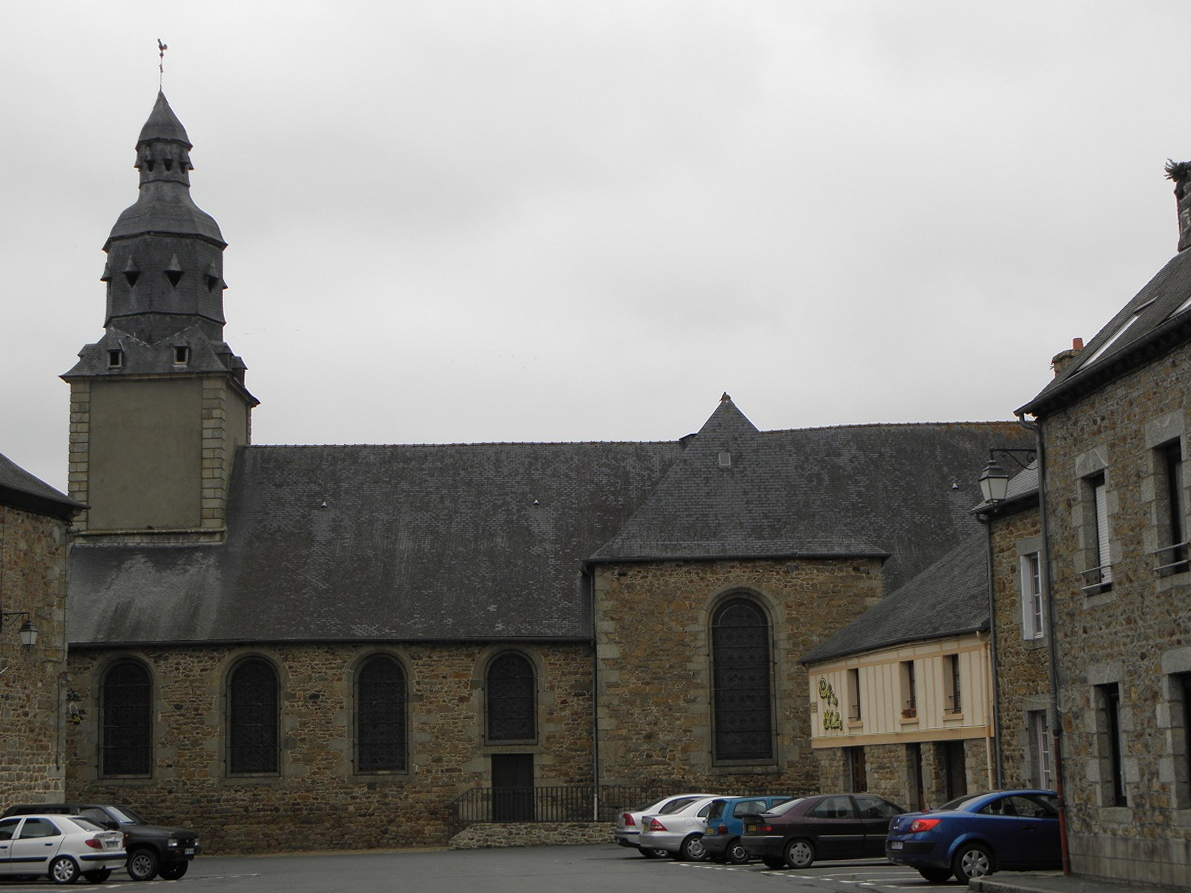
- The church of Châtelaudren

- Coat of arms
- Location of Châtelaudren
- Location within France Location within Brittany
- Coordinates: 48°32′34″N 2°58′11″W
- Country: France
- Region: Brittany
- Department: Côtes-d'Armor
- Arrondissement: Guingamp
- Canton: Plélo
- Commune: Châtelaudren-Plouagat
- Area^{1}: 0.46 km^{2} (0.18 sq mi)
- Highest elevation: 133 m (436 ft)
- Lowest elevation: 9 m (30 ft)
- Population (2023): 984
  - Density: 2,100/km^{2} (5,500/sq mi)
- Time zone: UTC+01:00 (CET)
  - Summer (DST): UTC+02:00 (CEST)
- Postal code: 22170
- ^{1} French Land Register data, which excludes lakes, ponds, glaciers > 1 km^{2} (0.386 sq mi or 247 acres) and river estuaries.

Châtelaudren (French pronunciation: [ʃatɛlodʁɛ̃]; Breton: Kastellaodren; Gallo: Le Chastèu) is a former commune in the Côtes-d'Armor department of Brittany in northwestern France. On 1 January 2019, it was merged into the new commune Châtelaudren-Plouagat. Inhabitants of Châtelaudren are called Châtelaudrinais in French.

== See also ==
- Communes of the Côtes-d'Armor department
