= A84 autoroute =

Road in France

A84 autoroute
- Autoroute des Estuaires
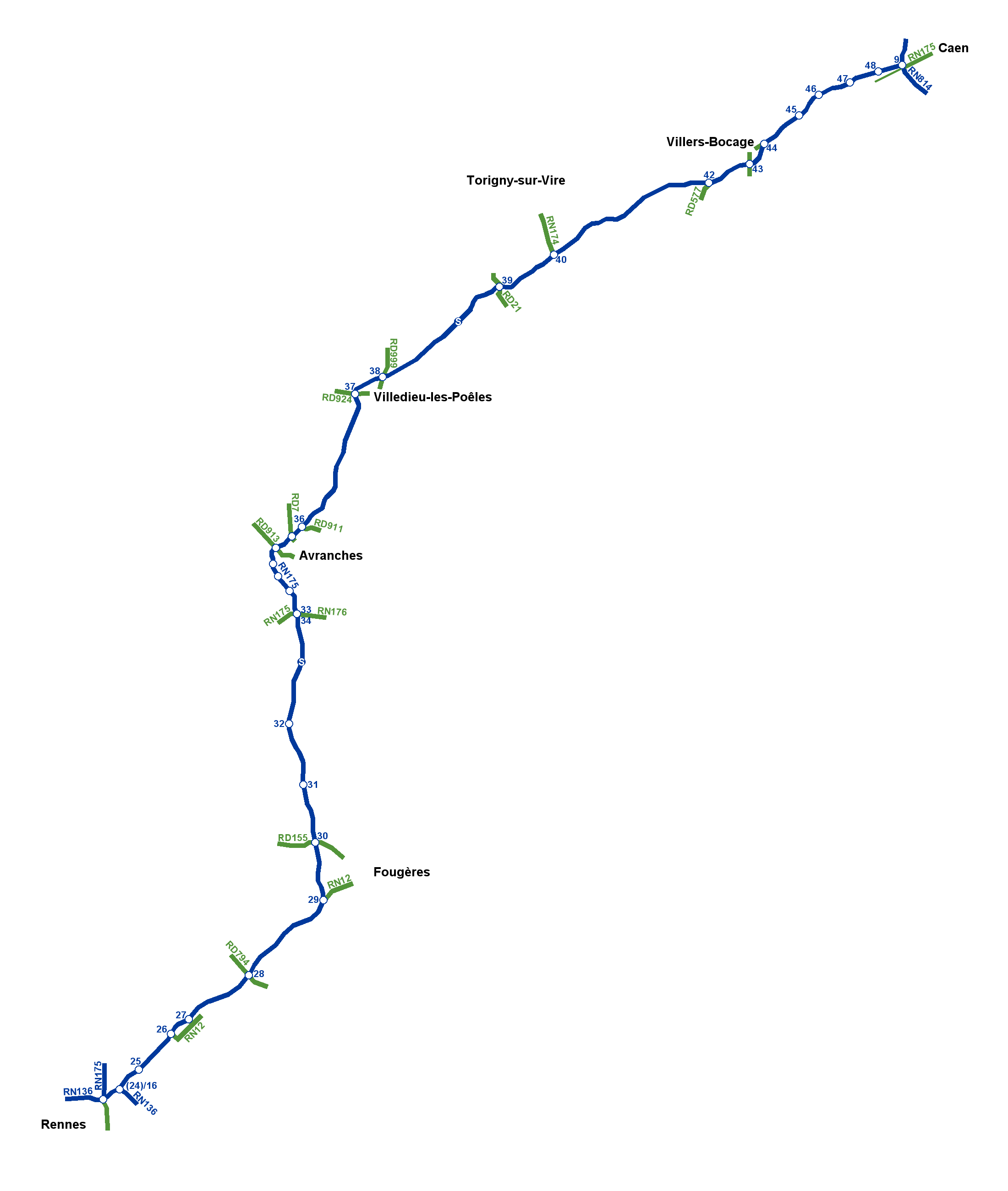

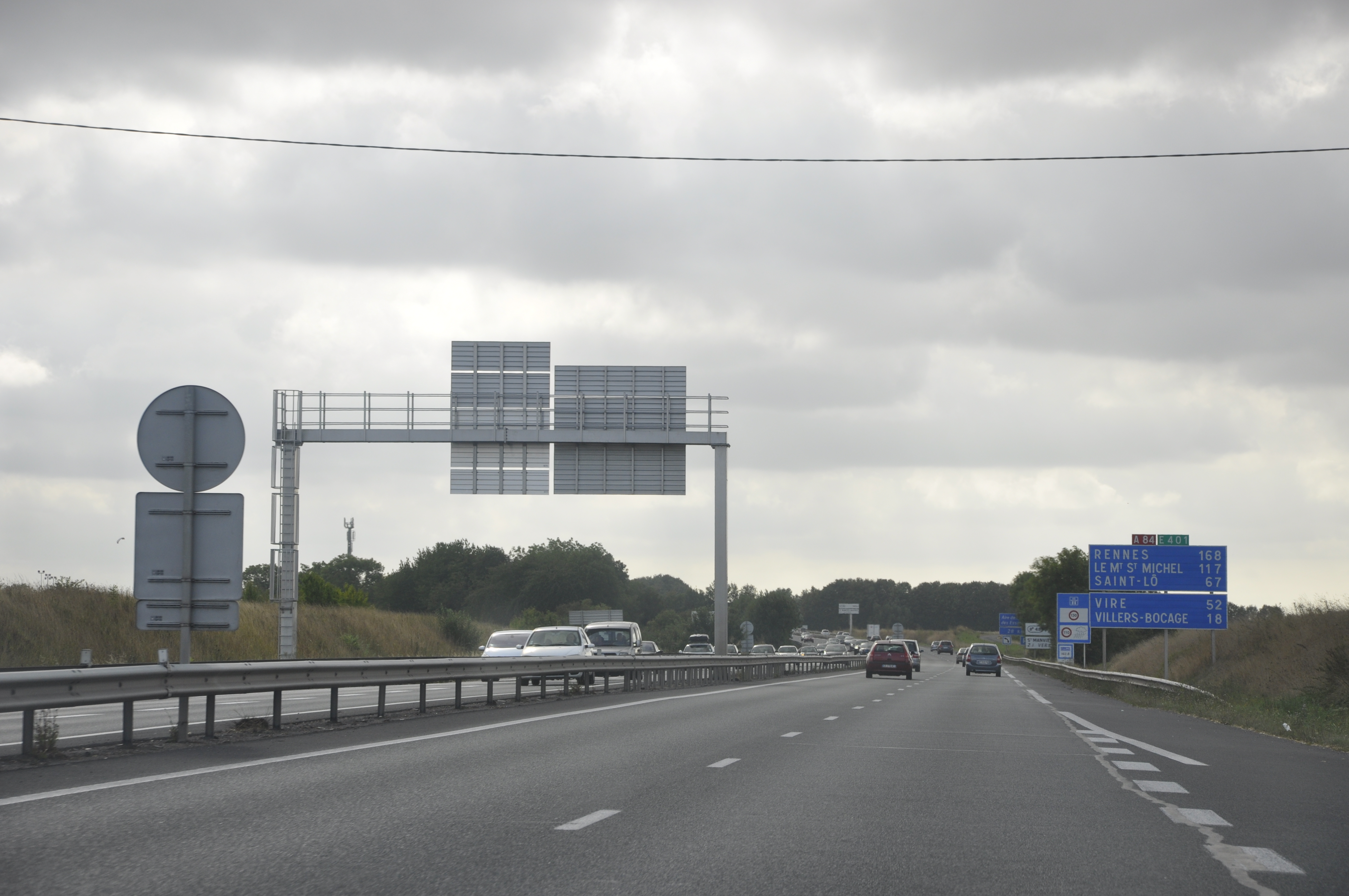
- Start of A84 at the Porte de Bretagne exit of the Périphérique Caen.

Route information
- Part of E3 E401
- Length: 170 km (110 mi)
- Existed: 2003–present

Major junctions
- South-West end: E3 / N 136 (Rocade de Rennes) in Rennes

- E401 / N 175 in Poilley and Ponts

- South end: E401 / N 814 (Périphérique Caen) in Caen

Location
- Country: France
- Major cities: Caen and Rennes

Highway system
- Roads in France; Autoroutes; Routes nationales

The A84 autoroute is a major motorway in western France completed on 27 January 2003 to connect the cities of Rennes in Brittany with Caen in Lower Normandy. It is part of the Autoroute des Estuaires from Belgium to Spain, avoiding Paris.

== Characteristics ==
The motorway, 170 km long, cost a total of € 650 million. It is dual-carriageway both ways on its entire course and service areas are positioned at regular intervals. It is toll free.

The motorway was built with a special road surface to allow rain water to run off quickly, but it is ineffective with snow that often falls in large quantities in winter, so snowploughs are employed regularly. Motorway traffic radio 107.7 broadcasts A84 information specifically.

- 2 × 2 carriageway
- 170 km in length
- Total cost : €650 000 000 (2003)
- 3 speed camera zones
- 5 service areas (Aires de service et repos):
  - l'aire du mont Saint-Michel (Total), Saint-Aubin-de-Terregatte
  - l'aire de la Baie, Braffais
  - l'aire de la vallée de la Vire (Shell), Gouvets
  - l'aire de Cahagnes, Cahagnes
  - l'aire de Saint-Jean des Essartiers, Saint-Jean-des-Essartiers

The highway is free throughout its entire length. The various governments have studied the concession of this highway, but the regional authorities of Brittany and Normandy have convinced the public authorities to build and manage this highway with public funds.

== History ==
- 1979: Ministerial decision to upgrade the road between Caen and Avranches to dual carriageway.
- 1987: Decision by the CIAT to connect Caen, Rennes and Nantes by motorway ensuring the continuity of the French motorway network.
- 1994: The connections between Caen and Avranches and Avranches and Rennes are declared of public utility.
- 27 January 2003: Opening of the last section of the A84 except the Rennes and Avranches bypasses.

== Route ==
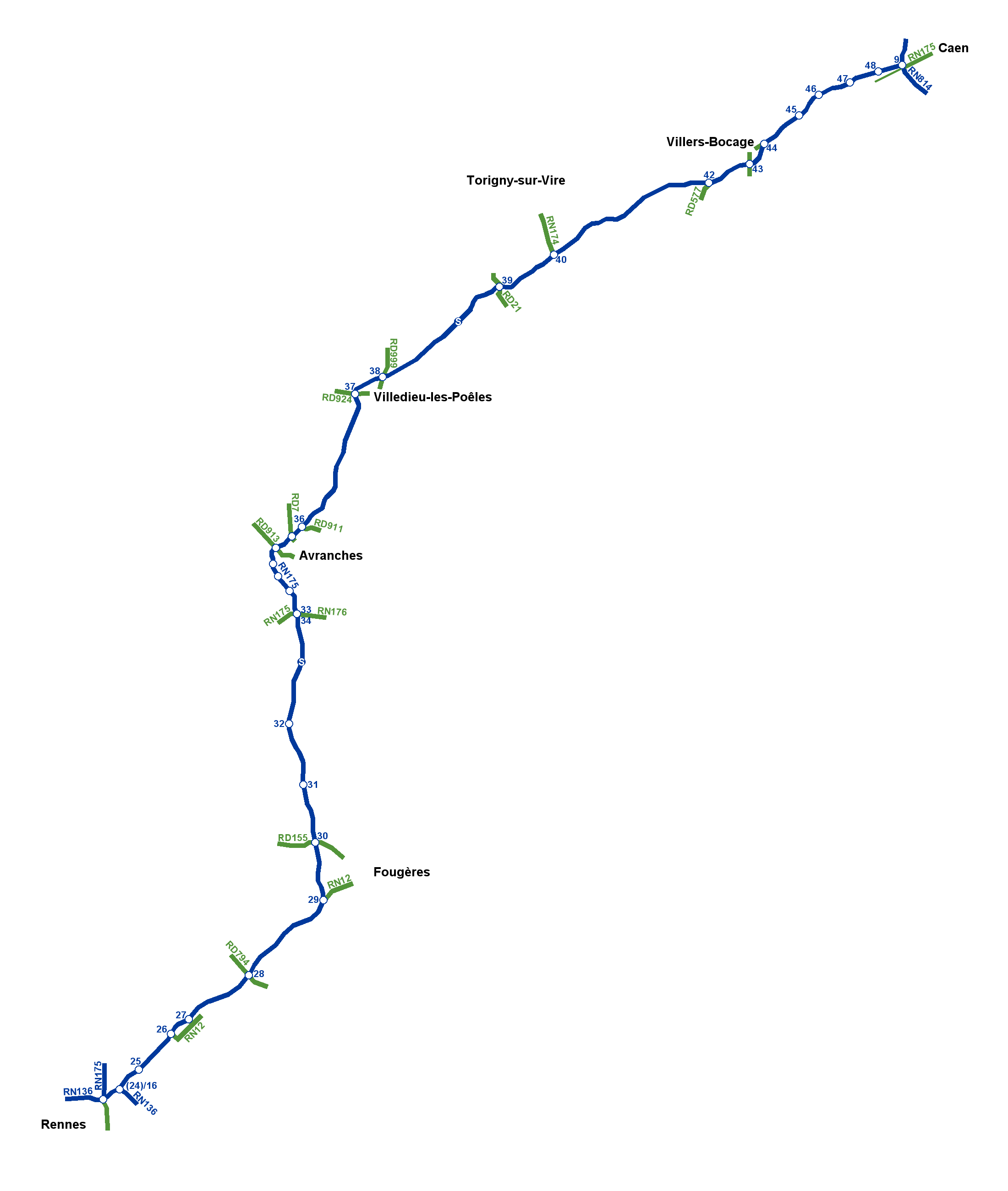
Map of the A84.

== List of junctions ==
Region	Department	Junction	Destinations	Notes
Bretagne	Ille-et-Vilaine			
Bretagne	Ille-et-Vilaine	Rocade de Rennes - A84	Rocade Nord : Rennes - centre, Brest, Lorient, Saint-Malo	
Bretagne	Ille-et-Vilaine	Rocade de Rennes - A84	Rocade Est : Le Mans, Nantes, Thorigné-Fouillard	
Bretagne	Ille-et-Vilaine	25 : Thorigné-Fouillard	Thorigné-Fouillard	Exit and entry from Caen
Bretagne	Ille-et-Vilaine	26 : Liffré - sud	La Bouëxière, Saint-Sulpice-la-Forêt, Liffré - centre	Exit from Caen
Bretagne	Ille-et-Vilaine	27 : Liffré - nord	Ercé-près-Liffré, Gosné, Liffré - centre, Beaugé	Entry and exit from Caen
Bretagne	Ille-et-Vilaine	28 : Saint-Aubin-du-Cormier	Combourg, Vitré, Gosné, Saint-Aubin-du-Cormier	
Bretagne	Ille-et-Vilaine	Aire de La Chaîne (Northbound); Aire de La Lande (Southbound)		
Bretagne	Ille-et-Vilaine	29 : Romagné	Alençon, Fougères, Vitré, Saint-Sauveur-des-Landes, Romagné	
Bretagne	Ille-et-Vilaine	30 : Saint-Étienne-en-Coglès	Antrain, Saint-Brice-en-Coglès, Saint-Germain-en-Coglès, Saint-Étienne-en-Coglès, Le Mont-Saint-Michel	
Bretagne	Ille-et-Vilaine	Aires du Coglais		
Bretagne	Ille-et-Vilaine	31 : Coglès	Louvigné-du-Désert, Antrain, Montours, Coglès	
Normandie	Manche	32 : Saint-James	Pontorson, Saint-James	
Normandie	Manche	Aire du Mont-Saint-Michel		
Normandie	Manche	33 : Durcey	Alençon, Le Mont-Saint-Michel, Saint-Hilaire-du-Harcouët, Ducey	
Normandie	Manche	34 : Poiley	Saint-Brieuc, Saint-Malo, Le Mont-Saint-Michel, Pontorson	Entry and exit from Caen
Normandie	Manche	E3 / A 84 becomes E3 / E401 / N 175		
Normandie	Manche	Cromel (RD 103 - RD 43^{E2})	Avranches - centre, Saint-Quentin-sur-le-Homme, Le Val-Saint-Père, Z. A. du Cromel, Centre Commercial	
Normandie	Manche	La Croix Verte (RD 456)	Avranches - Jardin des Plantes, Le Val-Saint-Père, Le Gué de l'Épine, Aérodrome d'Avranches - Le Val-Saint-Père	
Normandie	Manche	La Porionnais Moncreton (RD 973)	Granville, Jullouville, Avranches - centre, Avranches - Gare SNCF	
Normandie	Manche	Avranches - Hôpital (RD 31)	Avranches, Centre Hospitalier	
Normandie	Manche	Aubigny Maudon (RD 7)	Coutances, La Haye-Pesnel, Avranches, Ponts, Centre Hospitalier	
Normandie	Manche	E3 / E401 / N 175 becomes again E3 / E401 / A 84		
Normandie	Manche	36 : Ponts	Brécey, Villedieu-les-Poêles, Le Parc, Ponts	
Normandie	Manche	Aires de la Baie		
Normandie	Manche	37 : Villedieu-les-Poêles - est	Coutances, Granville, Gavray, Villedieu-les-Poêles	
Normandie	Manche	38 : Villedieu-les-Poêles - nord	Vire, Brécey, Percy, Villedieu-les-Poêles, Avranches	
Normandie	Manche	Aire de la Vallée de la Vire Gouvets		
Normandie	Manche	39 : Pont-Farcy	Tessy-sur-Vire, Pont-Farcy	
Normandie	Manche	Aire de la Villeneuve-en-Chevrie		
Normandie	Manche	40 : Torigni-sur-Vire	Cherbourg-en-Cotentin, Saint-Lô, Coutances, Torigni-sur-Vire	
Normandie	Manche	E3 / E401 / A 84 becomes E3 / E401 / A 84		
Normandie	Calvados	41 : Saint-Martin-des-Besaces	Caumont-l'Éventé, Saint-Martin-des-Besaces	
Normandie	Calvados	Aire de Cahagnes (Northbound); Aire de Saint-Jean des Essartiers (Southbound)		
Normandie	Calvados	42 : Jurques	Vire, Caumont-l'Éventé, Jurques	
Normandie	Calvados	43 : Villers-Bocage - sud	Aunay-sur-Odon, Villers-Bocage, Bayeux	
Normandie	Calvados	44 : Villers-Bocage - nord	Bayeux, Villers-Bocage	Entry and exit from Caen
Normandie	Calvados	45 : Monts-en-Bessin	Évrecy, Parfouru-sur-Odon, Tournay-sur-Odon, Monts-en-Bessin	
Normandie	Calvados	46: Noyers-Bocage	Cheux, Missy, Noyers-Bocage	
Normandie	Calvados	47 : Grainville-sur-Odon	Évrecy, Cheux, Mondrainville, Grainville-sur-Odon	Entry and exit from Caen
Normandie	Calvados	48 : Verson	Saint-Manvieu-Norrey, Verson, Z. I. Verson	
Normandie	Calvados	Périphérique de Caen (RN 814) - A84	Périphérique Nord : Cherbourg-en-Cotentin, Carpiquet, Ouistreham, C.H.U	
Normandie	Calvados	Périphérique de Caen (RN 814) - A84	Périphérique Sud : Paris, Alençon, Flers, Caen - centre	
1.000 mi = 1.609 km; 1.000 km = 0.621 mi

== Village étape ==
The Autoroute is served by the following four Village étapes, Ducey, Maen Roch, Torigny-les-Villes and Villers-Bocage.

== Future extensions ==
The A84 is interrupted at Avranches. The bypass to the west of Avranches, by the RN 175 with two double lanes, has geometrical characteristics which do not allow the construction of motorway characteristics and status. An East motorway bypass for the A84 was therefore planned in the long term. The State bought 60 hectares of land and destroyed four houses along the route. However, the works are yet be launched. The land is still owned by the state.

The A84 is also to be extended to Nantes by upgrading the RN 137 dual-carriageway, thus creating a Caen-Rennes-Nantes route. This was abandoned, along with other projects of dual-carriageway upgrades in Brittany (RN 157 and RN 12 were planned to become A81 and RN 165 was planned to become A82).

In addition at Rennes, the construction of a "south-east bypass" will make it possible to avoid the Rennes ring-road on this route. Construction was due to commence from 2021 but was abandoned.
