= European route E401 =

Road in trans-European E-road network

E401

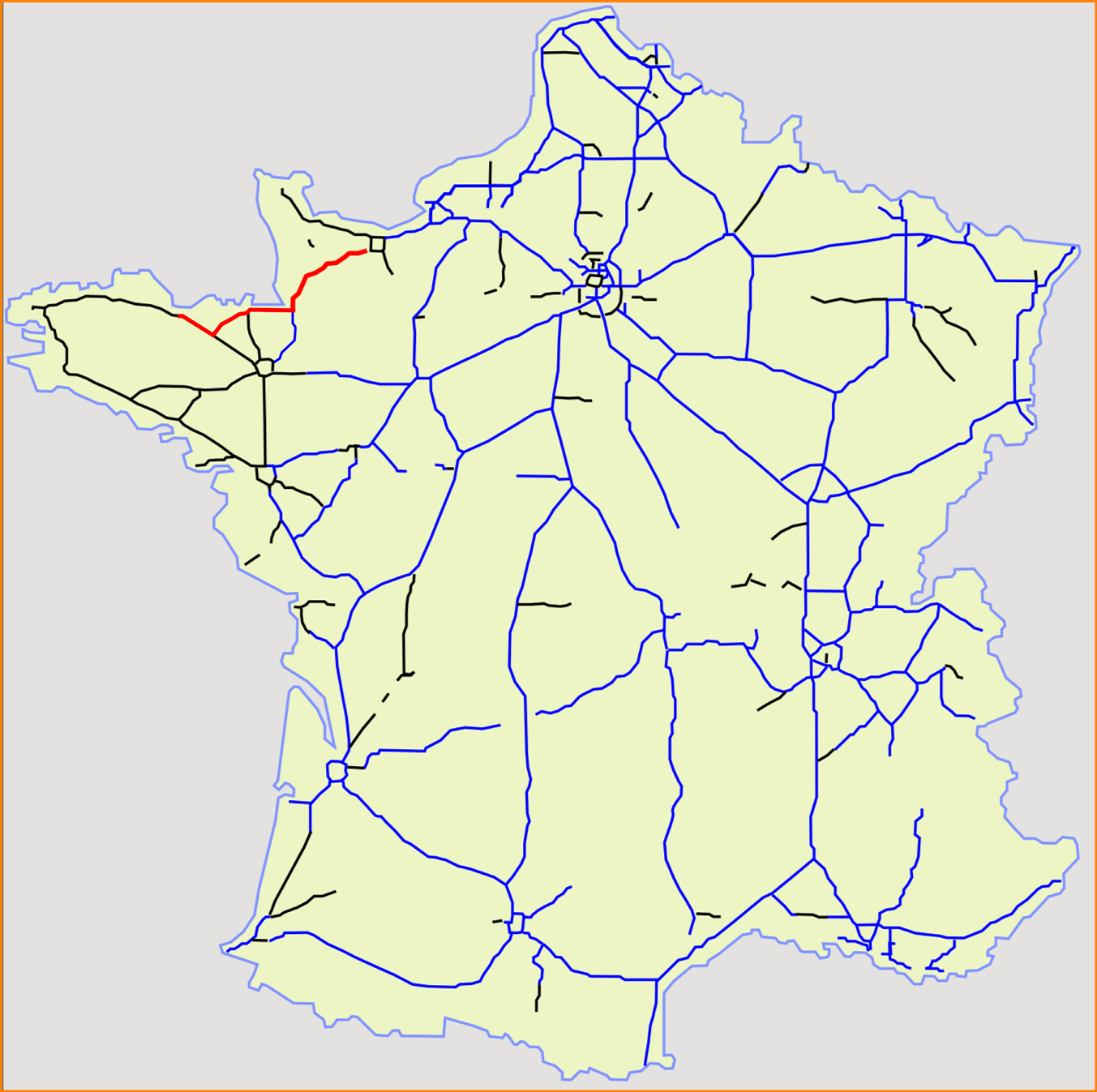
- E-roads in France with E401 in red

Route information
- Length: 231 km (144 mi)

Major junctions
- West end: Saint-Brieuc (France)
- E50 Saint-Brieuc E50 Tramain; E3 Pontaubault; E3 Villedieu-les-Poêles E46 Caen
- East end: Caen (France)

Location
- Countries: France

Highway system
- International E-road network; A Class; B Class

The European road E401 or E401 is a road that only runs through France.

The road starts near Saint-Brieuc and ends in Caen. Between Saint-Brieuc and Tramain are the E401 and the E50 on the same track. Between Pontaubault and Villedieu-les-Poêles are the E401 and the E3 on the same track.

== National roadnumbers ==
The E401 runs over on the following national roadnumbers:

| Number | Route |
France
| N 12 | Saint-Brieuc - Tramain |
| N 176 | Tramain - Pontorson |
| N 175 | Pontorson - Pontaubault |
| A 84 | Pontaubault - Caen |
| N 814 | Ring Caen |
