= Noyers-Bocage =

- Part of Val d'Arry
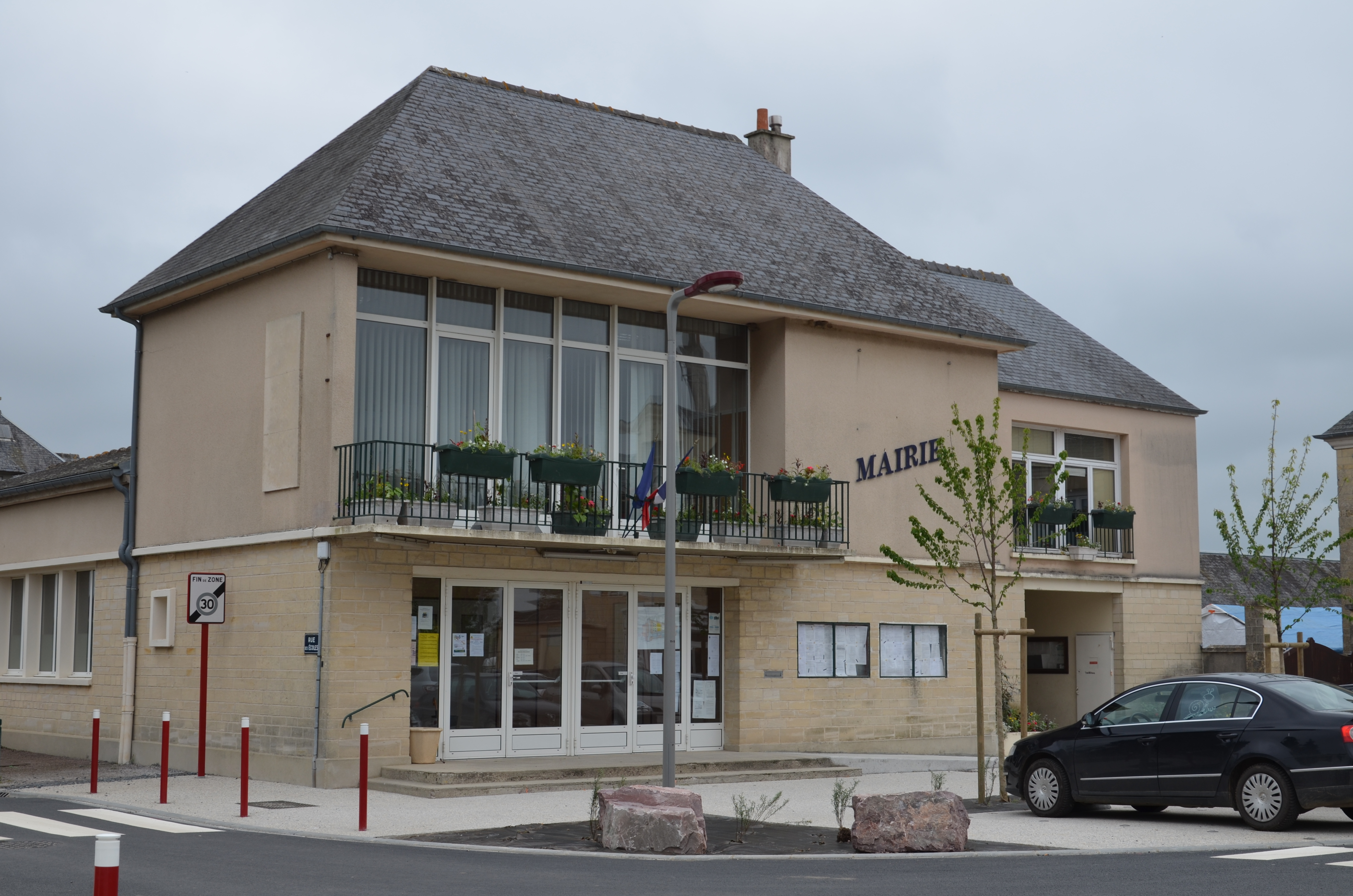
- Location of Noyers-Bocage
- Location within France Location within Normandy
- Coordinates: 49°07′21″N 0°34′01″W
- Country: France
- Region: Normandy
- Department: Calvados
- Arrondissement: Caen
- Canton: Les Monts d'Aunay
- Commune: Val d'Arry
- Area^{1}: 8.87 km^{2} (3.42 sq mi)
- Elevation: 130 m (430 ft)
- Highest elevation: 193 m (633 ft)
- Lowest elevation: 85 m (279 ft)
- Population (2022): 1,294
  - Density: 146/km^{2} (378/sq mi)
- Time zone: UTC+01:00 (CET)
  - Summer (DST): UTC+02:00 (CEST)
- Postal code: 14210
- ^{1} French Land Register data, which excludes lakes, ponds, glaciers > 1 km^{2} (0.386 sq mi or 247 acres) and river estuaries.

Noyers-Bocage (French pronunciation: [nwaje bɔkaʒ]) is a former commune in the Calvados department in the Normandy region in northwestern France. On 1 January 2016, it was merged into the new commune of Noyers-Missy, which became part of the new commune Val d'Arry on 1 January 2017.

== Population ==
Historical population
Year	Pop.	±% p.a.
1962	466	—
1968	525	+2.01%
1975	604	+2.02%
1982	620	+0.37%
1990	797	+3.19%
1999	822	+0.34%
2006	1,103	+4.29%
2022	1,294	+1.00%
Source: EHESS and INSEE

== See also ==
- Communes of the Calvados department
