= Noyers-Missy =

- Part of Val d'Arry
- Location of Noyers-Missy
- Location within France Location within Normandy
- Coordinates: 49°07′19″N 0°34′05″W
- Country: France
- Region: Normandy
- Department: Calvados
- Arrondissement: Caen
- Canton: Les Monts d'Aunay
- Commune: Val d'Arry
- Area^{1}: 13.93 km^{2} (5.38 sq mi)
- Population (2014): 1,643
  - Density: 117.9/km^{2} (305.5/sq mi)
- Time zone: UTC+01:00 (CET)
  - Summer (DST): UTC+02:00 (CEST)
- Postal code: 14210
- ^{1} French Land Register data, which excludes lakes, ponds, glaciers > 1 km^{2} (0.386 sq mi or 247 acres) and river estuaries.

Noyers-Missy (French pronunciation: [nwaje misi]) was a short-lived commune in the department of Calvados, northwestern France. The commune was established on 1 January 2016 by merger of the former communes of Noyers-Bocage and Missy. On 1 January 2017, it was merged into the new commune Val d'Arry.

== See also ==
- Communes of the Calvados department
