= Le Locheur =

- Part of Val d'Arry
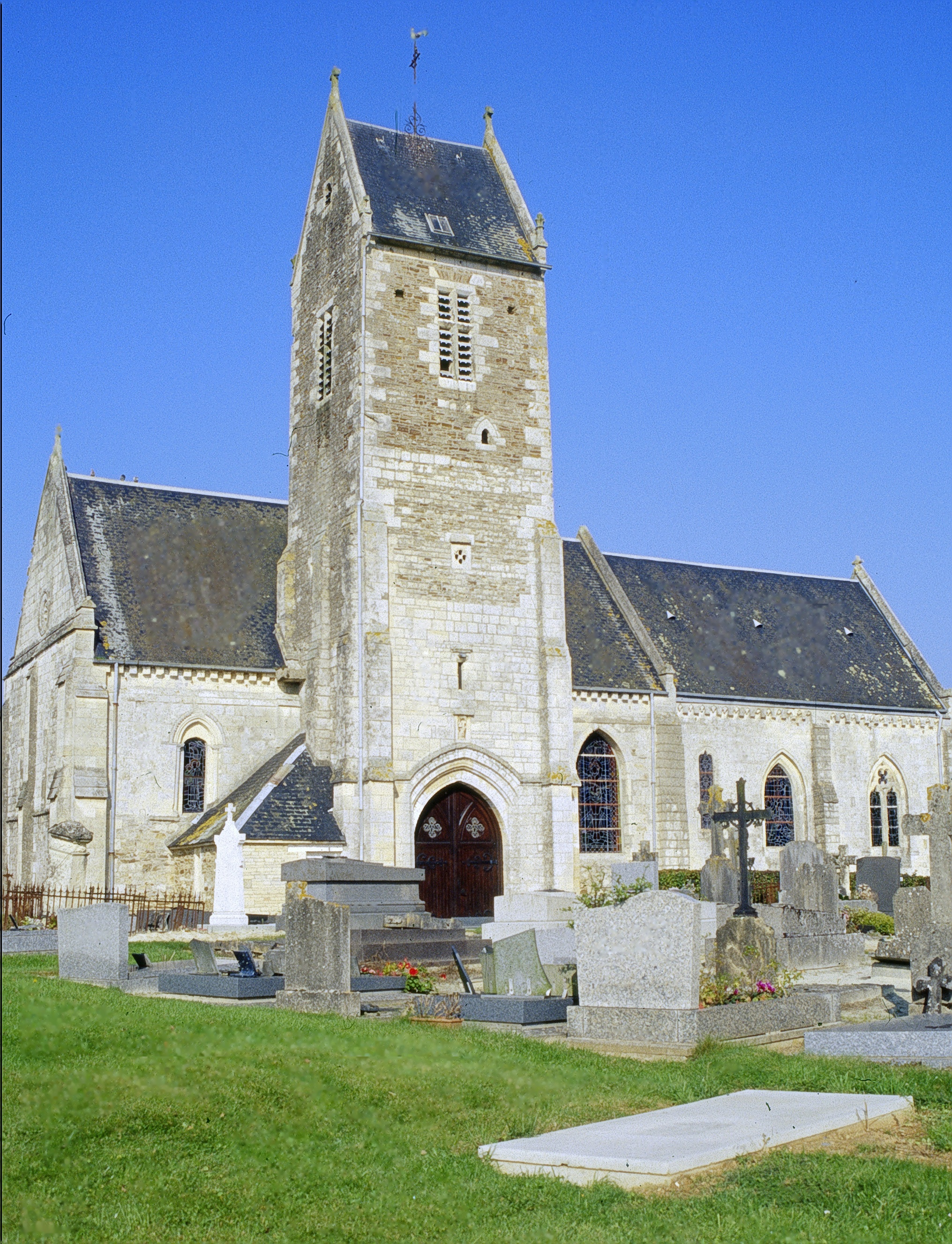
- Saint-Jacques
- Location of Le Locheur
- Location within France Location within Normandy
- Coordinates: 49°06′16″N 0°33′05″W
- Country: France
- Region: Normandy
- Department: Calvados
- Arrondissement: Caen
- Canton: Les Monts d'Aunay
- Commune: Val d'Arry
- Area^{1}: 3.68 km^{2} (1.42 sq mi)
- Highest elevation: 131 m (430 ft)
- Lowest elevation: 50 m (160 ft)
- Population (2023): 262
  - Density: 71.2/km^{2} (184/sq mi)
- Time zone: UTC+01:00 (CET)
  - Summer (DST): UTC+02:00 (CEST)
- Postal code: 14210
- ^{1} French Land Register data, which excludes lakes, ponds, glaciers > 1 km^{2} (0.386 sq mi or 247 acres) and river estuaries.

Le Locheur (French pronunciation: [lə lɔʃœʁ]) is a former commune in the Calvados department in the Normandy region in northwestern France. On 1 January 2017, it was merged into the new commune Val d'Arry.

== See also ==
- Communes of the Calvados department
