= Missy, Calvados =

Missy
- Part of Val d'Arry
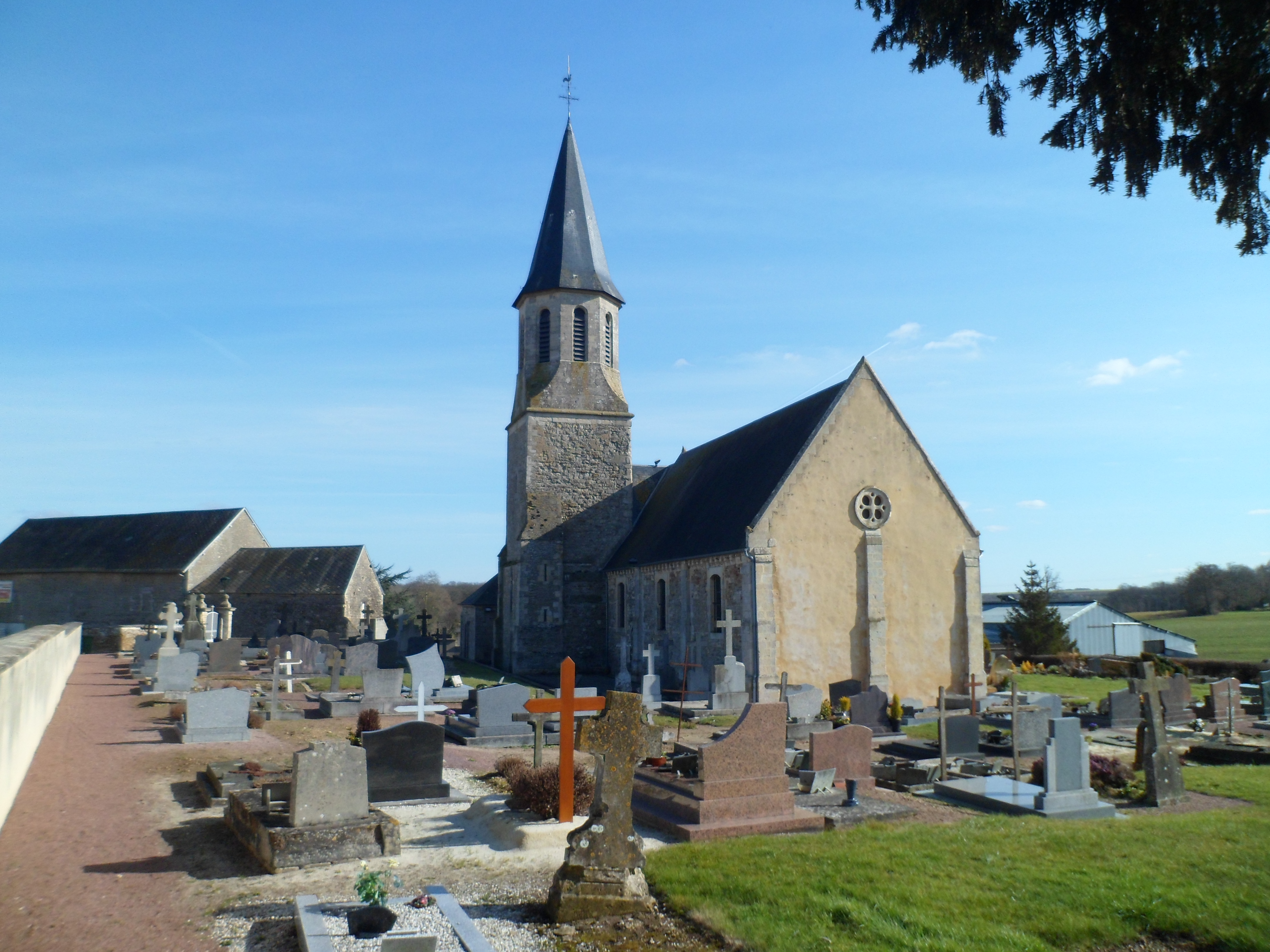

- Coat of arms
- Location of Missy
- Location within France Location within Normandy
- Coordinates: 49°07′21″N 0°33′01″W
- Country: France
- Region: Normandy
- Department: Calvados
- Arrondissement: Caen
- Canton: Les Monts d'Aunay
- Commune: Val d'Arry
- Area^{1}: 5.06 km^{2} (1.95 sq mi)
- Elevation: 95 m (312 ft)
- Highest elevation: 120 m (390 ft)
- Lowest elevation: 47 m (154 ft)
- Population (2023): 560
  - Density: 110/km^{2} (290/sq mi)
- Time zone: UTC+01:00 (CET)
  - Summer (DST): UTC+02:00 (CEST)
- Postal code: 14210
- ^{1} French Land Register data, which excludes lakes, ponds, glaciers > 1 km^{2} (0.386 sq mi or 247 acres) and river estuaries.

Missy (French pronunciation: [misi]) is a former commune in the Calvados department in the Normandy region in northwestern France. On 1 January 2016, it was merged into the new commune of Noyers-Missy, which became part of the new commune Val d'Arry on 1 January 2017.

== See also ==
- Communes of the Calvados department
