= Rouffigny =

Commune in Manche, France

- Part of Villedieu-les-Poêles-Rouffigny
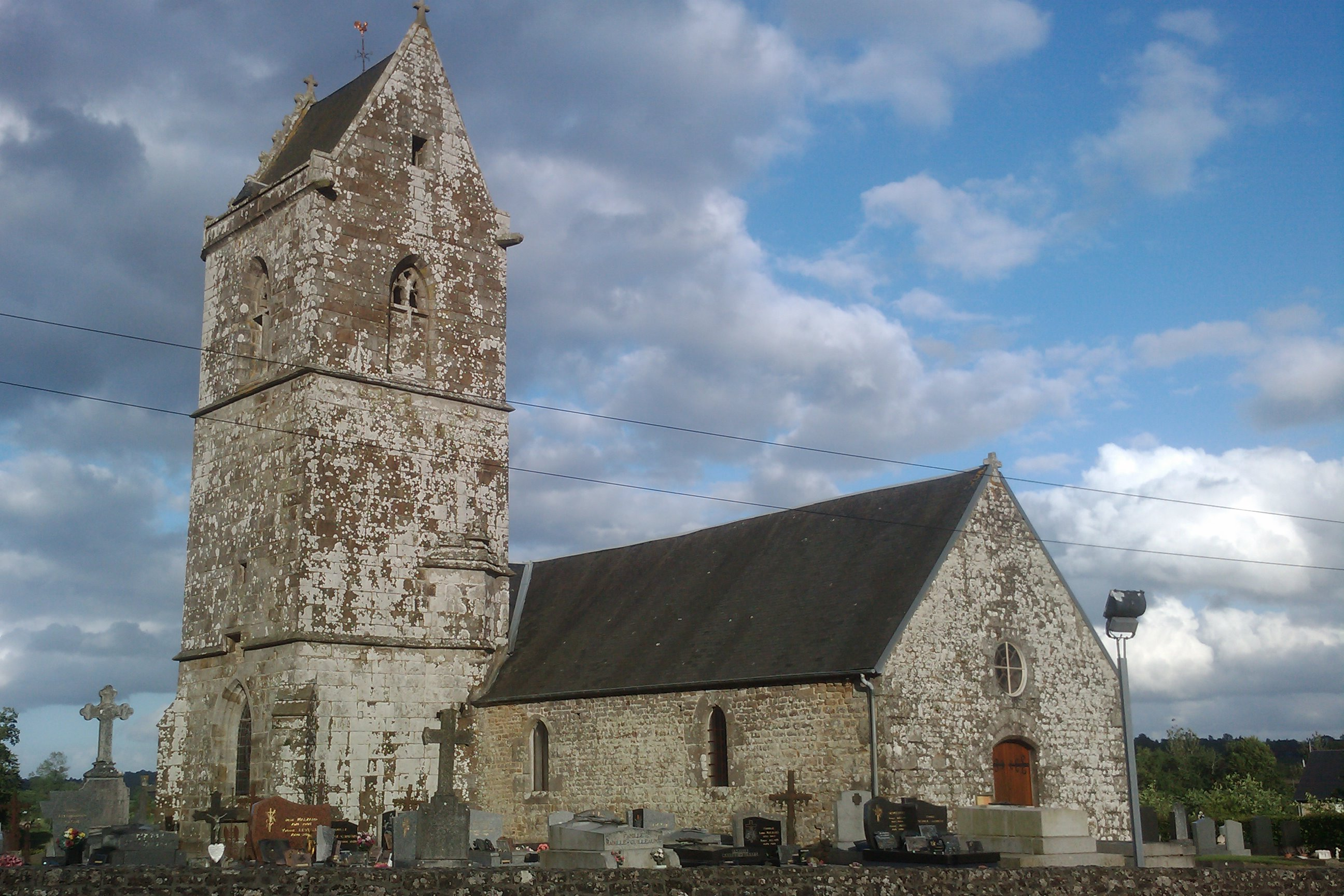
- The church of Notre-Dame
- Location of Rouffigny
- Location within France Location within Normandy
- Coordinates: 48°48′16″N 1°15′09″W
- Country: France
- Region: Normandy
- Department: Manche
- Arrondissement: Saint-Lô
- Canton: Villedieu-les-Poêles
- Commune: Villedieu-les-Poêles-Rouffigny
- Area^{1}: 6.72 km^{2} (2.59 sq mi)
- Highest elevation: 206 m (676 ft)
- Lowest elevation: 125 m (410 ft)
- Population (2022): 311
  - Density: 46.3/km^{2} (120/sq mi)
- Time zone: UTC+01:00 (CET)
  - Summer (DST): UTC+02:00 (CEST)
- Postal code: 50800
- ^{1} French Land Register data, which excludes lakes, ponds, glaciers > 1 km^{2} (0.386 sq mi or 247 acres) and river estuaries.

Rouffigny is a former commune in the Manche department in Normandy in north-western France. On 1 January 2016, it was merged into the new commune of Villedieu-les-Poêles-Rouffigny.

== See also ==
- Communes of the Manche department
