= Villedieu-les-Poêles-Rouffigny =

- Commune
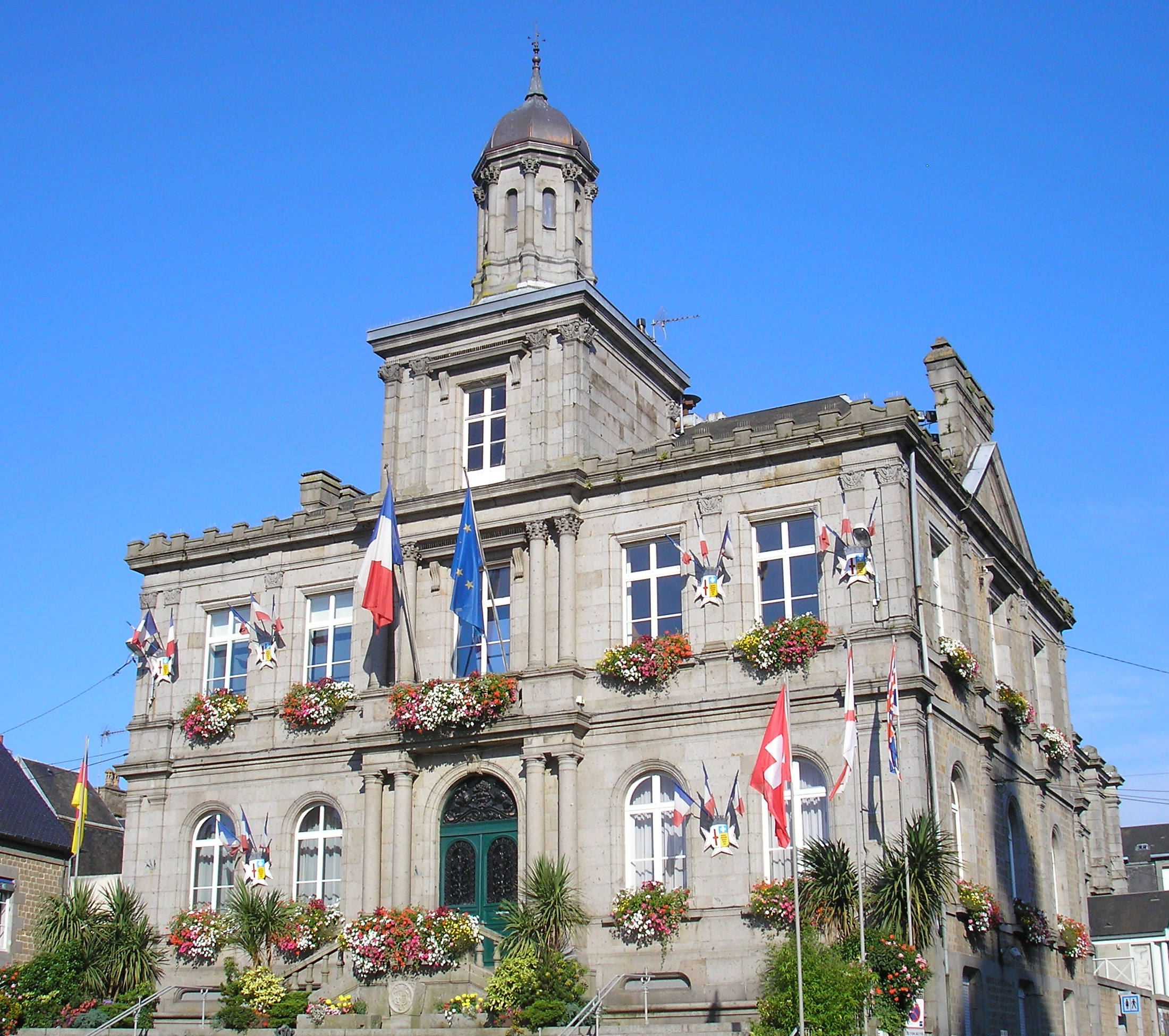
- The town hall in Villedieu-les-Poêles

- Coat of arms
- Location of Villedieu-les-Poêles-Rouffigny
- Location within France Location within Normandy
- Coordinates: 48°50′17″N 1°13′19″W
- Country: France
- Region: Normandy
- Department: Manche
- Arrondissement: Saint-Lô
- Canton: Villedieu-les-Poêles-Rouffigny
- Intercommunality: Villedieu Intercom
- Area^{1}: 14.77 km^{2} (5.70 sq mi)
- Population (2023): 3,903
  - Density: 264.3/km^{2} (684.4/sq mi)
- Time zone: UTC+01:00 (CET)
  - Summer (DST): UTC+02:00 (CEST)
- INSEE/Postal code: 50639 /50800
- ^{1} French Land Register data, which excludes lakes, ponds, glaciers > 1 km^{2} (0.386 sq mi or 247 acres) and river estuaries.

Villedieu-les-Poêles-Rouffigny is a commune in the department of Manche, northwestern France. The municipality was established on 1 January 2016 by merger of the former communes of Villedieu-les-Poêles (the seat) and Rouffigny. Villedieu-les-Poêles station has rail connections to Argentan, Paris and Granville.

Villedieu-les-Poêlese is listed as a Village étape.

== Population ==
Population data refer to the area corresponding with the commune as of January 2025.

Historical population
Year	Pop.	±% p.a.
1968	4,345	—
1975	4,608	+0.84%
1982	4,942	+1.00%
1990	4,626	−0.82%
1999	4,383	−0.60%
2007	4,219	−0.48%
2012	4,079	−0.67%
2017	3,878	−1.01%
2023	3,903	+0.11%
Source: INSEE

== See also ==
- Communes of the Manche department
