= Tournay-sur-Odon =

- Part of Val d'Arry
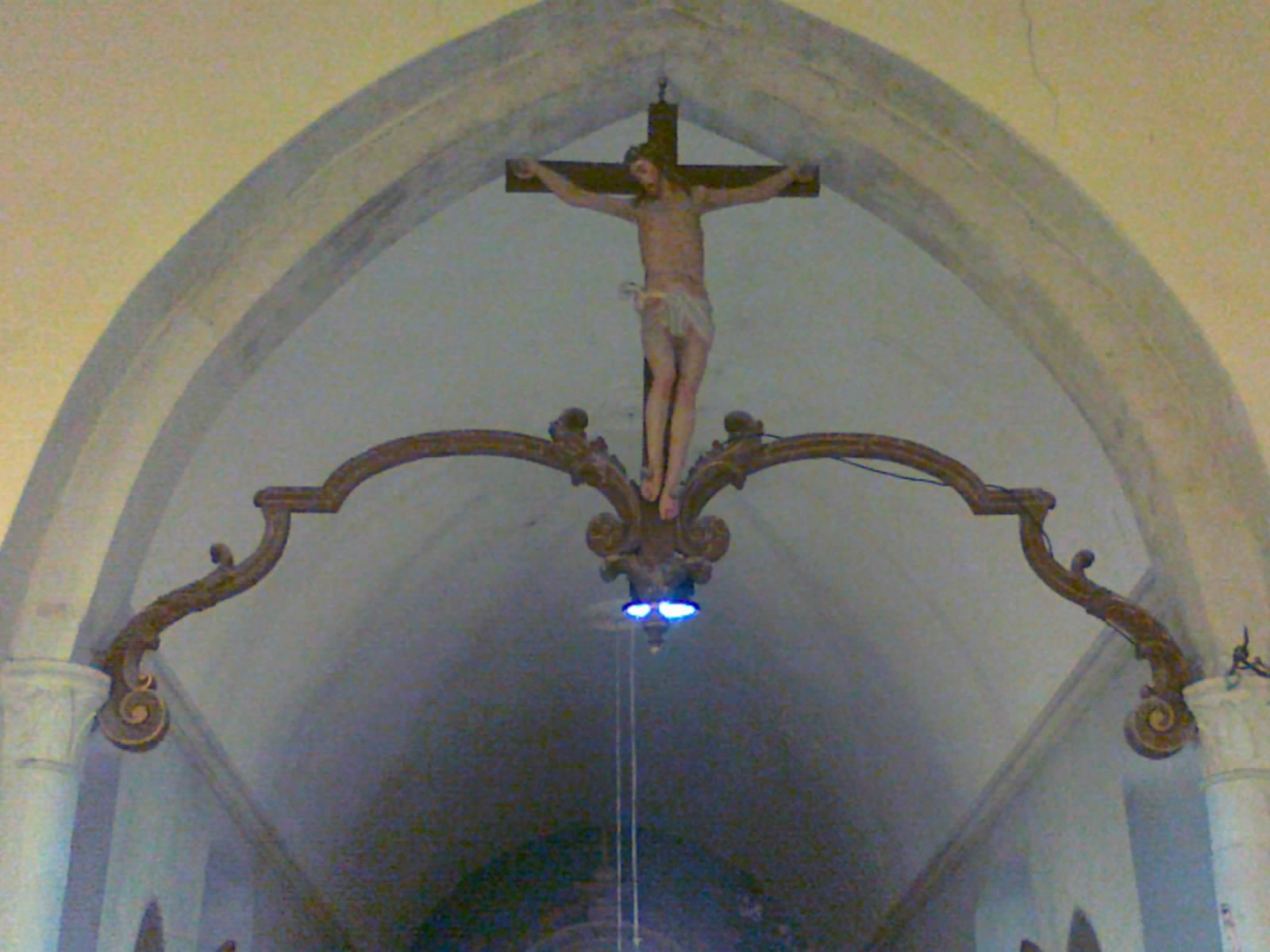
- Location of Tournay-sur-Odon
- Location within France Location within Normandy
- Coordinates: 49°05′31″N 0°35′12″W
- Country: France
- Region: Normandy
- Department: Calvados
- Arrondissement: Caen
- Canton: Les Monts d'Aunay
- Commune: Val d'Arry
- Area^{1}: 6.93 km^{2} (2.68 sq mi)
- Elevation: 123 m (404 ft)
- Highest elevation: 173 m (568 ft)
- Lowest elevation: 58 m (190 ft)
- Population (2023): 359
  - Density: 51.8/km^{2} (134/sq mi)
- Time zone: UTC+01:00 (CET)
  - Summer (DST): UTC+02:00 (CEST)
- Postal code: 14310
- ^{1} French Land Register data, which excludes lakes, ponds, glaciers > 1 km^{2} (0.386 sq mi or 247 acres) and river estuaries.

Tournay-sur-Odon (French pronunciation: [tuʁnɛ syʁ ɔdɔ̃]; literally: Tournay on the Odon River) is a former commune in the department of Calvados, region of Normandy, northwestern France. On 1 January 2017, it was merged into the new commune Val d'Arry. The village lies near the river Odon.

== See also ==
- Communes of the Calvados department
