= Tramain =

Tramain Tremaen
- Commune
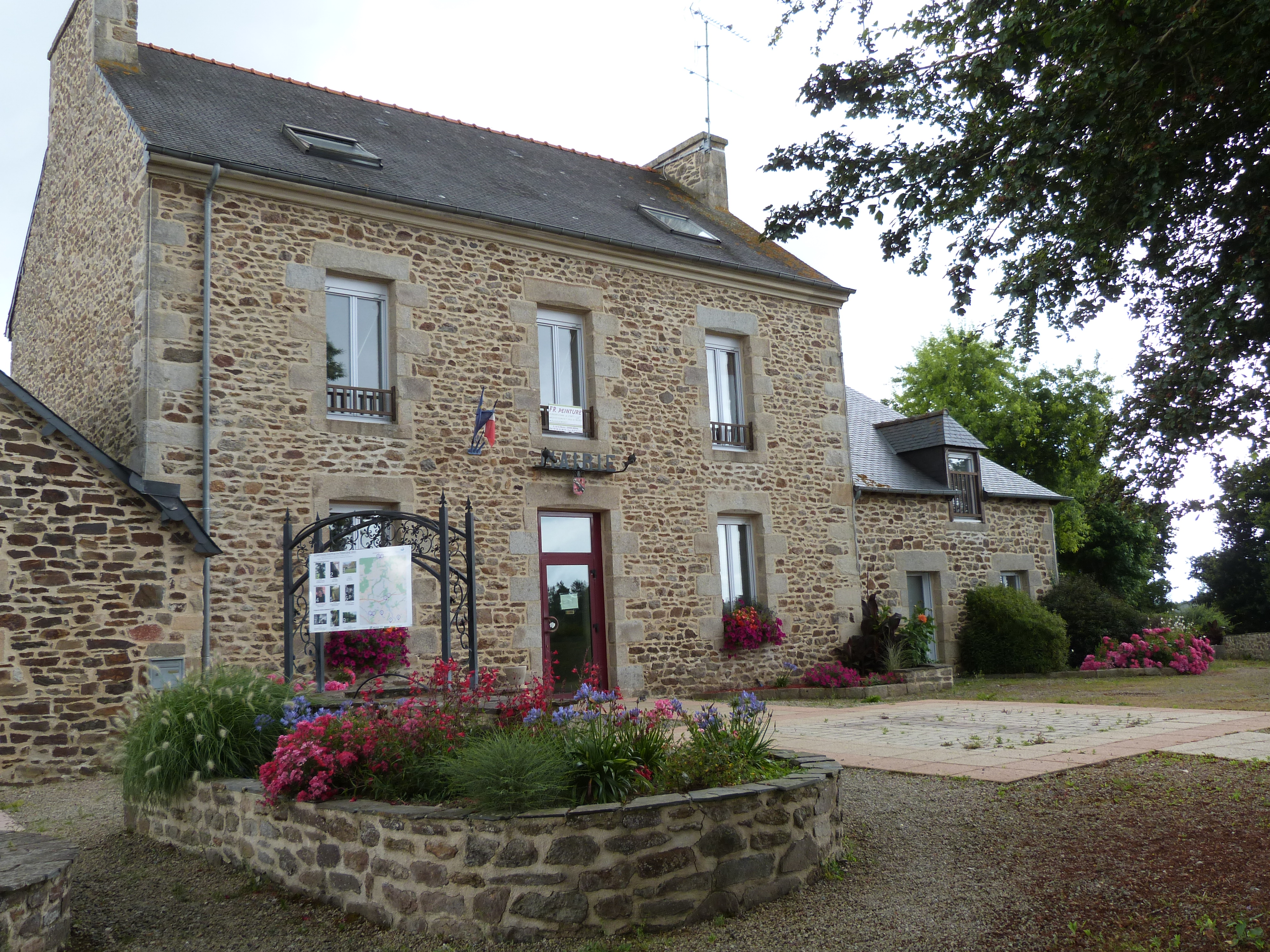
- The town hall of Tramain

- Coat of arms
- Location of Tramain
- Location within France Location within Brittany
- Coordinates: 48°24′06″N 2°24′03″W
- Country: France
- Region: Brittany
- Department: Côtes-d'Armor
- Arrondissement: Saint-Brieuc
- Canton: Plénée-Jugon
- Intercommunality: CA Lamballe Terre et Mer

Government
  - Mayor (2022–2026): Benoit Despres
- Area^{1}: 9.25 km^{2} (3.57 sq mi)
- Highest elevation: 131 m (430 ft)
- Lowest elevation: 37 m (121 ft)
- Population (2023): 704
  - Density: 76.1/km^{2} (197/sq mi)
- Time zone: UTC+01:00 (CET)
  - Summer (DST): UTC+02:00 (CEST)
- INSEE/Postal code: 22341 /22640
- ^{1} French Land Register data, which excludes lakes, ponds, glaciers > 1 km^{2} (0.386 sq mi or 247 acres) and river estuaries.

Tramain (French pronunciation: [tʁamɛ̃]; Breton: Tremaen; Gallo: Tramaen) is a commune in the Côtes-d'Armor department of Brittany in northwestern France.

== Population ==
Historical population
Year	Pop.	±% p.a.
1968	463	—
1975	473	+0.31%
1982	460	−0.40%
1990	483	+0.61%
1999	527	+0.97%
2007	642	+2.50%
2012	669	+0.83%
2017	694	+0.74%
2023	704	+0.24%
Source: INSEE

Inhabitants of Tramain are called traminois in French.

== See also ==
- Communes of the Côtes-d'Armor department
