= Ponts, Manche =

Ponts
- Commune
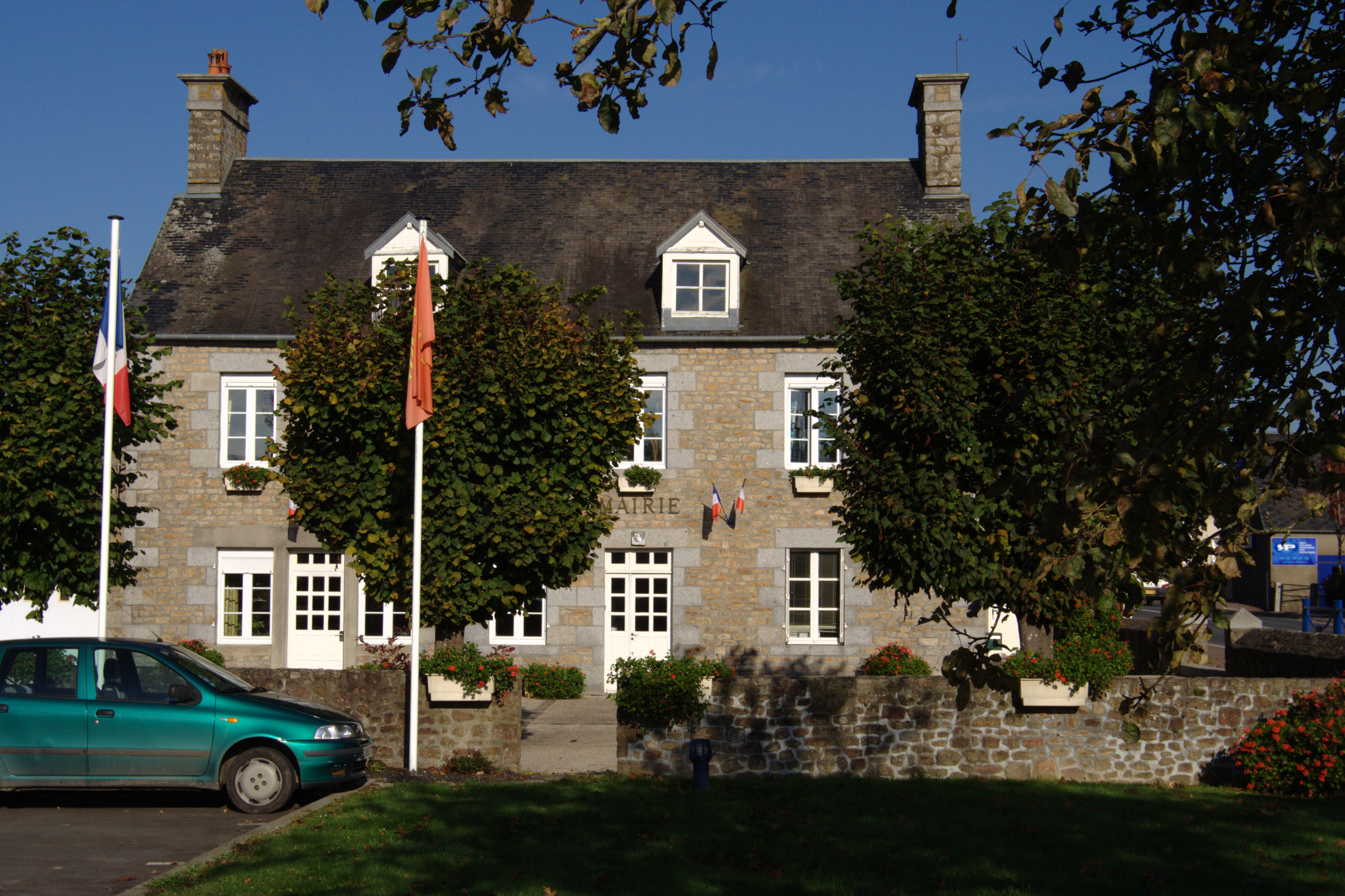
- Town hall
- Location of Ponts
- Location within France Location within Normandy
- Coordinates: 48°42′15″N 1°20′38″W
- Country: France
- Region: Normandy
- Department: Manche
- Arrondissement: Avranches
- Canton: Avranches
- Intercommunality: CA Mont-Saint-Michel-Normandie

Government
  - Mayor (2020–2026): Jocelyne Allain
- Area^{1}: 6.70 km^{2} (2.59 sq mi)
- Elevation: 12 m (39 ft)
- Highest elevation: 72 m (236 ft)
- Lowest elevation: 7 m (23 ft)
- Population (2023): 708
  - Density: 106/km^{2} (274/sq mi)
- Time zone: UTC+01:00 (CET)
  - Summer (DST): UTC+02:00 (CEST)
- INSEE/Postal code: 50411 /50300
- ^{1} French Land Register data, which excludes lakes, ponds, glaciers > 1 km^{2} (0.386 sq mi or 247 acres) and river estuaries.

Ponts (French pronunciation: [pɔ̃]; sometimes referred to as Ponts-sous-Avranches, literally Ponts under Avranches) is a commune in the Manche department in north-western France.

== See also ==
- Communes of the Manche department
