= Périphérique (Caen) =

Ring road in Caen, France

National road 814
- Route nationale 814
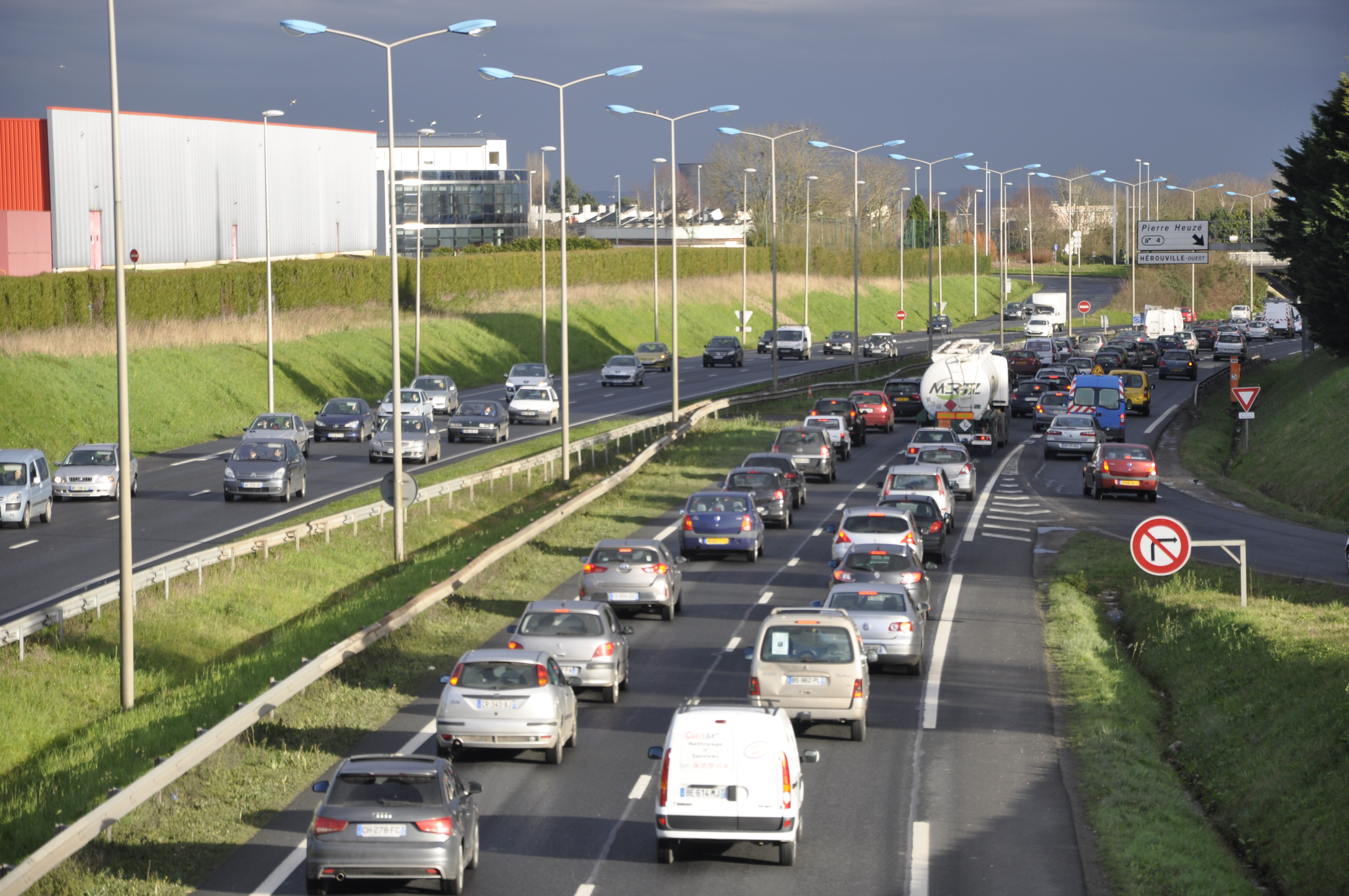

Route information
- Part of E46
- Length: 28 km (17 mi)
- Existed: 1997–present

Major junctions
- East end: Porte de Paris for A13
- A 13; A 88; D 562; A 84; N 13; D 515
- West end: Porte de Bretagne for A84

Location
- Country: France
- Major cities: Caen

Highway system
- Roads in France; Autoroutes; Routes nationales

The Boulevard périphérique de Caen is a ring road circling the French city of Caen. It is the route nationale 814. Traveling speed on the road is limited to 90 km/h (55 mph) between the Exit 13 and 8, with a brief portion near the Exit 1 as well as the Viaduc de Calix limited to 70 km/h (45 mph) and 110 km/h (70 mph) elsewhere. It is a 4-lane hard-shouldered road that was finished on 30 September 1997. The total length of the périphérique de Caen is 26 km (16 mi).

Notable features include the Viaduc de Calix which spans the River Orne and Canal de Caen à la Mer.

== History ==
The idea of creating an urban bypass boulevard dates back to 1931 with the Dauger urbanization plan. The plan was a question of improving traffic by organizing peripheral traffic by means of a boulevard connecting radial roads, so as to form a radioconcentric network. It was revived in the early 1970s with the urban development of the city. The ring road was opened in stages:

- 13 December 1975: opening of the eastern ring road between the Route de Falaise and the Route de la Délivrande.
- 19 May 1976: opening of the northern ring road between Route de la Délivrande and Boulevard Weygand (now Boulevard Jean Moulin)
- 31 July 1976: extension of the northern ring road between Boulevard Weygand (now Boulevard Jean Moulin) and Chemin Vert
- 28 August 1976: junction between the ring road and the N13 (2,500 metres)
- 13 September 1978: Déclaration d'utilité publique for the section between the roads of Cherbourg (N13) and Brittany (N175)
- 30 September 1997: opening of the last section between Fleury-sur-Orne and Bretteville-sur-Odon

As of 26 April 2015, the ring road is no longer lit at night except on the Viaduc de Calix and the Bessin and Porte de Paris interchanges.

=== Further work ===
==== Northern part ====
In order to relieve congestion in the northern ring road, a third lane was planned between the Viaduc de Calix and Le Chemin-Vert. Work began in March 2017 with preliminary tree felling work along the relevant section.

Work on the Hamelin ramp began on 15 April 2021 with improvements on the D60. The construction of the ramp itself was carried out in the second half of 2021; it was commissioned on 27 July 2022.

== List of junctions ==
Department	Location	km	mi	Junction	Destinations	Notes
Calvados	Mondeville	0.0	0.0	A 13 - 1 Porte de Paris	Paris, Rouen, Le Havre, Deauville, Mondeville and Giberville	
Calvados	Mondeville	1.4	0.9	D 513 - 2 Presqu'île-Rives de l'Orne	Mondeville, Colombelles, Caen station; Route de la Côte Fleurie	
Calvados	Hérouville-Saint-Clair	2.9	1.8	D 515 - 3 Porte d'Angleterre	Ouistreham, Caen (Saint-Jean-Eudes)	
Calvados	Hérouville-Saint-Clair	3.8	2.4	4 Pierre Heuzé	Hérouville-Saint-Clair, Caen (Pierre Heuzé)	
Calvados	Caen	5.2	3.2	D 7 - 5 Côte de Nacre	Douvres-la-Délivrande, Épron, Caen (campus 1, Calvaire Saint-Pierre)	
Calvados	Caen	6.2	3.9	6 Vallée des Jardins	Saint-Contest, Caen (Vallée des Jardins, La Folie Couvrechef - Mémorial)	
Calvados	Caen	8.0	5.0	D 401 - 7 Chemin Vert	Saint-Germain-la-Blanche-Herbe, Caen (Chemin vert, La Maladrerie)	
Calvados	Saint-Germain-la-Blanche-Herbe	9.9	6.2	N 13 - 8 Porte de Bessin	Cherbourg, Bayeux	
Calvados	Bretteville-sur-Odon	13.2	8.2	A 84 - 9 Porte de Bretagne	Vire-Normandie, Rennes, Nantes	
Calvados	Éterville	14.6	9.1	D 8 - 10 Éterville	Louvigny, Caen (la Prairie)	
Calvados	Ifs	18.1	11.2	11 Suisse Normande	Flers, Fleury-sur-Orne, Caen (Grâce de Dieu)	
Calvados	Ifs	21.0	13.1	12 Ifs	Ifs, Caen (campus 3)	
Calvados	Ifs	22.1	13.7	N 158 - 13 Porte d'Espagne	Alençon, Le Mans, Tours	
Calvados	Cormelles-le-Royal	23.3	14.5	D 229 - 14 Cormelles	Cormelles-le-Royal, Caen (Guérinière)	
Calvados	Cormelles-le-Royal	24.5	15.2	15 Vallée Sèche	Grentheville, Caen (Sainte-Thérèse)	
Calvados	Mondeville	26.6	16.3	D 613 - 16 Pays d'Auge	Lisieux, Caen (Demi-Lune)	
1.000 mi = 1.609 km; 1.000 km = 0.621 mi
