= Val d'Arry =

- Commune
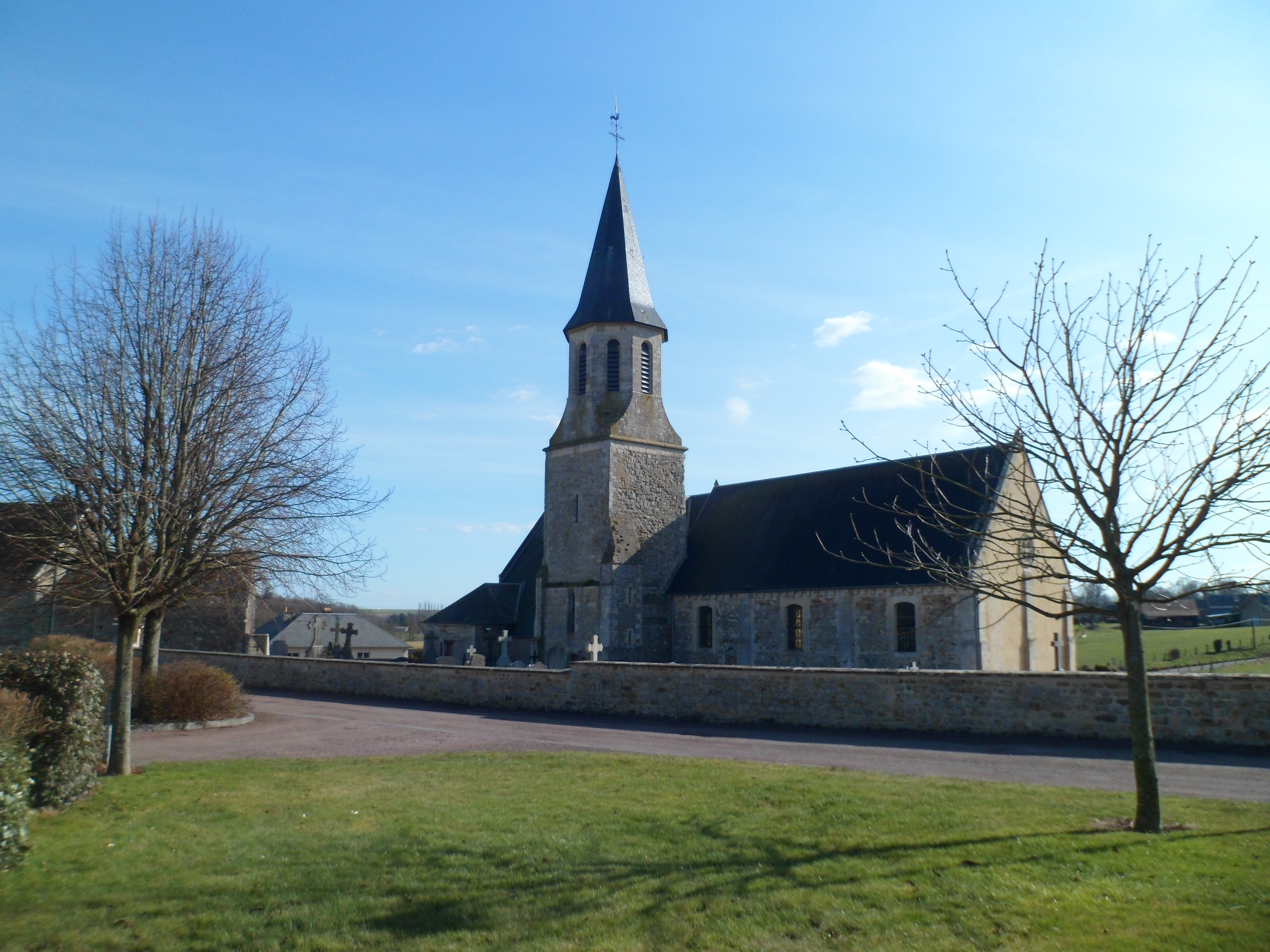
- The church in Missy
- Location of Val d'Arry
- Location within France Location within Normandy
- Coordinates: 49°07′19″N 0°34′01″W
- Country: France
- Region: Normandy
- Department: Calvados
- Arrondissement: Vire
- Canton: Les Monts d'Aunay
- Intercommunality: Pré-Bocage Intercom

Government
  - Mayor (2020–2026): Christian Vengeons
- Area^{1}: 24.54 km^{2} (9.47 sq mi)
- Population (2023): 2,496
  - Density: 101.7/km^{2} (263.4/sq mi)
- Time zone: UTC+01:00 (CET)
  - Summer (DST): UTC+02:00 (CEST)
- INSEE/Postal code: 14475 /14210, 14310
- ^{1} French Land Register data, which excludes lakes, ponds, glaciers > 1 km^{2} (0.386 sq mi or 247 acres) and river estuaries.

Val d'Arry (French pronunciation: [val daʁi]) is a commune in the department of Calvados, northwestern France. The municipality was established on 1 January 2017 by merger of the former communes of Noyers-Missy (the seat), Le Locheur and Tournay-sur-Odon.

== Geography ==
The commune is made up of the following collection of villages and hamlets, Brettevillette, Missy, Noyers-Bocage, La Flaguais, La Félière, Val d'Arry, Ragny, Villodon and La Bruyère.

Two rivers flow through the commune, The Odon and the Ajon. In addition five streams the Ruisseau de la Pigaciere, Ruisseau de la Picardiere, Ruisseau d'O, Ruisseau du Val Chesnel and the Ruisseau du Douet Banneville traverse the commune.

== Population ==
Population data refer to the commune in its geography as of January 2025.

Historical population
Year	Pop.	±% p.a.
1968	1,256	—
1975	1,293	+0.42%
1982	1,394	+1.08%
1990	1,741	+2.82%
1999	1,911	+1.04%
2007	2,330	+2.51%
2012	2,276	−0.47%
2017	2,256	−0.18%
2023	2,496	+1.70%
Source: INSEE

== Points of Interest ==
=== National Heritage sites ===
The Commune has two buildings and areas listed as a Monument historique

- Église Saint-Jacques du Locheur a church listed as a monument in 1928.
- Eglise Saint-Jean-Baptiste a thirteenth century church, listed as a monument in 1927.

=== Architecture contemporaine remarquable ===
- Église de l'Assomption Notre-Dame - a church built between 1954 and 1960 and designed by the architect Charles Musetti, in 2002 it was awarded the Architecture contemporaine remarquable label.

== See also ==
- Communes of the Calvados department
