= Villedieu-les-Poêles =

Commune in Manche, France

- Part of Villedieu-les-Poêles-Rouffigny
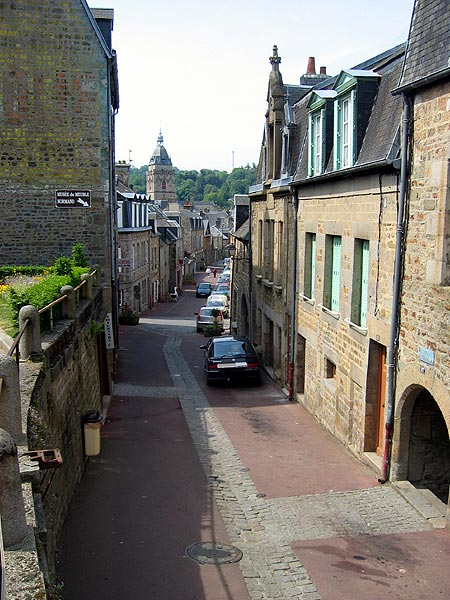
- Location of Villedieu-les-Poêles
- Location within France Location within Normandy
- Coordinates: 48°50′N 1°13′W
- Country: France
- Region: Normandy
- Department: Manche
- Arrondissement: Saint-Lô
- Canton: Villedieu-les-Poêles
- Commune: Villedieu-les-Poêles-Rouffigny
- Area^{1}: 8.05 km^{2} (3.11 sq mi)
- Highest elevation: 105 m (344 ft)
- Population (2022): 3,534
  - Density: 439/km^{2} (1,140/sq mi)
- Time zone: UTC+01:00 (CET)
  - Summer (DST): UTC+02:00 (CEST)
- Postal code: 50800
- ^{1} French Land Register data, which excludes lakes, ponds, glaciers > 1 km^{2} (0.386 sq mi or 247 acres) and river estuaries.

Villedieu-les-Poêles (before 1962: Villedieu) is a former commune in the Manche department in Normandy in north-western France. On 1 January 2016, it was merged into the new commune of Villedieu-les-Poêles-Rouffigny.

Its inhabitants are called Sourdins from the French sourd meaning deaf. Historically, much of the population were involved in the manufacturing of copper pans, which involved repeated hammering, and many became deaf.

== Geography ==
Pont-Farcy lies to the east, Saint-Lô to the north, Vire to the South-East and Granville to the west. The river Sienne flows through the town.

== Economy ==
It is traditionally a centre of metal-work, especially the brass and copper pans and basins from which the poêles in its name derives. It is also famous for its artisanal manufacture of large church bells, which was started by immigrants from Lorraine around 1780.

In addition to metal-work, there is a cheese factory. Tourism now plays a large part in the local economy. Villedieu also provides services for the surrounding countryside, such as a hospital and a retirement home.

== History ==
Villedieu owes its name to the religious order Knights Hospitaller, which later became the Knights of Malta. Henry I, King of England and Duke of Normandy, granted Villedieu to this order in the 12th century. Low taxes and good administration attracted people to Villedieu. Advanced coppersmithing technology was presumably imported from the Middle East by the Knights. By the early 14th century, the Corporation of the Coppersmiths of Villedieu was officially recognized by the Kings of France.

In the years following the French Revolution, in the late 18th century, the people of Villedieu were strong supporters, unlike most of people in the surrounding area. A major reason of their support was that it abolished customs duties between French regions; before the Revolution, copper pans exported from Villedieu to Brittany, 50 km (31 mi) away, faced higher import duties than copper pans from Portugal. After a losing battle with Chouan troops, the men from Villedieu escaped thanks to their women, who threw stones, flowerpots and chamber pots from second-story windows at the pursuing Chouans. The general heading the Chouan troops was getting ready to bombard Villedieu and set it on fire. A delegation of women negotiated with him: the inhabitants were given a short time to hide their valuables, and the Chouan soldiers then plundered the town for food and clothing.

In 1944, when the Germans withdrew from Villedieu, they left a sniper who shot some of the first US soldiers to enter Villedieu, before being neutralized. The US commander was about to request airplane bombing runs when the mayor approached him, told him that there were no Germans left in Villedieu and offered to ride through Villedieu in the front seat of a US jeep. Villedieu was thus one of the few towns in the region to escape major destruction.

=== Heraldry ===
Arms of Villedieu-les-Poêles	The arms of Villedieu-les-Poêles are blazoned : Per pale 1: Argent, a cross couped gules; and 2: Or, 18 billets sable 4,5,4,3,2, and on a chief azure, a cross couped argent.

== See also ==
- Communes of the Manche department
