= Canton of Boulogne-sur-Mer-Sud =

Coordinates: 50°43′10″N 1°39′28″E

Boulogne-sur-Mer-Sud
- Former canton
- Interactive map of Boulogne-sur-Mer-Sud
- Country: France
- Region: Hauts-de-France
- Department: Pas-de-Calais
- No. of communes: {{{nbcomm}}}
- Disbanded: 2015
- Population (2012): 22,763

The canton of Boulogne-sur-Mer-Sud is a former canton situated in the department of the Pas-de-Calais and in the Nord-Pas-de-Calais region of northern France. It was disbanded following the French canton reorganisation which came into effect in March 2015. It had a total of 22,763 inhabitants (2012, without double counting).

== Geography ==
The canton is organised around Boulogne-sur-Mer in the arrondissement of Boulogne-sur-Mer. The altitude varies from 0m (Boulogne-sur-Mer) to 188m (Saint-Martin-Boulogne) for an average altitude of 46m.

The canton comprised 5 communes:

- Baincthun
- Boulogne-sur-Mer (partly)
- Echinghen
- Saint-Martin-Boulogne
- La Capelle-lès-Boulogne

== See also ==
- Cantons of Pas-de-Calais
- Communes of Pas-de-Calais
- Arrondissements of the Pas-de-Calais department
