= Lac des Miroirs =

Lake in Condette, France

Lac des miroirs
- Mirrors Lake
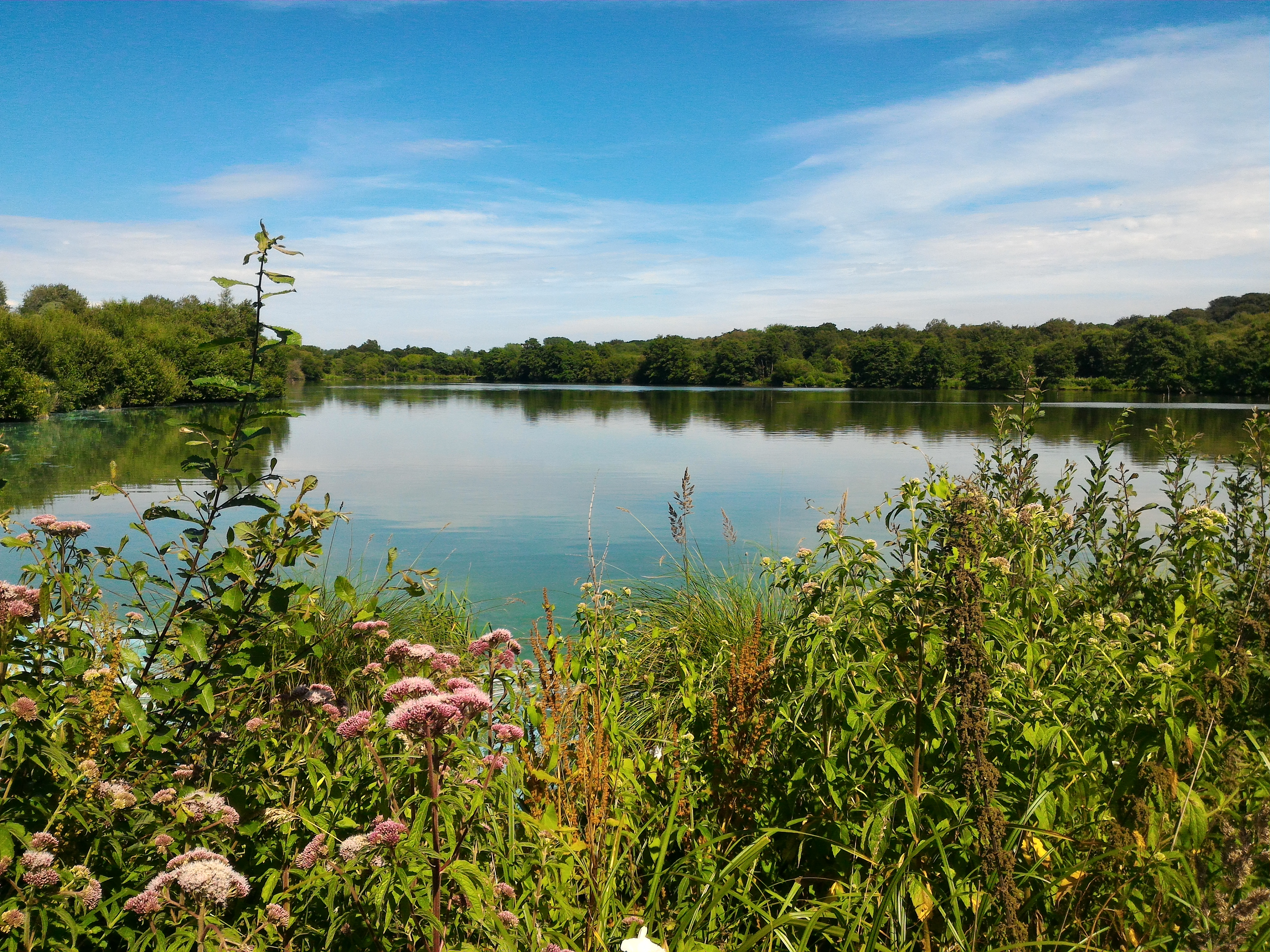

- Location within Hauts-de-France
- Location: Condette, northern France
- Coordinates: 50°38′37″N 1°36′50″E
- Basin countries: France
- Max. length: 0.470 km (0.292 mi)
- Max. width: 0.120 km (0.075 mi)
- Surface area: 5 ha (12 acres)
- Surface elevation: 25 m (82 ft)
- Settlements: Boulogne-sur-Mer

Lac des Miroirs (English translation: Mirrors Lake) is a lake in Condette in the north of France.

The lake is situated between the village of Condette and the seaside resort of Hardelot, near the Écault Forest and the Hardelot Castle. It is located in the Réserve naturelle régionale du marais de Condette.

== History ==
The marsh was formed toward the end of the 16th century, when the coastal dunes, moving inland, separated the river from the sea and formed the marshlands. The lake itself is the result of peat extraction that occurred in the late 1800s.

The Lake was previously dedicated to leisure activities, with pedal boats and fishing available. Between 2005 and 2008, the lake, as well as the surrounding natural area, was transformed from an into a nature preserve, with walking paths and signage added at a cost of €1.5 million.

== Flora & Fauna ==
Plant biodiversity is particularly high in the reserve. In 2008, 345 plant species were recorded, including heritage species such as the water buttercup (Ranunculus lingua), the prickly butcher's broom (Ruscus aculeatus), the marsh cinquefoil (Comarum palustre) and the royal fern (Osmunda regalis).

Walking on the marsh trail, one may spot a Grey Heron or a Great Crested Grebe.

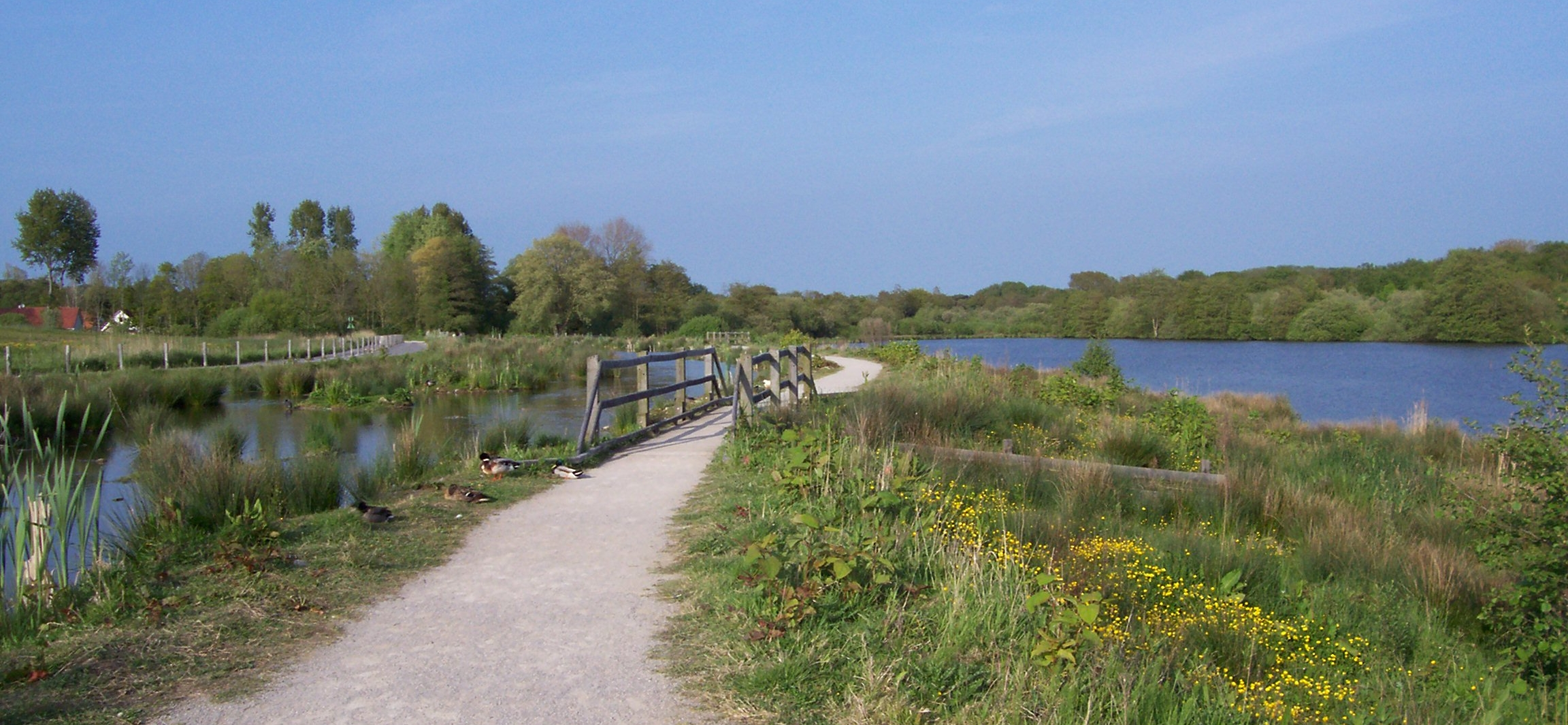
Nature reserve, 2009
