= Fort de la Crèche =

French coastal battery

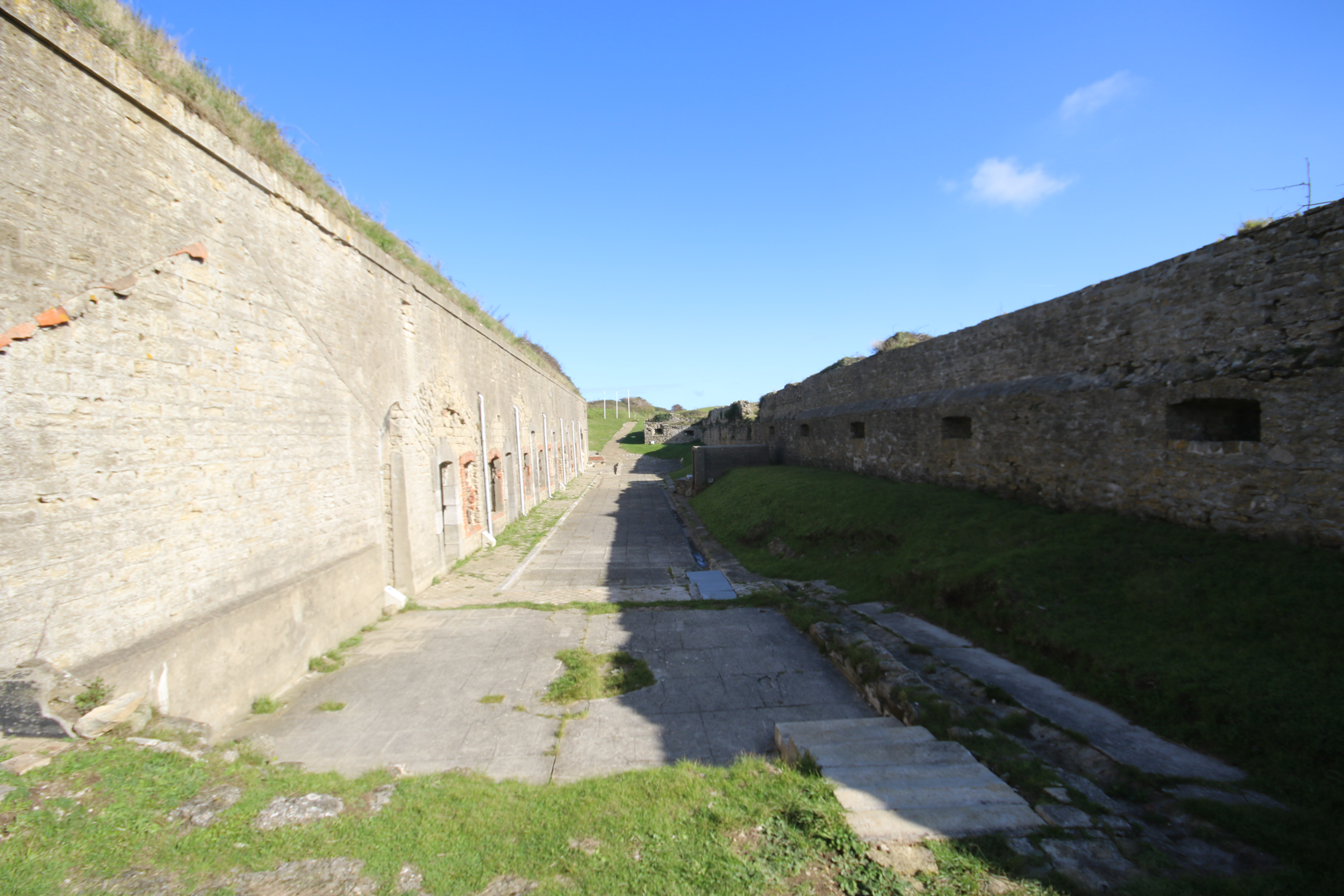

Site information
- Type: Coastal Battery

Location
- Coordinates: 50.748°N 1.601°E

Site history
- Built: 1879
- Fate: Disarmed

The Fort of the Crèche is a coastal battery of the Séré de Rivières system, whose construction was completed in 1879. It is near Wimereux, in the Pas-de-Calais on the tip of Pointe de la Crèche. It is built on the remains of a Napoleonic defense system consisting of Fort Terlincthun and a sea fort, opposite the tip of the cape, of which only the foundations remain.

== The Napoleonic camp of Boulogne ==
The Fort de Terlincthun was a simple mound of earth surrounded by a stone wall built by Napoleon I between 1806 and 1808. There is nothing of it left today.

Before the point of la Crèche (Wimereux, Pas-de-Calais), one can see the foundations of the offshore fort, identical to Heurt fort, built in 1803.

== Coast Battery ==
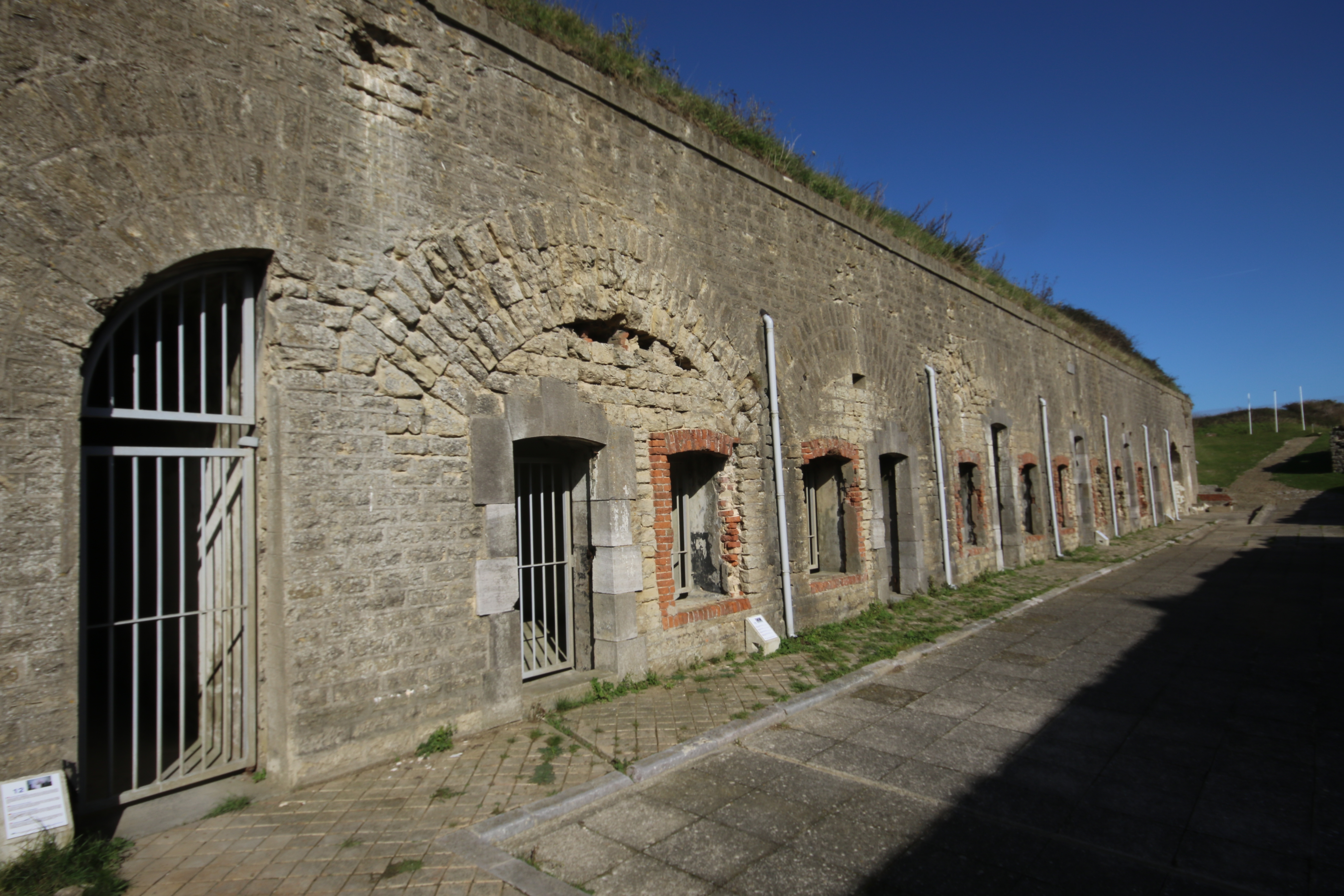
Former barracks

A Séré de Rivières system fortification was completed on the site in 1879, with three other forts:

- The battery of Cape Alprech (Le Portel)
- The battery of Mount Couppes (Le Portel)
- The battery Tour d'Ordre (Boulogne-sur-Mer).

They are all built on the same pattern (a barracks, a powder magazine, 2 or 3 shelters, 3-6 platforms for cannon and a well) and are surrounded by a stone wall and a dry moat. Together they protected the port of Boulogne.

Between the world wars, the battery of la Crèche was modernized. The old armament was replaced by four 194 mm guns (Mle 1902) each having two ammunition bunkers. The perimeter wall was partially demolished to make room for them.

During the First World War the fort defended the port of Boulogne-sur-Mer which played a strategic role in supply and in evacuation of the wounded.

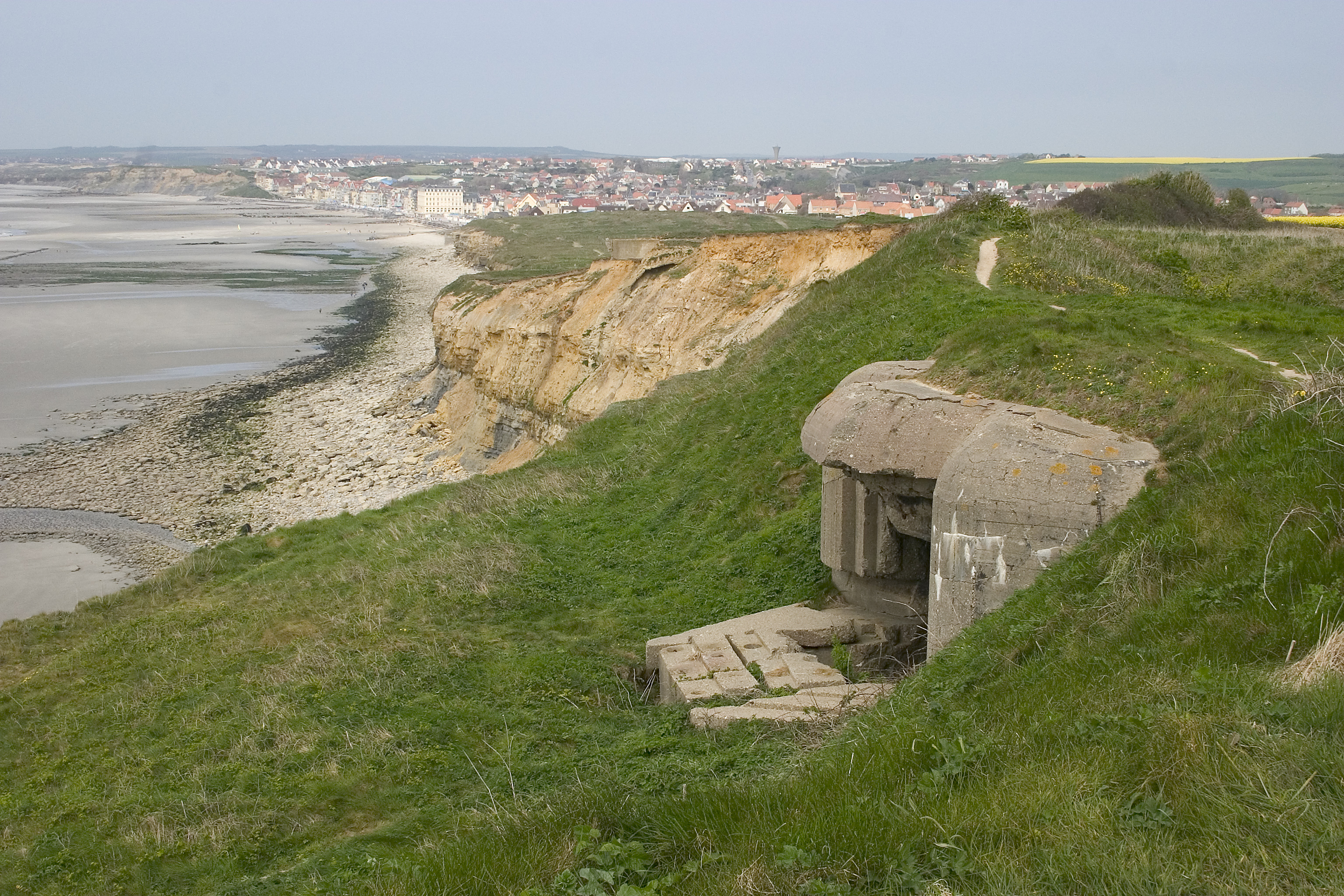
Gun emplacement overlooking the sea

During the Second World War, the fort was the scene of heavy fighting. The French destroyer Chacal was sunk off Portel while trying to stop the German advance. The German Navy took possession of the premises, concreted three French emplacements and replaced the weapons with 105 mm guns. The fort was liberated September 22, 1944, by the Queen's Own Rifles Canadian regiment. The Canadians had moved tanks and M10 self-propelled guns close to the fort overnight and the 500 men of the German garrison surrendered upon seeing them the following morning.

Today, the site is owned by the Conservatoire du littoral and the Association Fort de La Crèche (AFLC) has restored it.

=== External links ===
- fortdelacreche.fr : The site of l'Association Fort de La Crèche
