= Communauté d'agglomération du Boulonnais =

Coordinates: 50.72°N 1.61°E

Boulonnais
- Communauté d'agglomération
- Location within the Pas-de-Calais department
- Country: France
- Region: Hauts-de-France
- Department: Pas-de-Calais
- No. of communes: {{{nbcomm}}}
- Established: 2000
- Area: 205.10 km^{2} (79.19 sq mi)
- Population (2018): 112,836
  - Density: 550.15/km^{2} (1,424.9/sq mi)
- Website: www.agglo-boulonnais.fr

The Communauté d'agglomération du Boulonnais, created in January 2000, is a communauté d'agglomération (an intercommunal structure) centered on the city of Boulogne-sur-Mer. It is located in the Pas-de-Calais department, in the Hauts-de-France region in northern France. Its area is 205.1 km^{2}. Its population was 112,836 in 2018, of which 40,664 in Boulogne-sur-Mer proper.

== Composition ==
The communauté d'agglomération consists of the following 22 communes:

1. Baincthun
2. Boulogne-sur-Mer
3. La Capelle-lès-Boulogne
4. Condette
5. Conteville-lès-Boulogne
6. Dannes
7. Echinghen
8. Équihen-Plage
9. Hesdigneul-lès-Boulogne
10. Hesdin-l'Abbé
11. Isques
12. Nesles
13. Neufchâtel-Hardelot
14. Outreau
15. Pernes-lès-Boulogne
16. Pittefaux
17. Le Portel
18. Saint-Étienne-au-Mont
19. Saint-Léonard
20. Saint-Martin-Boulogne
21. Wimereux
22. Wimille

== See also ==
- Côte d'Opale
- Boulonnais
