= Canton of Boulogne-sur-Mer-2 =

Coordinates: 50.72°N 1.61°E

The canton of Boulogne-sur-Mer-2 is an administrative division of the Pas-de-Calais department, in northern France. It was created at the French canton reorganisation which came into effect in March 2015. Its seat is in Boulogne-sur-Mer.

It consists of the following communes:

1. Baincthun
2. Boulogne-sur-Mer (partly)
3. Echinghen
4. Le Portel
5. Saint-Martin-Boulogne
