= Hesdin-l'Abbé =

- Commune
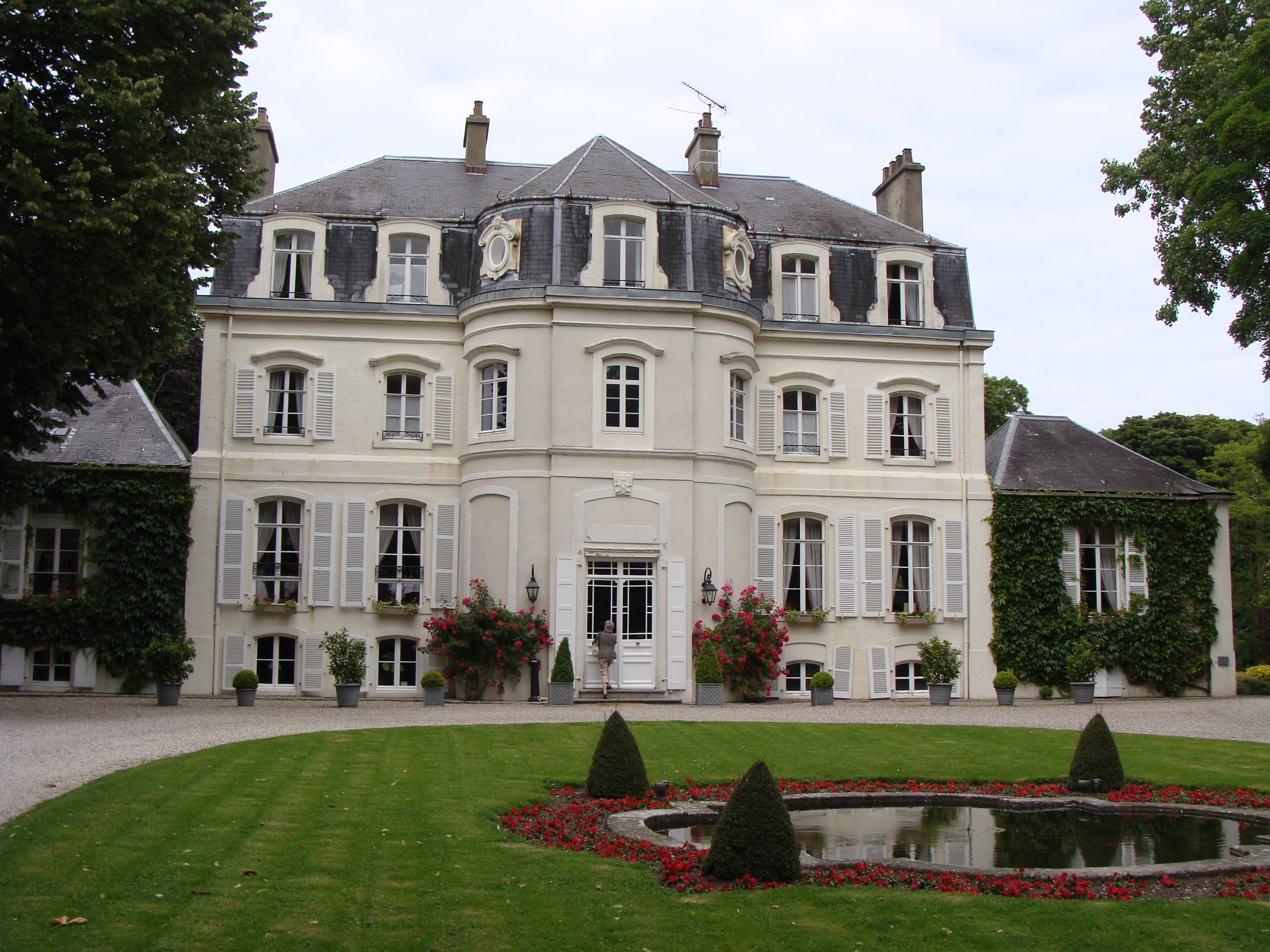
- The chateau of Cléry, in Hesdin-l'Abbé

- Coat of arms
- Location of Hesdin-l'Abbé
- Location within France Location within Hauts-de-France
- Coordinates: 50°40′10″N 1°40′55″E
- Country: France
- Region: Hauts-de-France
- Department: Pas-de-Calais
- Arrondissement: Boulogne-sur-Mer
- Canton: Outreau
- Intercommunality: CA du Boulonnais

Government
  - Mayor (2020–2026): Thierry Bentz
- Area^{1}: 7.39 km^{2} (2.85 sq mi)
- Elevation: 11 m (36 ft)
- Highest elevation: 130 m (430 ft)
- Lowest elevation: 7 m (23 ft)
- Population (2023): 1,891
  - Density: 256/km^{2} (663/sq mi)
- Time zone: UTC+01:00 (CET)
  - Summer (DST): UTC+02:00 (CEST)
- INSEE/Postal code: 62448 /62360
- ^{1} French Land Register data, which excludes lakes, ponds, glaciers > 1 km^{2} (0.386 sq mi or 247 acres) and river estuaries.

Hesdin-l'Abbé (French pronunciation: [edɛ̃ labe]) is a commune in the Pas-de-Calais department in the Hauts-de-France region of France.

== Geography ==
A forestry and farming village situated some 5 miles (8.0 km) south of Boulogne, at the junction of the D901 (formerly the N1 Paris-Calais highway) and theD240 road. The A16 autoroute forms part of the western border of the commune and the river Liane the southern.

== Population ==
Historical population
Year	Pop.	±% p.a.
1968	789	—
1975	831	+0.74%
1982	1,396	+7.69%
1990	1,880	+3.79%
1999	1,998	+0.68%
2007	1,903	−0.61%
2012	1,884	−0.20%
2017	1,863	−0.22%
2023	1,891	+0.25%
Source: INSEE

== Places of interest ==
- The church of St.Leger, dating from the seventeenth century.
- The eighteenth-century chateau d'Hesdin-l'Abbé, nowadays the Hotel Cléry.
- A seventeenth-century manorhouse.

== See also ==
- Communes of the Pas-de-Calais department
