= Dannes =

- Commune
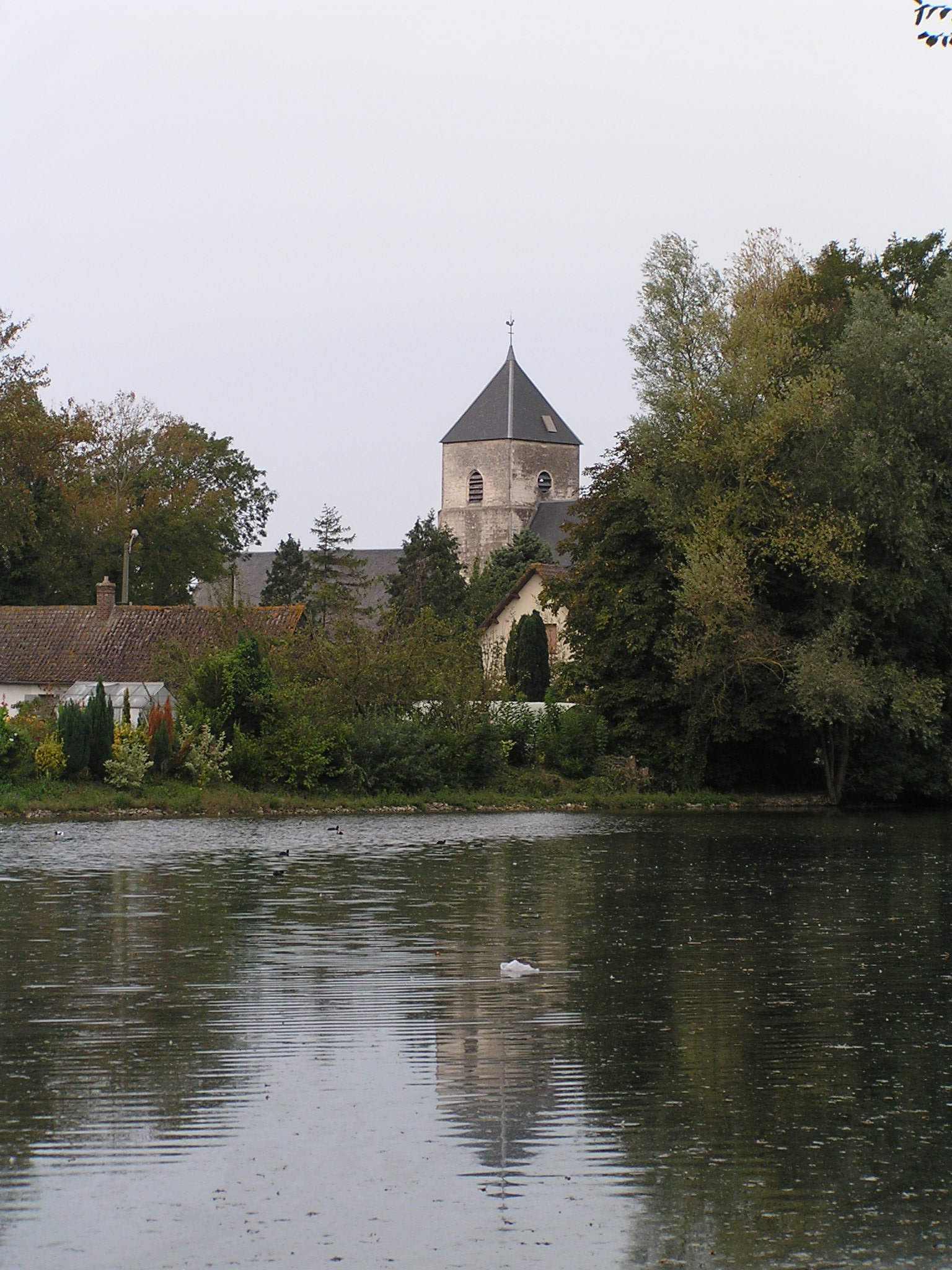
- The church of Dannes

- Coat of arms
- Location of Dannes
- Location within France Location within Hauts-de-France
- Coordinates: 50°35′24″N 1°36′53″E
- Country: France
- Region: Hauts-de-France
- Department: Pas-de-Calais
- Arrondissement: Boulogne-sur-Mer
- Canton: Outreau
- Intercommunality: CA du Boulonnais

Government
  - Mayor (2020–2026): Olivier Carton
- Area^{1}: 10.23 km^{2} (3.95 sq mi)
- Elevation: 30 m (98 ft)
- Highest elevation: 160 m (520 ft)
- Lowest elevation: 4 m (13 ft)
- Population (2023): 1,311
  - Density: 128.2/km^{2} (331.9/sq mi)
- Time zone: UTC+01:00 (CET)
  - Summer (DST): UTC+02:00 (CEST)
- INSEE/Postal code: 62264 /62187
- ^{1} French Land Register data, which excludes lakes, ponds, glaciers > 1 km^{2} (0.386 sq mi or 247 acres) and river estuaries.

Dannes (French pronunciation: [dan]) is a commune in the Pas-de-Calais department in the Hauts-de-France region of France about 13 kilometres (8.1 mi) south of Boulogne on the shore of the English Channel.

== Population ==
Historical population
Year	Pop.	±% p.a.
1968	1,391	—
1975	1,469	+0.78%
1982	1,353	−1.17%
1990	1,301	−0.49%
1999	1,258	−0.37%
2007	1,305	+0.46%
2012	1,316	+0.17%
2017	1,316	+0.00%
2023	1,311	−0.06%
Source: INSEE

== See also ==
- Communes of the Pas-de-Calais department
