= Saint-Léonard, Pas-de-Calais =

Saint-Léonard Hokinghem
- Commune
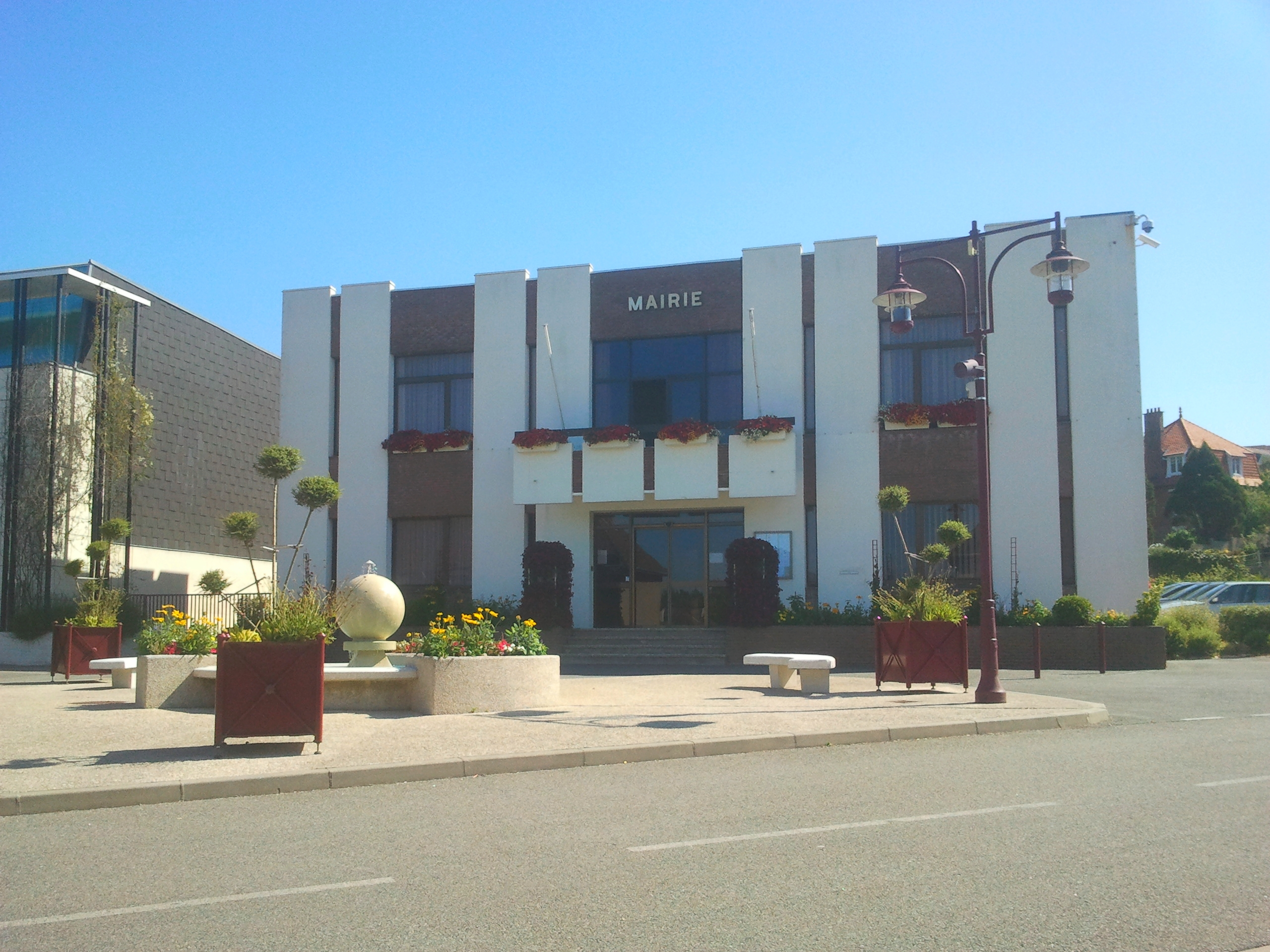
- The town hall of Saint-Léonard

- Coat of arms
- Location of Saint-Léonard
- Location within France Location within Hauts-de-France
- Coordinates: 50°41′28″N 1°37′31″E
- Country: France
- Region: Hauts-de-France
- Department: Pas-de-Calais
- Arrondissement: Boulogne-sur-Mer
- Canton: Outreau
- Intercommunality: CA du Boulonnais

Government
  - Mayor (2020–2026): Gwénaëlle Loire
- Area^{1}: 3.4 km^{2} (1.3 sq mi)
- Elevation: 7 m (23 ft)
- Highest elevation: 110 m (360 ft)
- Lowest elevation: 2 m (6.6 ft)
- Population (2023): 3,353
  - Density: 990/km^{2} (2,600/sq mi)
- Time zone: UTC+01:00 (CET)
  - Summer (DST): UTC+02:00 (CEST)
- INSEE/Postal code: 62755 /62360
- ^{1} French Land Register data, which excludes lakes, ponds, glaciers > 1 km^{2} (0.386 sq mi or 247 acres) and river estuaries.

Saint-Léonard (French pronunciation: [sɛ̃ leɔnaʁ]; West Flemish: Hokinghem) is a commune in the Pas-de-Calais department in the Hauts-de-France region of France about 2 miles (3.2 km) south of Boulogne. The western border of the commune is the river Liane.

== Population ==
Historical population
Year	Pop.	±% p.a.
1968	1,547	—
1975	3,929	+14.24%
1982	4,021	+0.33%
1990	4,131	+0.34%
1999	3,952	−0.49%
2007	3,628	−1.06%
2012	3,616	−0.07%
2017	3,452	−0.92%
2023	3,353	−0.48%
Source: INSEE

== Places of interest ==
- The church of St.Léonard, dating from the twelfth century and now a historical monument.
- The Château de Pont-de-Briques, (dating from the seventeenth century), a registered monument.
- The nineteenth century Château Neuf.
- Château des Lions (also known as Château Muhlberg), a château from the nineteenth century, now an orphanage

== See also ==
- Communes of the Pas-de-Calais department
