= Canton of Outreau =

Coordinates: 50°41′31″N 1°34′55″E

Outreau
- Canton
- Location of Outreau within the department
- Country: France
- Region: Hauts-de-France
- Department: Pas-de-Calais
- No. of communes: {{{nbcomm}}}
- Area: 98.42 km^{2} (38.00 sq mi)
- Population (2023): 36,969
  - Density: 375.6/km^{2} (972.9/sq mi)
- INSEE code: 62 36

The canton of Outreau is a canton situated in the department of the Pas-de-Calais and in the Hauts-de-France region of northern France.

== Geography ==
The canton is organised around Outreau in the arrondissement of Boulogne-sur-Mer. The elevation varies from 0m to 96m at Équihen-Plage for an average elevation of 55m.

== Population ==
Historical population
Year	Pop.	±% p.a.
2013	38,207	—
2018	37,066	−0.60%
Source: INSEE

== Composition ==
At the French canton reorganisation which came into effect in March 2015, the canton was expanded from 2 to 11 communes:

- Condette
- Dannes
- Équihen-Plage
- Hesdigneul-lès-Boulogne
- Hesdin-l'Abbé
- Isques
- Nesles
- Neufchâtel-Hardelot
- Outreau
- Saint-Étienne-au-Mont
- Saint-Léonard

== See also ==
- Cantons of Pas-de-Calais
- Communes of Pas-de-Calais
- Arrondissements of the Pas-de-Calais department
