= Heurt Fort =

Fort in France

Coordinates: 50°42′29″N 1°33′35″E

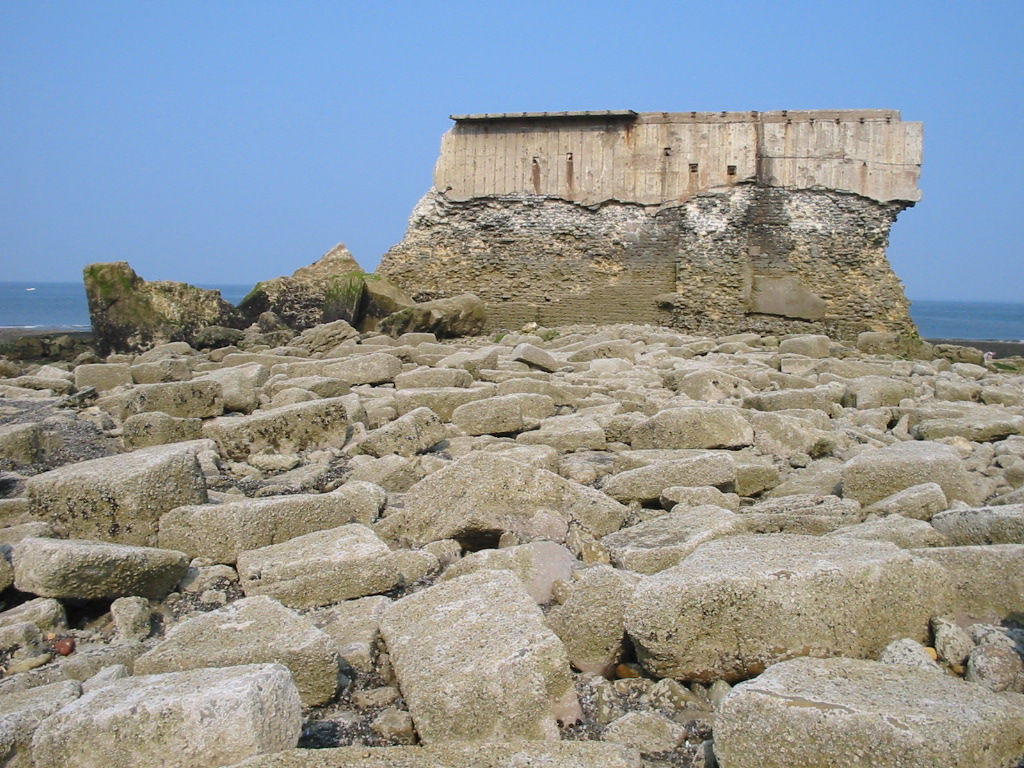
View of the fort of l'Heurt

The Fort de l'Heurt is a fort near Boulogne-sur-Mer in northern France. It was built by order of Napoleon Bonaparte on the remains of the ancient promontory Icius Ptolemy (by the sea facing the town of le Portel) after the breaking of the Treaty of Amiens by the British in May 1803. This mass of rocks that once formed a small island near Equihen went, according to a former British map, by the name of Heustrière (which means Oyster Island). That name would have become, over time, first Heustre then Heurt.

Work on the fort, directed by Captain of Engineers of Gouville, began 24 May 1803. The plans were signed by the Director of the fortifications Guillaume Dode of Brunerie who would become a Marshal under Louis Philippe I.

During construction, a second fort, a copy of the Fort de l'Heurt, was also built at Wimereux. It was called the Fort de la Crèche. Napoleon's letters often talk on the work of advancing the "forts of l'Heurt and of the Crèche." Of the latter there is nothing left, except the foundations are visible in some places to the discerning eye. The Fort de la Crèche resisted very bad storms because on the drawings of Mr. Vaillant (in the Boulogne Library) they show that in 1870 it was already almost irreparable, while on other sketches by the same painter dating from 1870, Fort de l'Heurt appears whole and undamaged.

Another fort is also called Fort of the Crèche and dates from the 1870s. An association has restored it gradually to its original appearance.

After much damage due to storms and relentless attacks of the British, the fort was finally operational on 16 July 1804. It was then intended to protect the southern anchorage of the fleet at the fr:Camp de Boulogne; its twin fort was at the Pointe de la Creche.

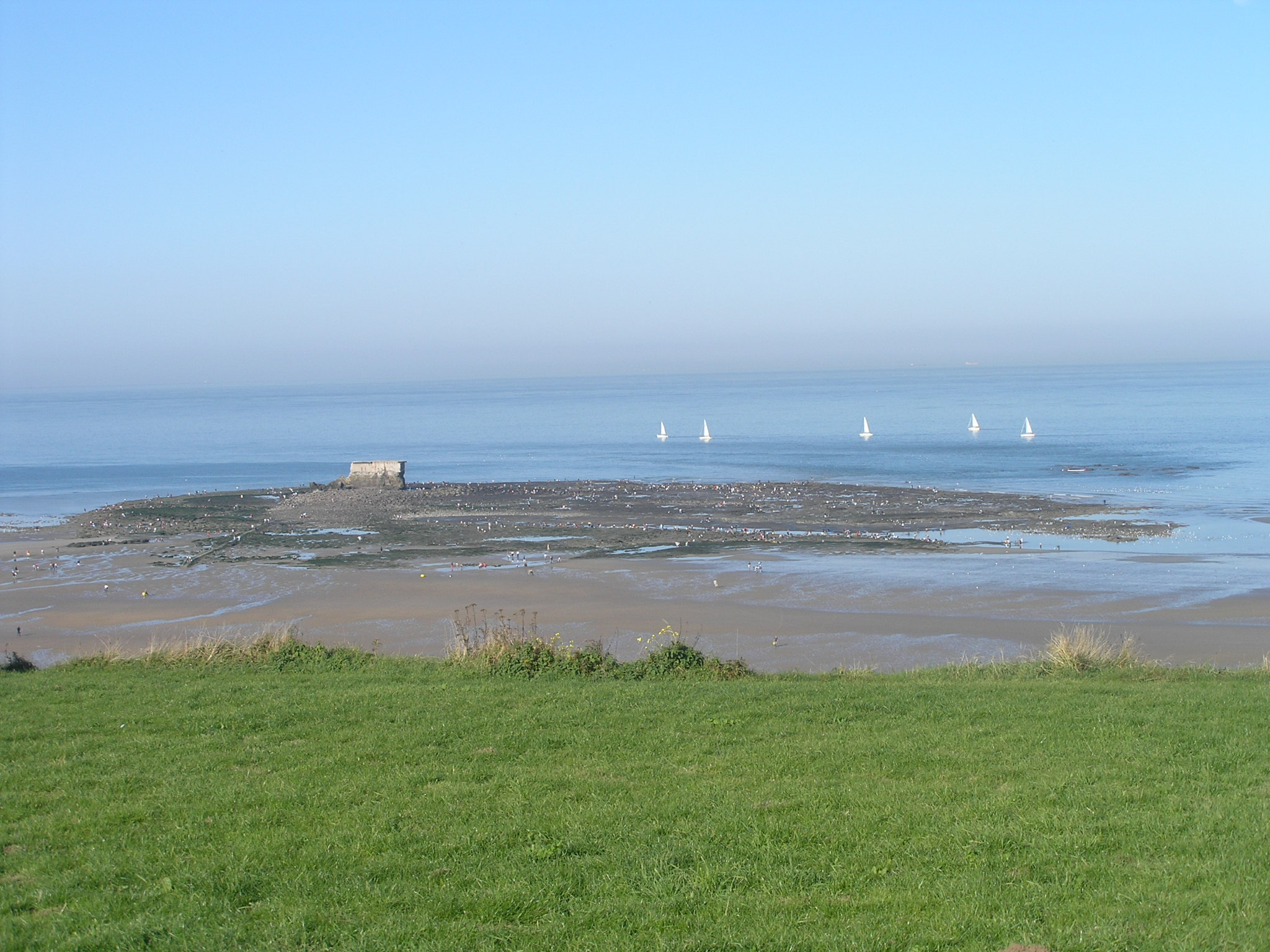
The Fort of l'Heurt, sea moorings

The outer shell of the fort is made of hewn stone from the quarries of Ainghem and of Wimille, blocks of a size of 1.90m × 1.30m × 0.40m. The stones that still exist today are masonry rubble bound with mortar cement or lime.

You can get into the inside of the fort through a door with the aid of a ladder and then to the upper platform by a circular staircase that one finds in the tower.

The deck was 41 feet (13.50m) high over rocks and covered 175m^{2}; it formed a semicircle of a development 150m around which were lined up behind a parapet, 12 36-inch guns and 4 6-inch long-range howitzers. In the center of the platform were three mortars of 12 inches.

During the Second World War the Germans placed there a concrete slab in order to install an anti aircraft battery (DCA). This would effectively consolidate all of the ruins of the bastion and preserve it until today. However, a big storm in November 1998 caused the collapse of part of the work. Since 1977 an association (ASFHPP) has been fighting for the forts preservation including a consolidation project whose study is conducted by Philippe Prost Architect specializing in monuments at sea.

== See also ==
- List of forts, fortifications, citadels and fortresses in France
