= Outreau =

Outreau Outriauwe (Picard) Wabingen (West Flemish)
- Commune
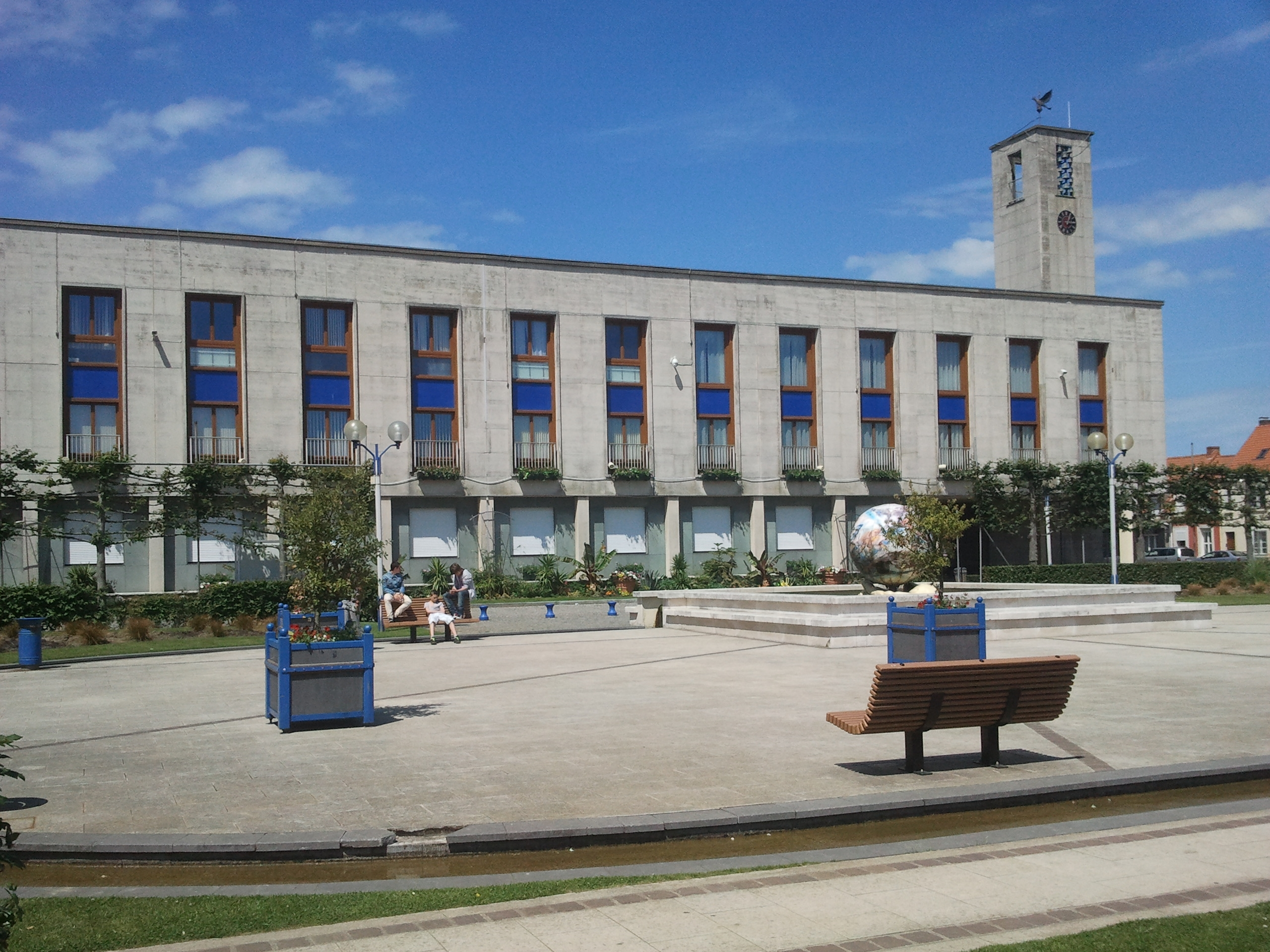
- The town hall of Outreau

- Coat of arms
- Location of Outreau
- Location within France Location within Hauts-de-France
- Coordinates: 50°42′16″N 1°35′41″E
- Country: France
- Region: Hauts-de-France
- Department: Pas-de-Calais
- Arrondissement: Boulogne-sur-Mer
- Canton: Outreau
- Intercommunality: CA du Boulonnais

Government
  - Mayor (2020–2026): Sébastien Chochois
- Area^{1}: 7.09 km^{2} (2.74 sq mi)
- Elevation: 55 m (180 ft)
- Highest elevation: 96 m (315 ft)
- Lowest elevation: 2 m (6.6 ft)
- Population (2023): 13,138
  - Density: 1,850/km^{2} (4,800/sq mi)
- Time zone: UTC+01:00 (CET)
  - Summer (DST): UTC+02:00 (CEST)
- INSEE/Postal code: 62643 /62230
- ^{1} French Land Register data, which excludes lakes, ponds, glaciers > 1 km^{2} (0.386 sq mi or 247 acres) and river estuaries.

Outreau (French pronunciation: [utʁo]; Picard: Outriauwe; West Flemish: Wabingen) is a commune in the Pas-de-Calais department in the Hauts-de-France region of France west of Boulogne. The river Liane forms the eastern border of the commune with Boulogne.

== History ==
Outreau was the site of the Outreau trials of 2001–2004.

== Population ==
Historical population
Year	Pop.	±% p.a.
1968	13,735	—
1975	14,731	+1.01%
1982	14,590	−0.14%
1990	15,279	+0.58%
1999	15,222	−0.04%
2007	14,307	−0.77%
2012	14,519	+0.29%
2017	13,422	−1.56%
2023	13,138	−0.36%
Source: INSEE

== Twin towns ==
- Eppelborn, Germany.

== See also ==
- Communes of the Pas-de-Calais department
