= Isques =

Isques Izeke
- Commune
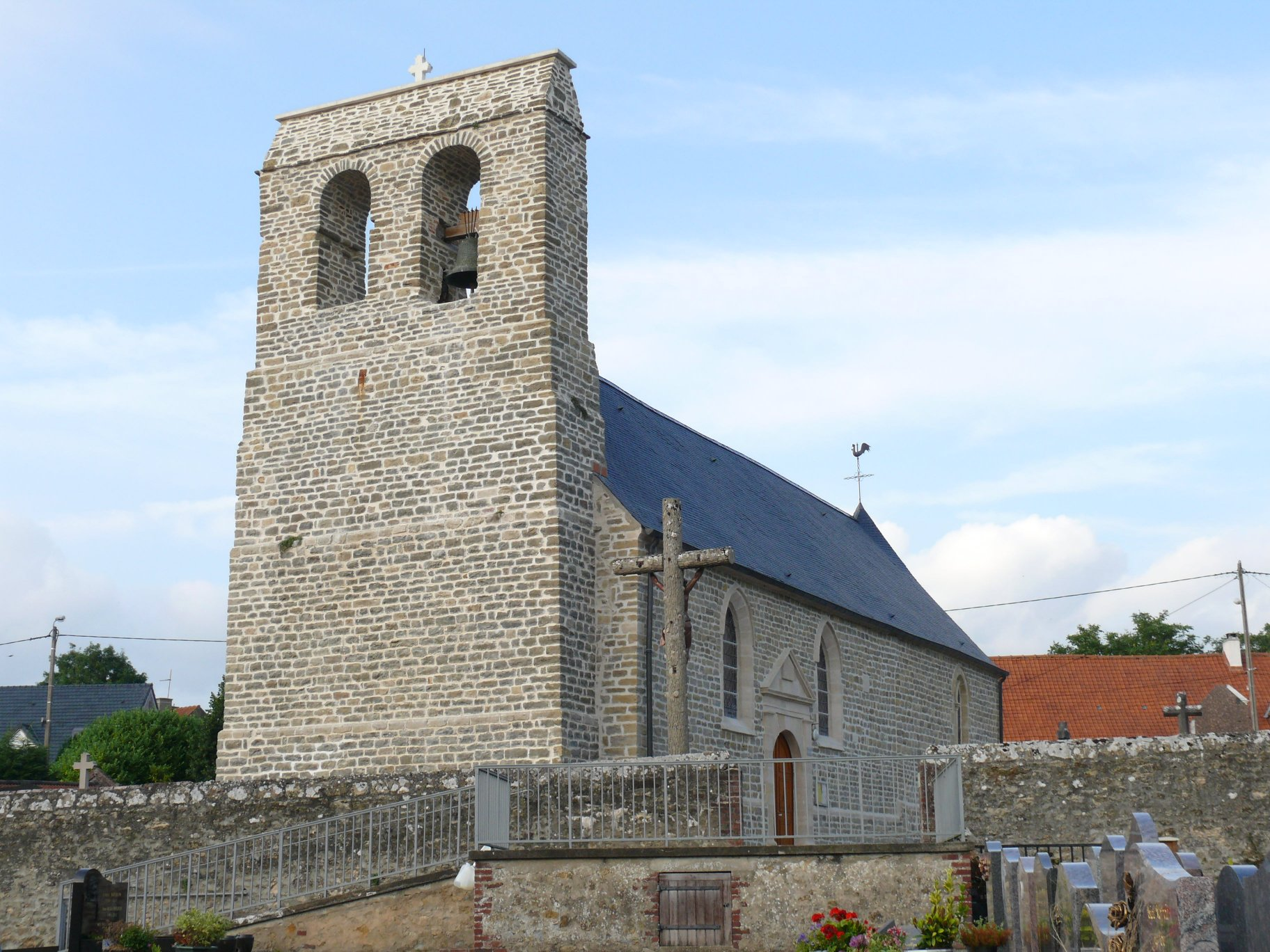
- The church of Isques

- Coat of arms
- Location of Isques
- Location within France Location within Hauts-de-France
- Coordinates: 50°40′36″N 1°39′03″E
- Country: France
- Region: Hauts-de-France
- Department: Pas-de-Calais
- Arrondissement: Boulogne-sur-Mer
- Canton: Outreau
- Intercommunality: CA du Boulonnais

Government
  - Mayor (2020–2026): Bertrand Dumaine
- Area^{1}: 6.98 km^{2} (2.69 sq mi)
- Elevation: 9 m (30 ft)
- Highest elevation: 154 m (505 ft)
- Lowest elevation: 4 m (13 ft)
- Population (2023): 1,122
  - Density: 161/km^{2} (416/sq mi)
- Time zone: UTC+01:00 (CET)
  - Summer (DST): UTC+02:00 (CEST)
- INSEE/Postal code: 62474 /62360
- ^{1} French Land Register data, which excludes lakes, ponds, glaciers > 1 km^{2} (0.386 sq mi or 247 acres) and river estuaries.

Isques (French pronunciation: [isk]; Dutch: Izeke) is a commune in the Pas-de-Calais department in the Hauts-de-France region of France about 4 miles (6.4 km) south of Boulogne. The river Liane flows through the commune.

== Population ==
Historical population
Year	Pop.	±% p.a.
1968	745	—
1975	736	−0.17%
1982	960	+3.87%
1990	1,171	+2.51%
1999	1,102	−0.67%
2007	1,151	+0.55%
2012	1,142	−0.16%
2017	1,153	+0.19%
2023	1,122	−0.45%
Source: INSEE

== See also ==
- Communes of the Pas-de-Calais department
