= Nesles =

- Commune
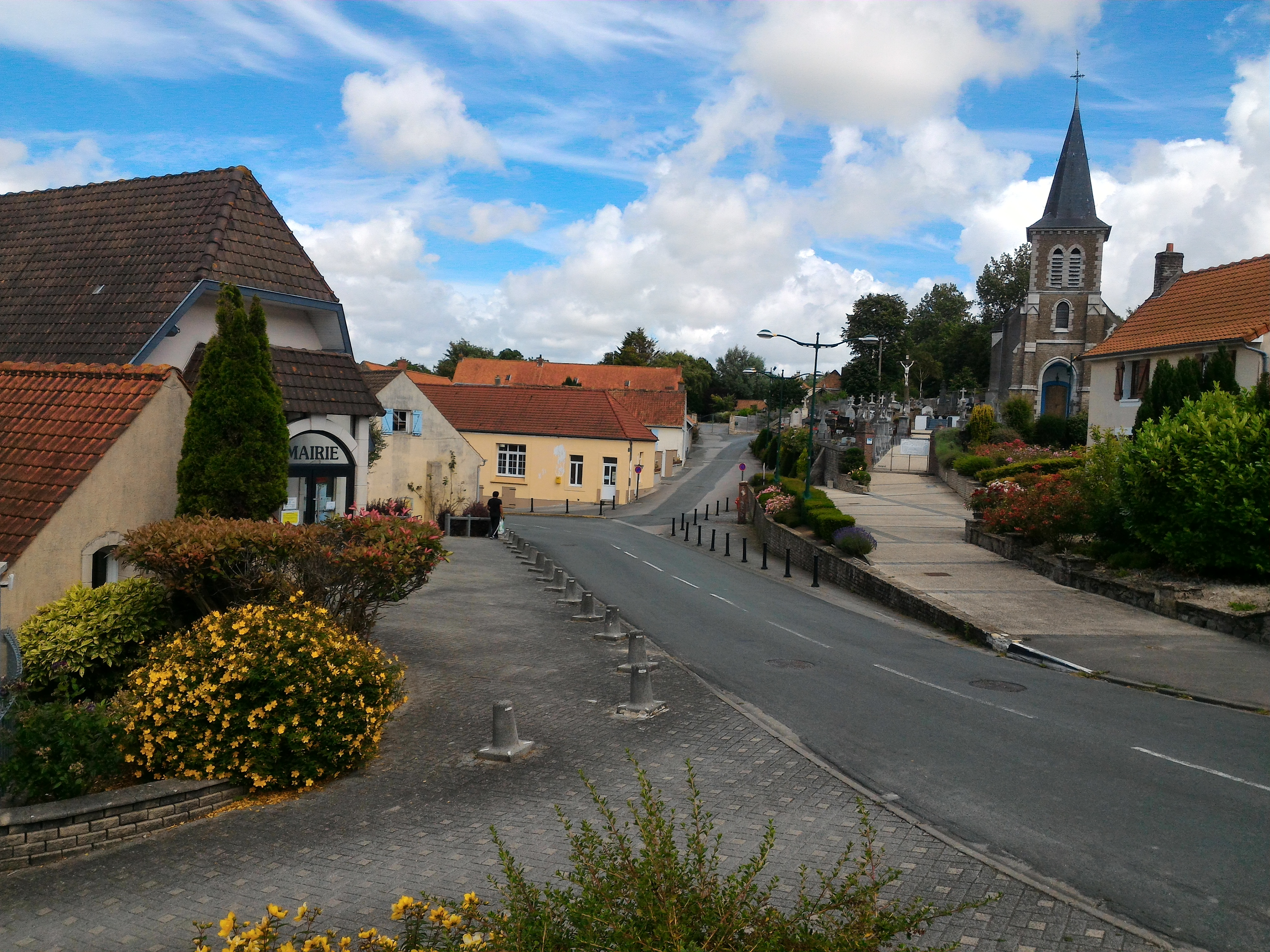
- The town hall and church of Nesles

- Coat of arms
- Location of Nesles
- Location within France Location within Hauts-de-France
- Coordinates: 50°37′41″N 1°39′26″E
- Country: France
- Region: Hauts-de-France
- Department: Pas-de-Calais
- Arrondissement: Boulogne-sur-Mer
- Canton: Outreau
- Intercommunality: CA du Boulonnais

Government
  - Mayor (2020–2026): Guy Feutry
- Area^{1}: 5.04 km^{2} (1.95 sq mi)
- Elevation: 38 m (125 ft)
- Highest elevation: 177 m (581 ft)
- Lowest elevation: 21 m (69 ft)
- Population (2023): 1,095
  - Density: 217/km^{2} (563/sq mi)
- Time zone: UTC+01:00 (CET)
  - Summer (DST): UTC+02:00 (CEST)
- INSEE/Postal code: 62603 /62152
- ^{1} French Land Register data, which excludes lakes, ponds, glaciers > 1 km^{2} (0.386 sq mi or 247 acres) and river estuaries.

Nesles (French pronunciation: [nɛl]) is a commune in the Pas-de-Calais department in the Hauts-de-France region of France about 12 miles (19 km) south of Boulogne.

== Population ==
Historical population
Year	Pop.	±% p.a.
1968	1,114	—
1975	977	−1.86%
1982	1,039	+0.88%
1990	1,097	+0.68%
1999	1,067	−0.31%
2007	1,047	−0.24%
2012	923	−2.49%
2017	953	+0.64%
2023	1,095	+2.34%
Source: INSEE

== See also ==
- Communes of the Pas-de-Calais department
