= Saint-Étienne-au-Mont =

Saint-Étienne-au-Mont Sint-Stevens Bergen
- Commune
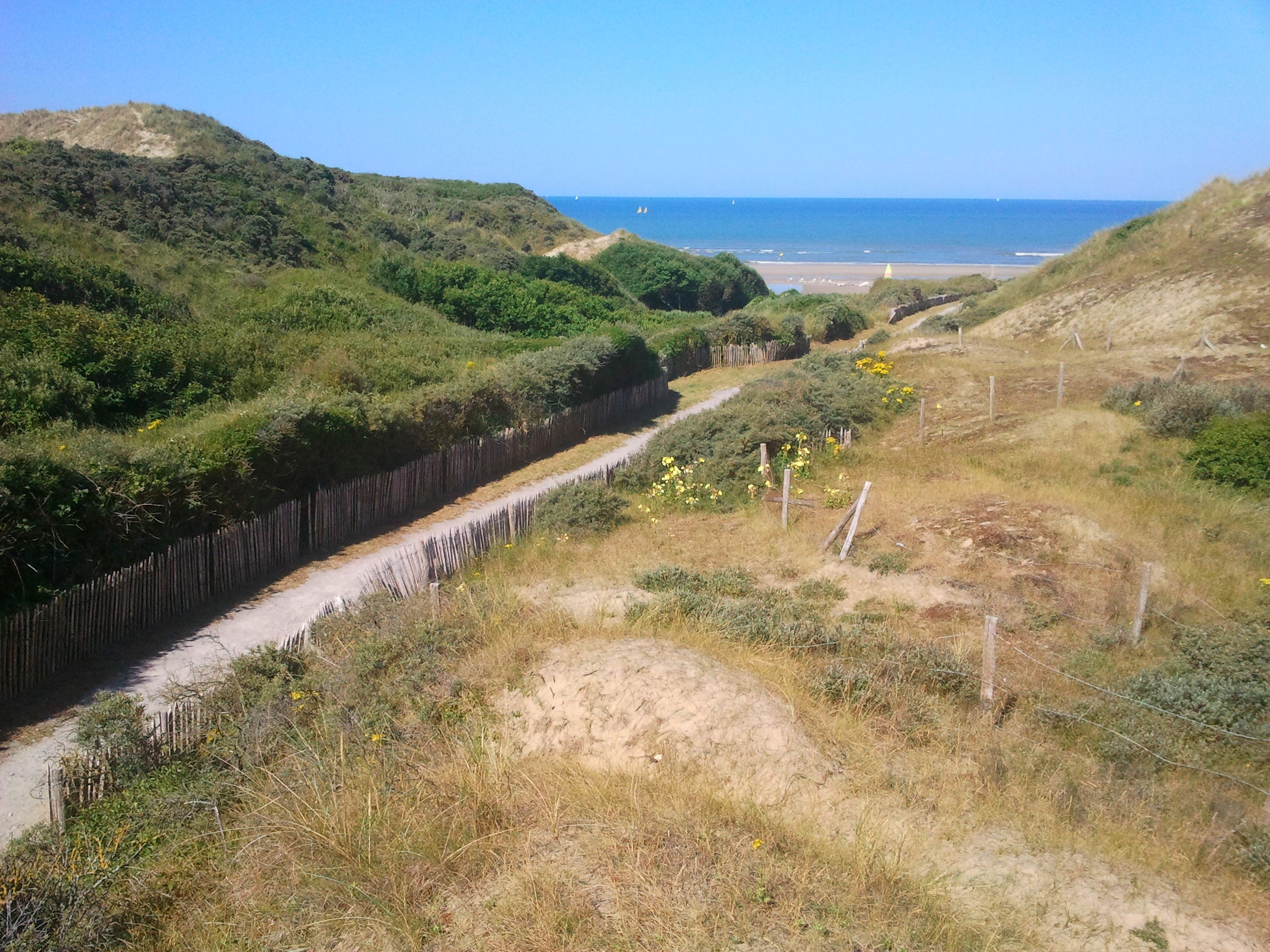
- The route to Ecault beach

- Coat of arms
- Location of Saint-Étienne-au-Mont
- Location within France Location within Hauts-de-France
- Coordinates: 50°40′56″N 1°37′37″E
- Country: France
- Region: Hauts-de-France
- Department: Pas-de-Calais
- Arrondissement: Boulogne-sur-Mer
- Canton: Outreau
- Intercommunality: CA Boulonnais

Government
  - Mayor (2020–2026): Brigitte Passebosc
- Area^{1}: 14.05 km^{2} (5.42 sq mi)
- Elevation: 7 m (23 ft)
- Highest elevation: 113 m (371 ft)
- Lowest elevation: 3 m (9.8 ft)
- Population (2023): 5,029
  - Density: 357.9/km^{2} (927.0/sq mi)
- Time zone: UTC+01:00 (CET)
  - Summer (DST): UTC+02:00 (CEST)
- INSEE/Postal code: 62746 /62360
- ^{1} French Land Register data, which excludes lakes, ponds, glaciers > 1 km^{2} (0.386 sq mi or 247 acres) and river estuaries.

Saint-Étienne-au-Mont (French pronunciation: [sɛ̃t‿etjɛn o mɔ̃]; Picard: Sant-Étienne-au-Mont; obsolete Dutch: Sint-Stevensbergen, lit. 'St. Stephen's Mountains') is a commune in the Pas-de-Calais department in the Hauts-de-France region of France near Boulogne-sur-Mer.

== Geography ==
Saint-Étienne-au-Mont is about 3 miles (4.8 km) south of Boulogne. The river Liane flows from the north of the commune to the south-east. West of Écault is the English Channel.

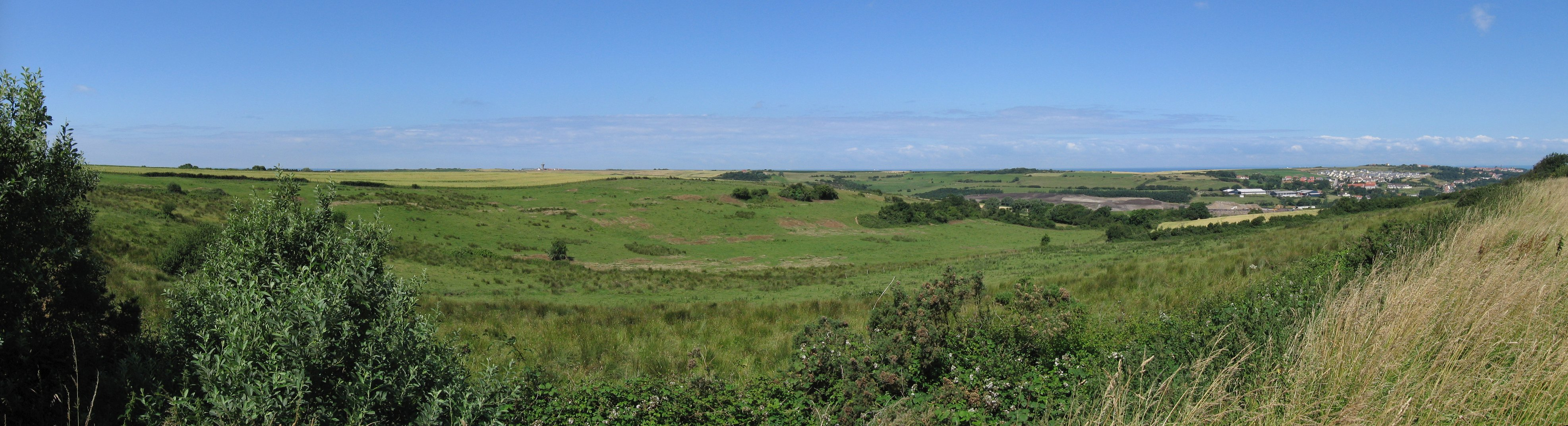
Panorama from Mt Ecault with the English Channel.

== Population ==
Historical population
Year	Pop.	±% p.a.
1968	4,389	—
1975	4,301	−0.29%
1982	4,632	+1.06%
1990	5,037	+1.05%
1999	4,995	−0.09%
2007	5,068	+0.18%
2012	5,097	+0.11%
2017	5,076	−0.08%
2023	5,029	−0.15%
Source: INSEE

== Places of interest ==
- The church of Sainte-Thérèse, a nineteenth century church.
- The St. Etienne-au-Mont Communal Cemetery (including the Commonwealth War Graves Commission cemetery) created during World War I for men of the Chinese Labour Corps and of the South African Native Labour Corps.
- The Château d'Audisque, dating from the eighteenth century and a registered monument.

== See also ==
- Communes of the Pas-de-Calais department
- Chinese Labour Corps
