= Conteville-lès-Boulogne =

Conteville-lès-Boulogne ’s-Gravenhoeve
- Commune
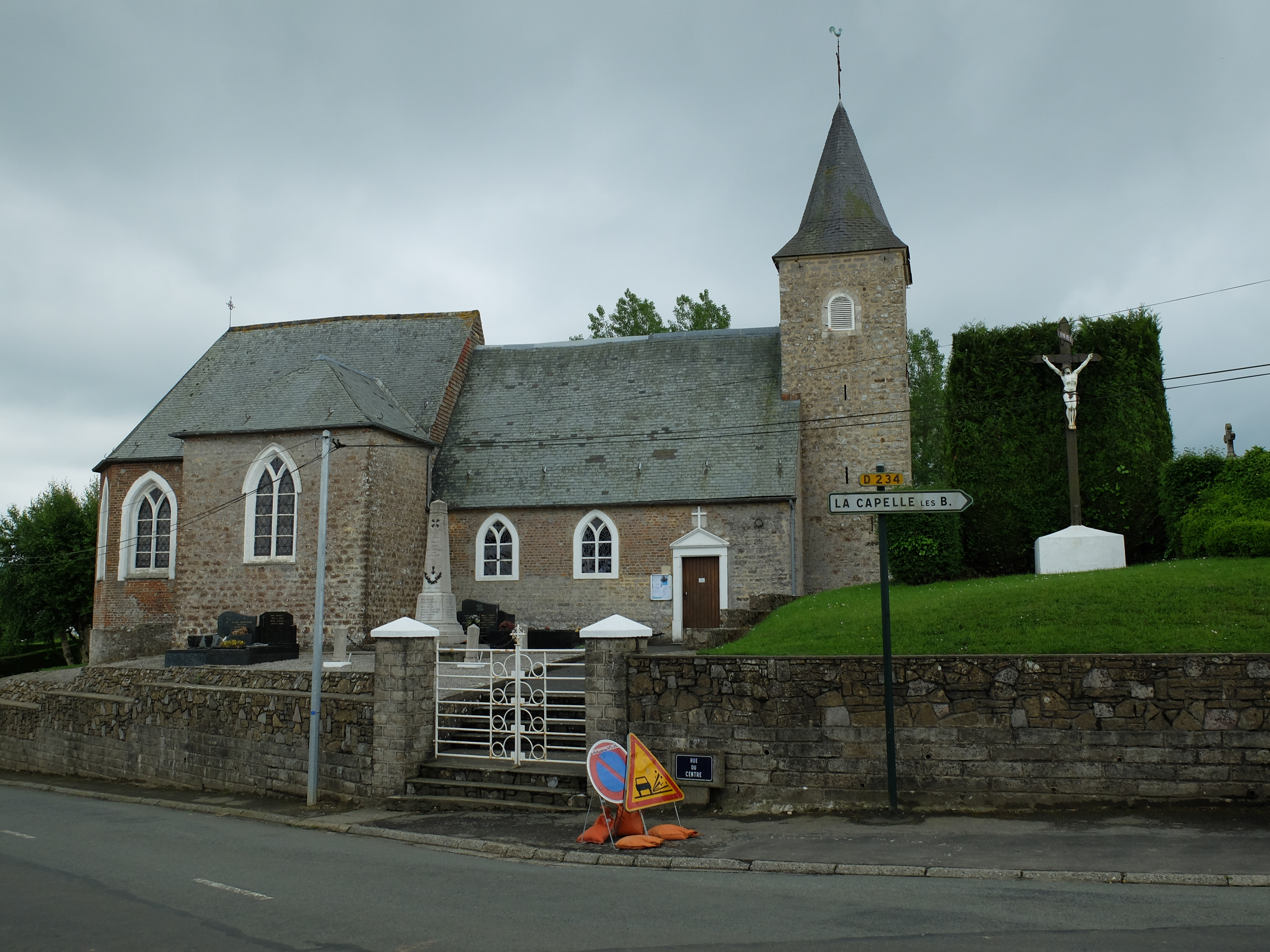
- The church of Conteville-lès-Boulogne

- Coat of arms
- Location of Conteville-lès-Boulogne
- Location within France Location within Hauts-de-France
- Coordinates: 50°44′44″N 1°43′57″E
- Country: France
- Region: Hauts-de-France
- Department: Pas-de-Calais
- Arrondissement: Boulogne-sur-Mer
- Canton: Boulogne-sur-Mer-1
- Intercommunality: CA du Boulonnais

Government
  - Mayor (2020–2026): Jean-Renaud Taubregeas
- Area^{1}: 2.1 km^{2} (0.81 sq mi)
- Elevation: 36 m (118 ft)
- Highest elevation: 106 m (348 ft)
- Lowest elevation: 25 m (82 ft)
- Population (2023): 572
  - Density: 270/km^{2} (710/sq mi)
- Time zone: UTC+01:00 (CET)
  - Summer (DST): UTC+02:00 (CEST)
- INSEE/Postal code: 62237 /62126
- ^{1} French Land Register data, which excludes lakes, ponds, glaciers > 1 km^{2} (0.386 sq mi or 247 acres) and river estuaries.

Conteville-lès-Boulogne (French pronunciation: [kɔ̃tvil lɛ bulɔɲ], literally Conteville near Boulogne; West Flemish: ’s-Gravenhoeve) is a commune in the Pas-de-Calais department in the Hauts-de-France region of France.

== Geography ==
A farming and forestry village, some 6 miles (9.7 km) northeast of Boulogne, at the junction of the D234 and the D233 roads. The huge 4,000 hectares (9,900 acres) forest of Boulogne forms the southernmost borders of the commune.

== Population ==
Historical population
Year	Pop.	±% p.a.
1968	223	—
1975	206	−1.13%
1982	257	+3.21%
1990	437	+6.86%
1999	441	+0.10%
2007	434	−0.20%
2012	491	+2.50%
2017	478	−0.54%
2023	572	+3.04%
Source: INSEE

== Transport ==
The Chemin de fer de Boulogne à Bonningues (CF de BB) opened a station at Conteville-lès-Boulogne on 22 April 1900. Passenger services were withdrawn on 31 December 1935. They were reinstated in November 1942. The CF de BB closed in 1948.

== Places of interest ==
- The church of St. Marie-Madeleine, dating from the sixteenth century.
- The eighteenth century chapel of Saint-Hubert.
- The seventeenth century manorhouse de la Motte.
- Remains of an old castle.

== See also ==
- Communes of the Pas-de-Calais department
