= Canton of Boulogne-sur-Mer-1 =

Coordinates: 50.73°N 1.60°E

The canton of Boulogne-sur-Mer-1 is an administrative division of the Pas-de-Calais department, in northern France. It was created at the French canton reorganisation which came into effect in March 2015. Its seat is in Boulogne-sur-Mer.

It consists of the following communes:

1. Boulogne-sur-Mer (partly)
2. La Capelle-lès-Boulogne
3. Conteville-lès-Boulogne
4. Pernes-lès-Boulogne
5. Pittefaux
6. Wimereux
7. Wimille
