= Echinghen =

Echinghen Essingem
- Commune
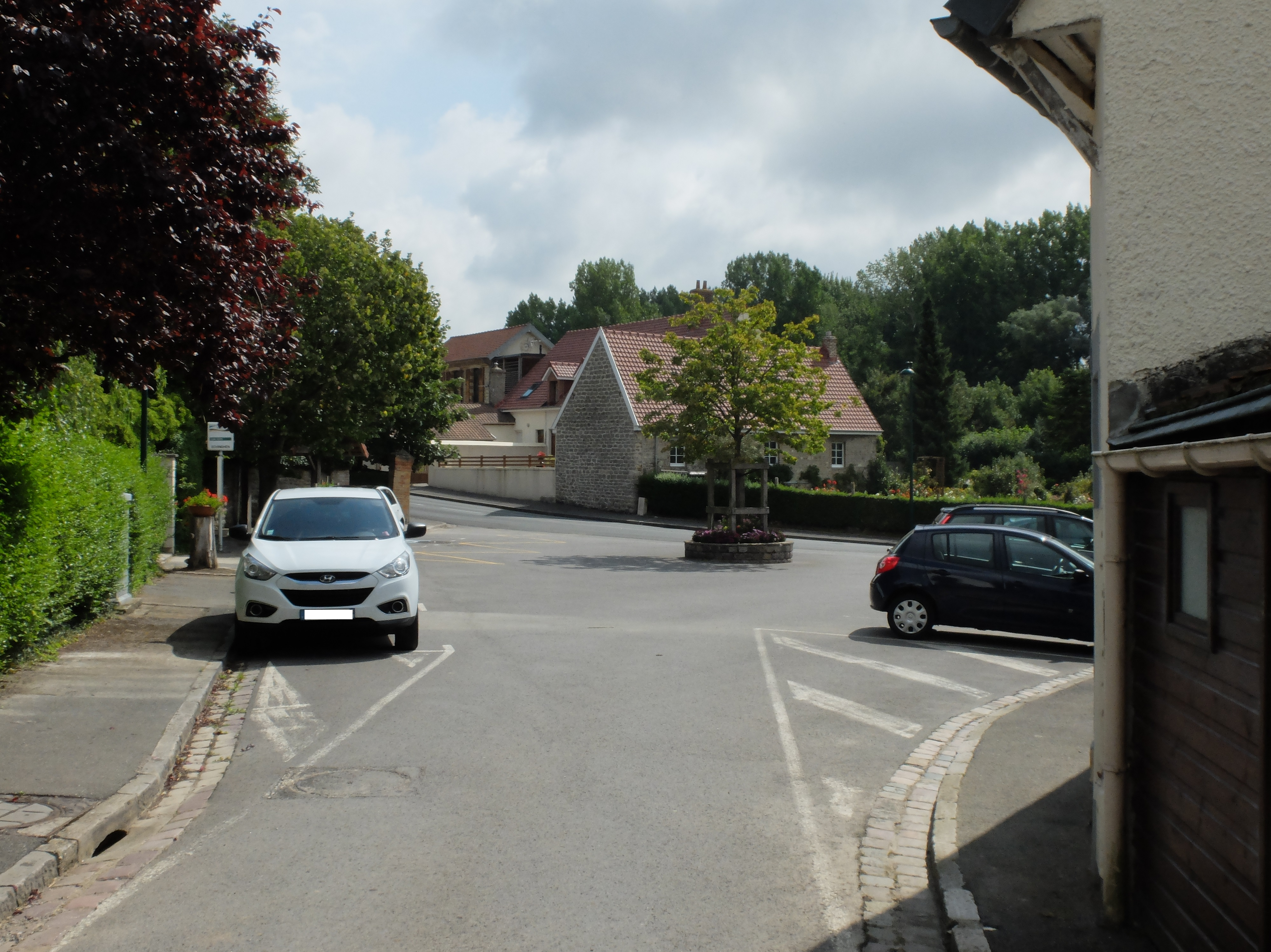
- The centre of Echinghen

- Coat of arms
- Location of Echinghen
- Location within France Location within Hauts-de-France
- Coordinates: 50°42′14″N 1°38′56″E
- Country: France
- Region: Hauts-de-France
- Department: Pas-de-Calais
- Arrondissement: Boulogne-sur-Mer
- Canton: Boulogne-sur-Mer-2
- Intercommunality: CA du Boulonnais

Government
  - Mayor (2020–2026): Jacques Lannoy
- Area^{1}: 5.84 km^{2} (2.25 sq mi)
- Elevation: 30 m (98 ft)
- Highest elevation: 144 m (472 ft)
- Lowest elevation: 11 m (36 ft)
- Population (2023): 378
  - Density: 64.7/km^{2} (168/sq mi)
- Time zone: UTC+01:00 (CET)
  - Summer (DST): UTC+02:00 (CEST)
- INSEE/Postal code: 62281 /62360
- ^{1} French Land Register data, which excludes lakes, ponds, glaciers > 1 km^{2} (0.386 sq mi or 247 acres) and river estuaries.

Echinghen (French pronunciation: [eʃɛ̃ɡɑ̃]; West Flemish: Essingem) is a commune in the Pas-de-Calais department in the Hauts-de-France region of France about 3 miles (4.8 km) southeast of Boulogne.

== Population ==
Historical population
Year	Pop.	±% p.a.
1968	218	—
1975	212	−0.40%
1982	235	+1.48%
1990	284	+2.40%
1999	355	+2.51%
2007	374	+0.65%
2012	371	−0.16%
2017	390	+1.00%
2023	378	−0.52%
Source: INSEE

== See also ==
- Communes of the Pas-de-Calais department
