= Saint-Martin-Boulogne =

Saint-Martin-Boulogne Sint-Maarten bij Bonen
- Commune
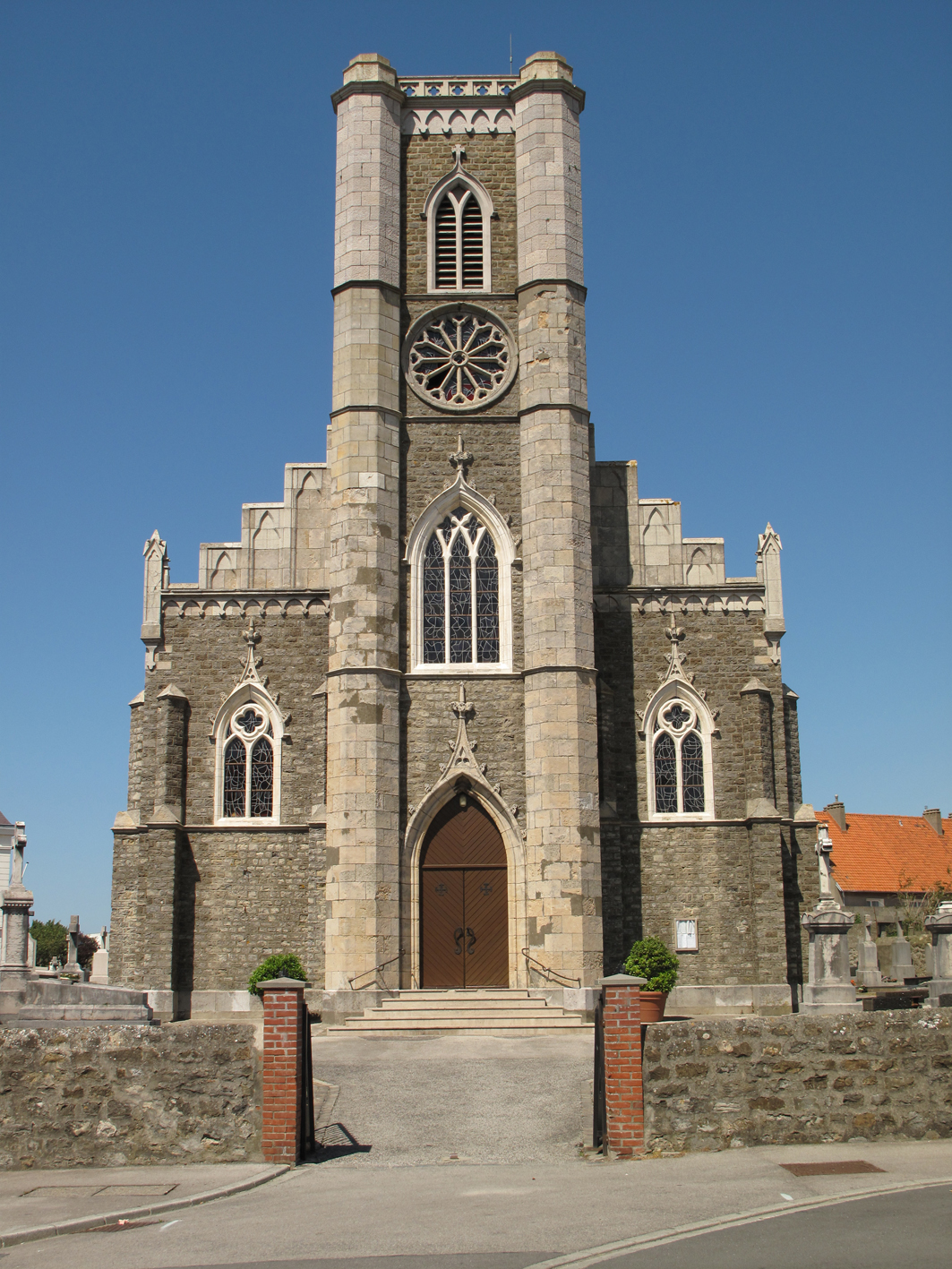
- The church of Saint-Martin-Boulogne

- Coat of arms
- Location of Saint-Martin-Boulogne
- Location within France Location within Hauts-de-France
- Coordinates: 50°43′36″N 1°37′58″E
- Country: France
- Region: Hauts-de-France
- Department: Pas-de-Calais
- Arrondissement: Boulogne-sur-Mer
- Canton: Boulogne-sur-Mer-2
- Intercommunality: CA du Boulonnais

Government
  - Mayor (2020–2026): Raphaël Jules
- Area^{1}: 13.15 km^{2} (5.08 sq mi)
- Elevation: 80 m (260 ft)
- Highest elevation: 188 m (617 ft)
- Lowest elevation: 3 m (9.8 ft)
- Population (2023): 10,888
  - Density: 828.0/km^{2} (2,144/sq mi)
- Time zone: UTC+01:00 (CET)
  - Summer (DST): UTC+02:00 (CEST)
- INSEE/Postal code: 62758 /62280
- ^{1} French Land Register data, which excludes lakes, ponds, glaciers > 1 km^{2} (0.386 sq mi or 247 acres) and river estuaries.

Saint-Martin-Boulogne (French pronunciation: [sɛ̃ maʁtɛ̃ bulɔɲ]; West Flemish: Sint-Maarten bij Bonen) is a commune in the Pas-de-Calais department in the Hauts-de-France region of France.

== Geography ==
Saint-Martin-Boulogne is a farming and light industrial suburb east of Boulogne itself, at the junction of the N42 and D96 roads. Junctions 30 and 31 of the A16 autoroute lie within the commune's borders.

== Population ==
Historical population
| Year | Pop. | ±% p.a. |
|---|---|---|
| 1968 | 12,020 | — |
| 1975 | 12,341 | +0.38% |
| 1982 | 11,271 | −1.29% |
| 1990 | 11,054 | −0.24% |
| 1999 | 11,499 | +0.44% |
| 2007 | 11,383 | −0.13% |
| 2012 | 11,168 | −0.38% |
| 2017 | 11,204 | +0.06% |
| 2023 | 10,888 | −0.48% |
Source: INSEE

== Transport ==
The Chemin de fer de Boulogne à Bonningues (CF de BB) opened a station at Saint-Martin-Boulogne on 22 April 1900. Passenger services were withdrawn on 31 December 1935. They were reinstated in November 1942. The CF de BB closed in 1948.

== Places of interest ==
- The church of St.Martin, dating from the eighteenth century.
- The modern church of Sts.Bernadette and Yde.
- The Château de La Caucherie, dating from the nineteenth century.
- The Château du Denacre, dating from the eighteenth century.
- Three 17th century farmhouses and manorhouses.
- A fifteenth century windmill and the ruins of a watermill.
- The Meerut Military Cemetery (Commonwealth War Graves Commission cemetery).

== See also ==
- Communes of the Pas-de-Calais department
