= Baincthun =

- Commune
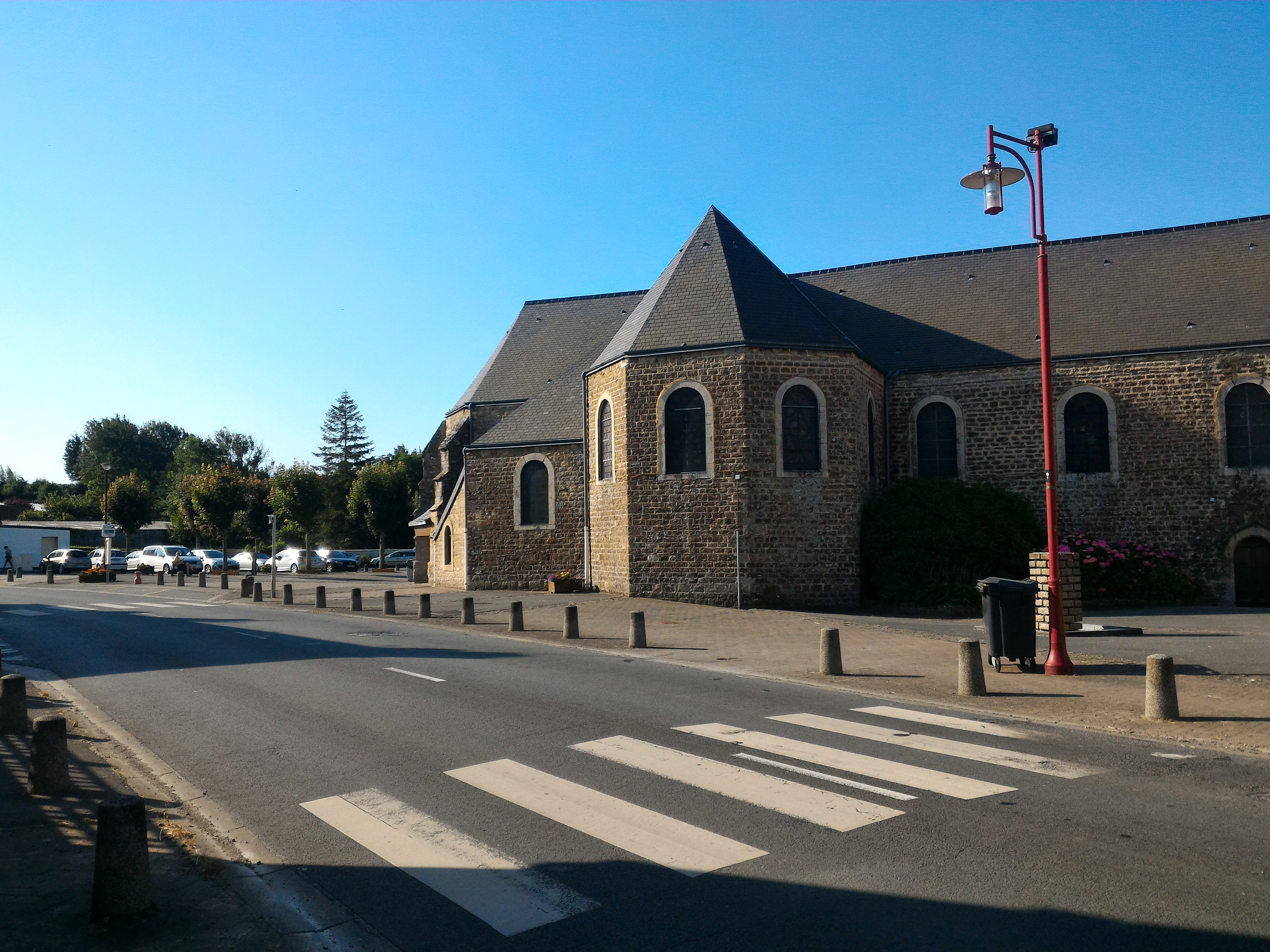
- The church square of Baincthun

- Coat of arms
- Location of Baincthun
- Location within France Location within Hauts-de-France
- Coordinates: 50°42′38″N 1°40′52″E
- Country: France
- Region: Hauts-de-France
- Department: Pas-de-Calais
- Arrondissement: Boulogne-sur-Mer
- Canton: Boulogne-sur-Mer-2
- Intercommunality: CA Boulonnais

Government
  - Mayor (2020–2026): Stéphane Bourgeois
- Area^{1}: 26.69 km^{2} (10.31 sq mi)
- Elevation: 32 m (105 ft)
- Highest elevation: 133 m (436 ft)
- Lowest elevation: 22 m (72 ft)
- Population (2023): 1,324
  - Density: 49.61/km^{2} (128.5/sq mi)
- Time zone: UTC+01:00 (CET)
  - Summer (DST): UTC+02:00 (CEST)
- INSEE/Postal code: 62075 /62360
- ^{1} French Land Register data, which excludes lakes, ponds, glaciers > 1 km^{2} (0.386 sq mi or 247 acres) and river estuaries.

Baincthun (French: [bɛ̃ktœ̃]) is a commune in the Pas-de-Calais department in the Hauts-de-France region of France.

== Geography ==
A farming and quarrying commune, some 4 miles (6.4 km) southeast of Boulogne-sur-Mer, at the junction of the D341 and the D234 roads.

== Population ==
Historical population
Year	Pop.	±% p.a.
1968	1,082	—
1975	1,071	−0.15%
1982	1,087	+0.21%
1990	1,147	+0.67%
1999	1,207	+0.57%
2007	1,364	+1.54%
2012	1,330	−0.50%
2017	1,291	−0.59%
2023	1,324	+0.42%
Source: INSEE

== Sights ==
- A feudal motte.
- The church of St. Martin.
- The Château d'Ordre, dating from 1672 at the hamlet of Maquinghen.
- The manor at Lannoy.

== See also ==
- Communes of the Pas-de-Calais department
