= Équihen-Plage =

Équihen-Plage Ekingem
- Commune
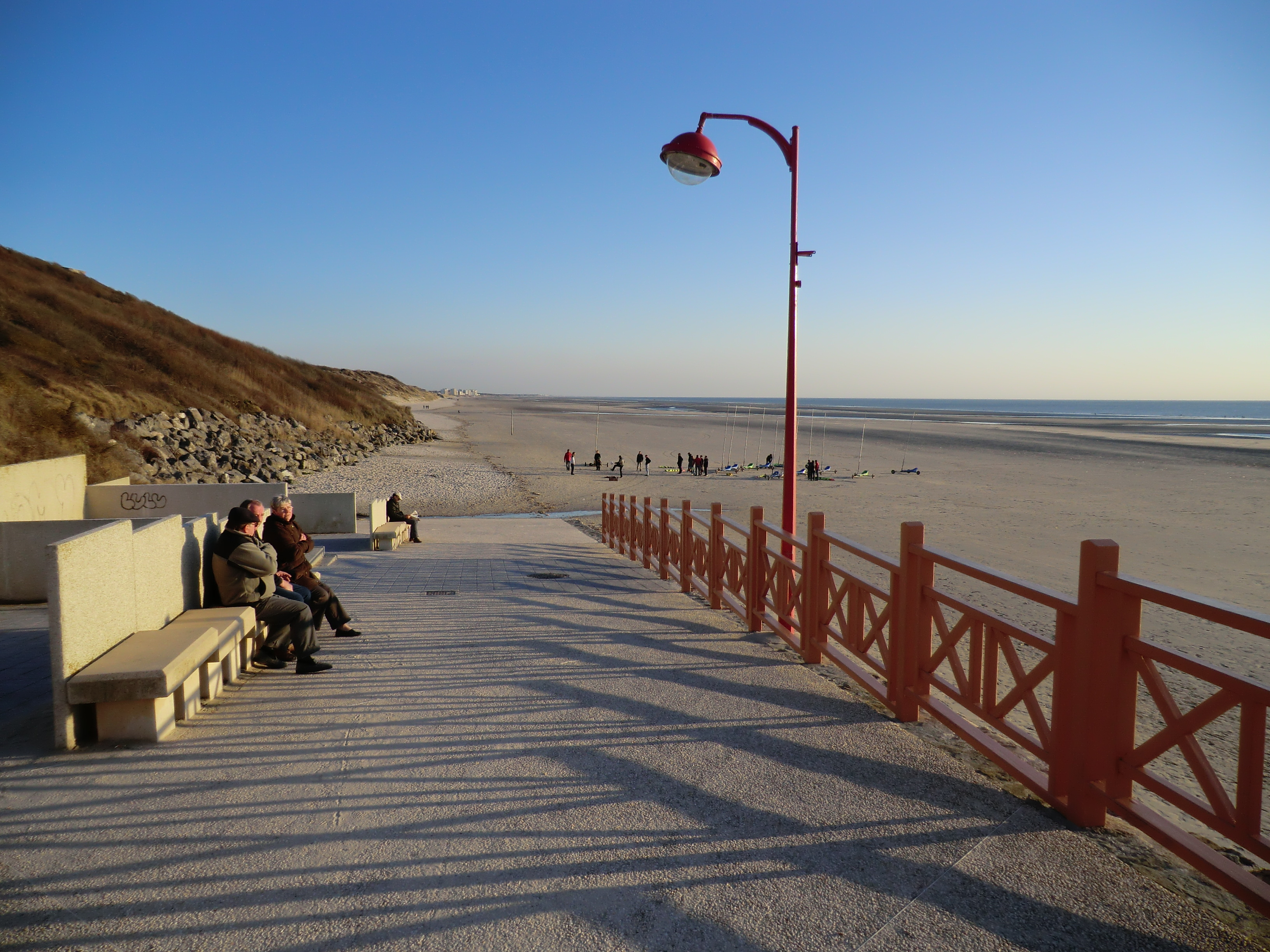
- The beach of Équihen-Plage

- Coat of arms
- Location of Équihen-Plage
- Location within France Location within Hauts-de-France
- Coordinates: 50°40′40″N 1°34′24″E
- Country: France
- Region: Hauts-de-France
- Department: Pas-de-Calais
- Arrondissement: Boulogne-sur-Mer
- Canton: Outreau
- Intercommunality: CA du Boulonnais

Government
  - Mayor (2026–32): Christian Fourcroy
- Area^{1}: 3.81 km^{2} (1.47 sq mi)
- Elevation: 55 m (180 ft)
- Highest elevation: 96 m (315 ft)
- Lowest elevation: 0 m (0 ft)
- Population (2023): 2,619
  - Density: 687/km^{2} (1,780/sq mi)
- Time zone: UTC+01:00 (CET)
  - Summer (DST): UTC+02:00 (CEST)
- INSEE/Postal code: 62300 /62224
- ^{1} French Land Register data, which excludes lakes, ponds, glaciers > 1 km^{2} (0.386 sq mi or 247 acres) and river estuaries.

Équihen-Plage (French pronunciation: [ekiɛ̃ plaʒ]; West Flemish: Ekingem) is a commune in the Pas-de-Calais department in the Hauts-de-France region of France.

== Geography ==
A fishing port and farming village situated some 3 miles (4.8 km) south of Boulogne, at the junction of the D236e and the D119 roads, on the English Channel coast.

== Population ==
Historical population
Year	Pop.	±% p.a.
1968	2,592	—
1975	2,868	+1.46%
1982	3,164	+1.41%
1990	3,067	−0.39%
1999	2,934	−0.49%
2007	2,944	+0.04%
2012	2,919	−0.17%
2017	2,738	−1.27%
2023	2,619	−0.74%
Source: INSEE

== Places of interest ==
- The stele of the painter Edmond de Palézieux.
- The stele of the painter Jean-Charles Cazin.
- The war memorial
- The church of St. Pierre, rebuilt after World War II. It houses numerous heritage items listed in the Palissy database, three of which are registered as historical monument objects.
- A village that uses upcycled boats as the roofs of homes.

== See also ==
- Communes of the Pas-de-Calais department
