= Pernes-lès-Boulogne =

- Commune
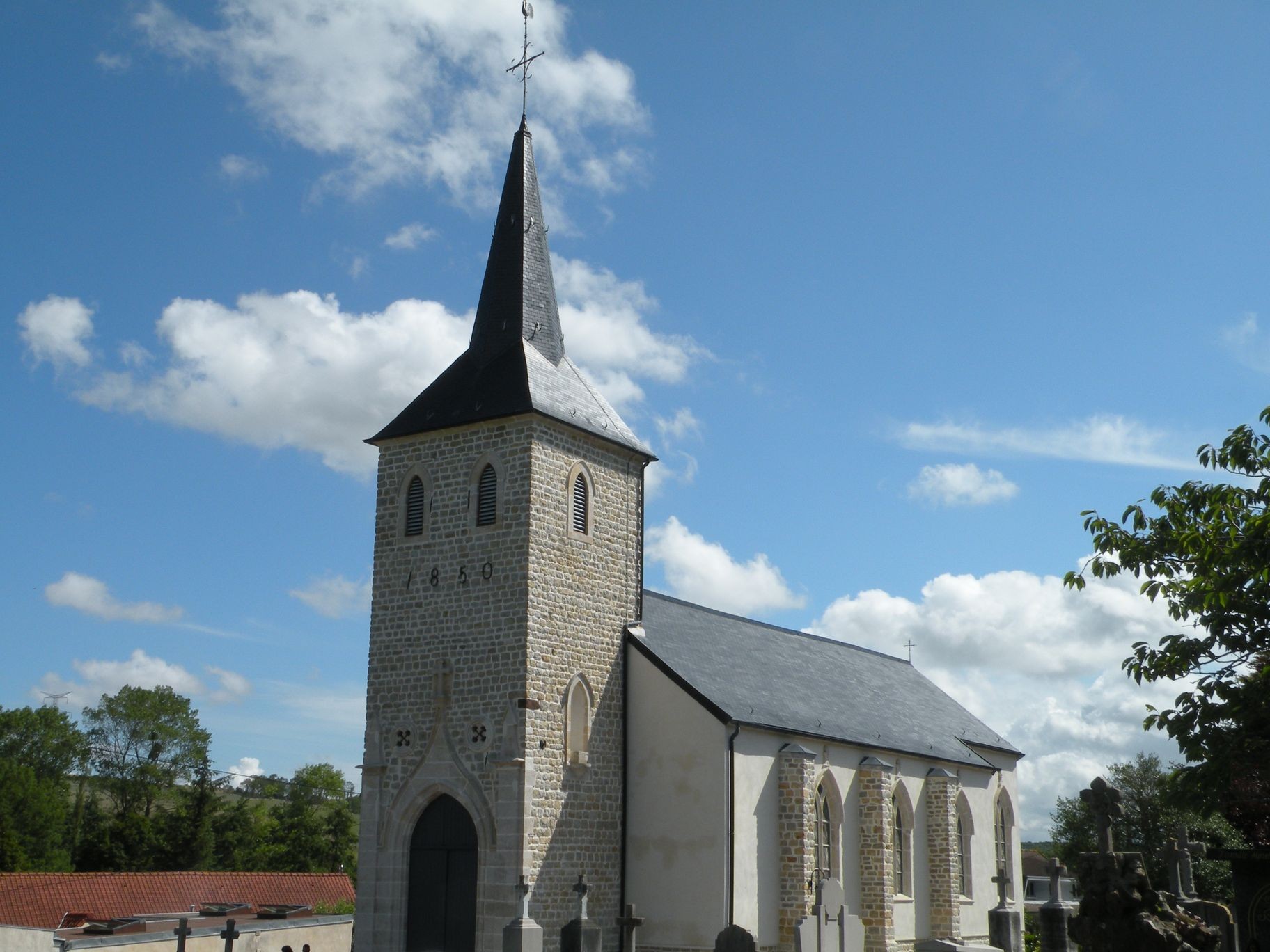
- The church of Pernes-lès-Boulogne

- Coat of arms
- Location of Pernes-lès-Boulogne
- Location within France Location within Hauts-de-France
- Coordinates: 50°45′09″N 1°42′13″E
- Country: France
- Region: Hauts-de-France
- Department: Pas-de-Calais
- Arrondissement: Boulogne-sur-Mer
- Canton: Boulogne-sur-Mer-1
- Intercommunality: CA du Boulonnais

Government
  - Mayor (2020–2026): Serge Quetu
- Area^{1}: 7.76 km^{2} (3.00 sq mi)
- Elevation: 23 m (75 ft)
- Highest elevation: 109 m (358 ft)
- Lowest elevation: 15 m (49 ft)
- Population (2023): 422
  - Density: 54.4/km^{2} (141/sq mi)
- Time zone: UTC+01:00 (CET)
  - Summer (DST): UTC+02:00 (CEST)
- INSEE/Postal code: 62653 /62126
- ^{1} French Land Register data, which excludes lakes, ponds, glaciers > 1 km^{2} (0.386 sq mi or 247 acres) and river estuaries.

Pernes-lès-Boulogne (French pronunciation: [pɛʁn lɛ bulɔɲ], literally Pernes near Boulogne) is a commune in the Pas-de-Calais department in the Hauts-de-France region of France.

== Geography ==
Pernes-lès-Boulogne is situated 5 miles (8.0 km) northeast of Boulogne, at the junction of the D233 and D233e roads.

== Population ==
Historical population
| Year | Pop. | ±% p.a. |
|---|---|---|
| 1968 | 345 | — |
| 1975 | 331 | −0.59% |
| 1982 | 412 | +3.18% |
| 1990 | 466 | +1.55% |
| 1999 | 423 | −1.07% |
| 2007 | 467 | +1.24% |
| 2012 | 464 | −0.13% |
| 2017 | 421 | −1.93% |
| 2023 | 422 | +0.04% |
Source: INSEE

== Transport ==
The Chemin de fer de Boulogne à Bonningues (CF de BB) opened a station at Pernes-lès-Boulogne on 22 April 1900. Passenger services were withdrawn on 31 December 1935. They were reinstated in November 1942. The CF de BB closed in 1948.

== Places of interest ==
- The church of St. Esprit, dating from the nineteenth century.
- The three 16th century manorhouses of Senlecque, Godincthun and Huplandre.

== See also ==
- Communes of the Pas-de-Calais department
