= Condette =

- Commune
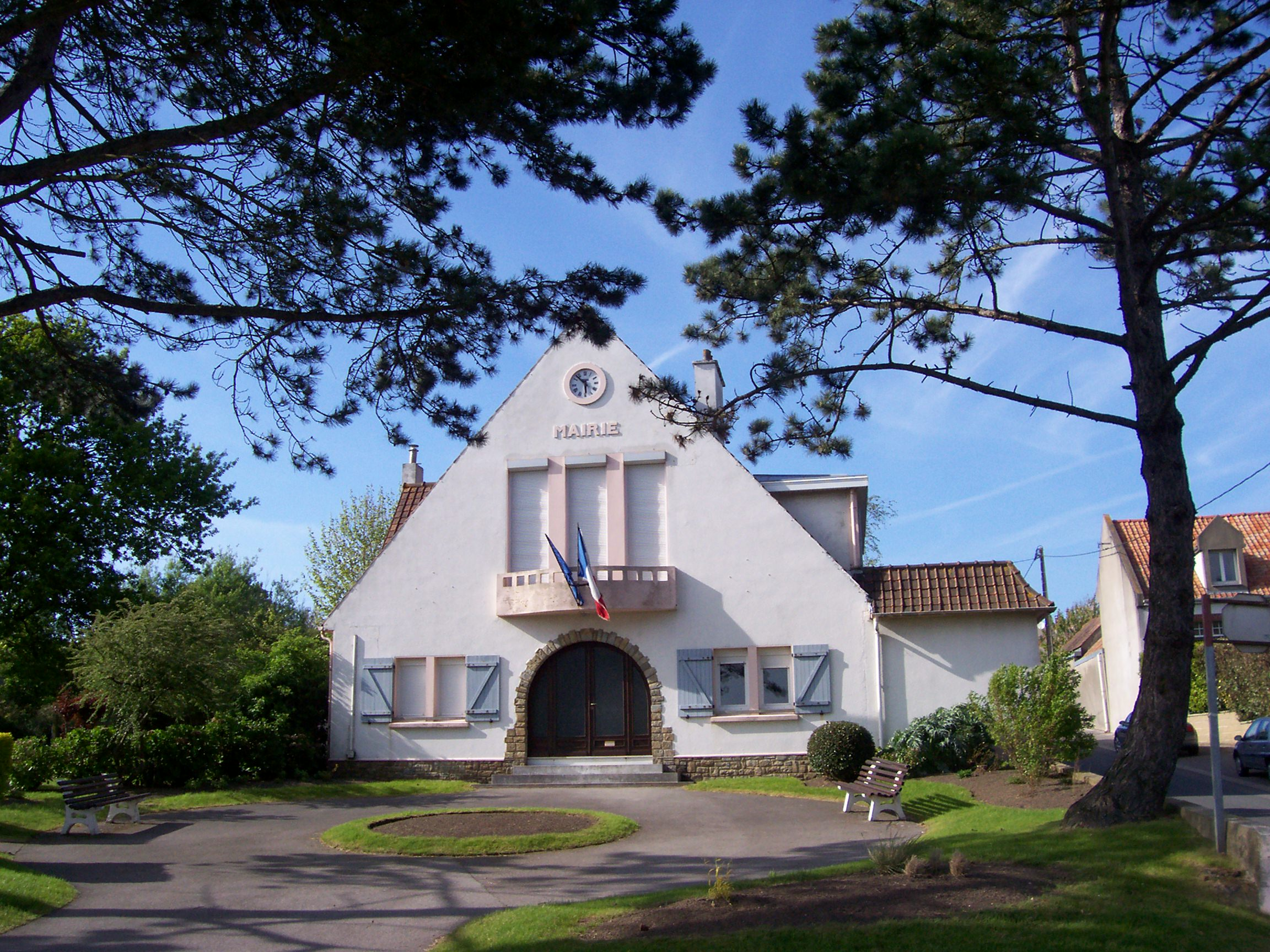
- The town hall of Condette

- Coat of arms
- Location of Condette
- Location within France Location within Hauts-de-France
- Coordinates: 50°39′18″N 1°38′03″E
- Country: France
- Region: Hauts-de-France
- Department: Pas-de-Calais
- Arrondissement: Boulogne-sur-Mer
- Canton: Outreau
- Intercommunality: CA du Boulonnais

Government
  - Mayor (2020–2026): Hervé Leclercq
- Area^{1}: 16.26 km^{2} (6.28 sq mi)
- Elevation: 35 m (115 ft)
- Highest elevation: 106 m (348 ft)
- Lowest elevation: 6 m (20 ft)
- Population (2023): 2,443
  - Density: 150.2/km^{2} (389.1/sq mi)
- Time zone: UTC+01:00 (CET)
  - Summer (DST): UTC+02:00 (CEST)
- INSEE/Postal code: 62235 /62360
- ^{1} French Land Register data, which excludes lakes, ponds, glaciers > 1 km^{2} (0.386 sq mi or 247 acres) and river estuaries.

Condette (French pronunciation: [kɔ̃dɛt]) is a commune in the Pas-de-Calais department in the Hauts-de-France region of France 6 miles (9.7 km) south of Boulogne-sur-Mer. The river Liane forms the northeast commune border.

== Population ==
Historical population
Year	Pop.	±% p.a.
1968	1,611	—
1975	1,869	+2.14%
1982	2,084	+1.57%
1990	2,392	+1.74%
1999	2,675	+1.25%
2007	2,585	−0.43%
2012	2,574	−0.09%
2017	2,506	−0.53%
2023	2,443	−0.42%
Source: INSEE

== See also ==
- Communes of the Pas-de-Calais department

== Gallery ==
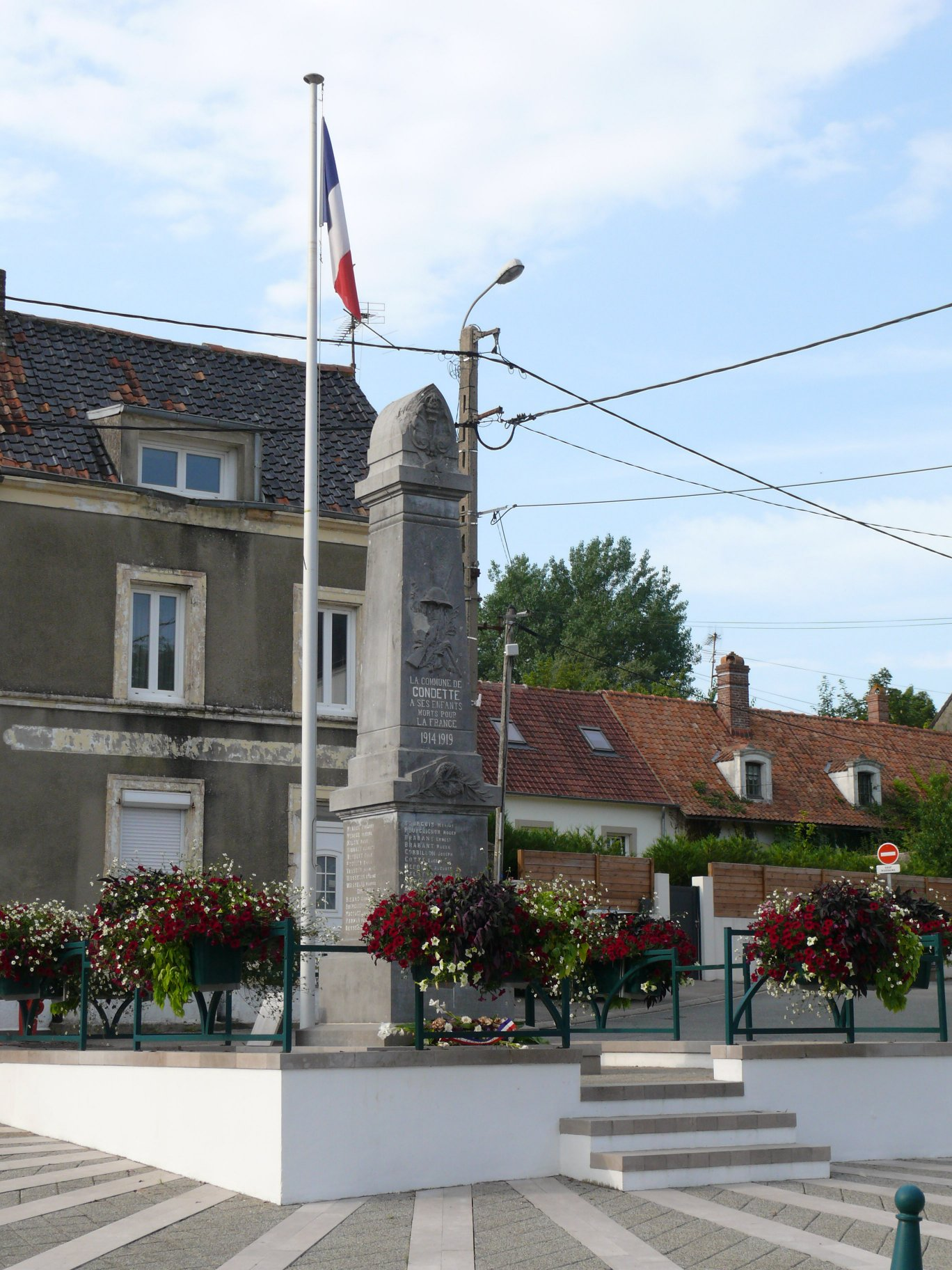
Memorial to the fallen

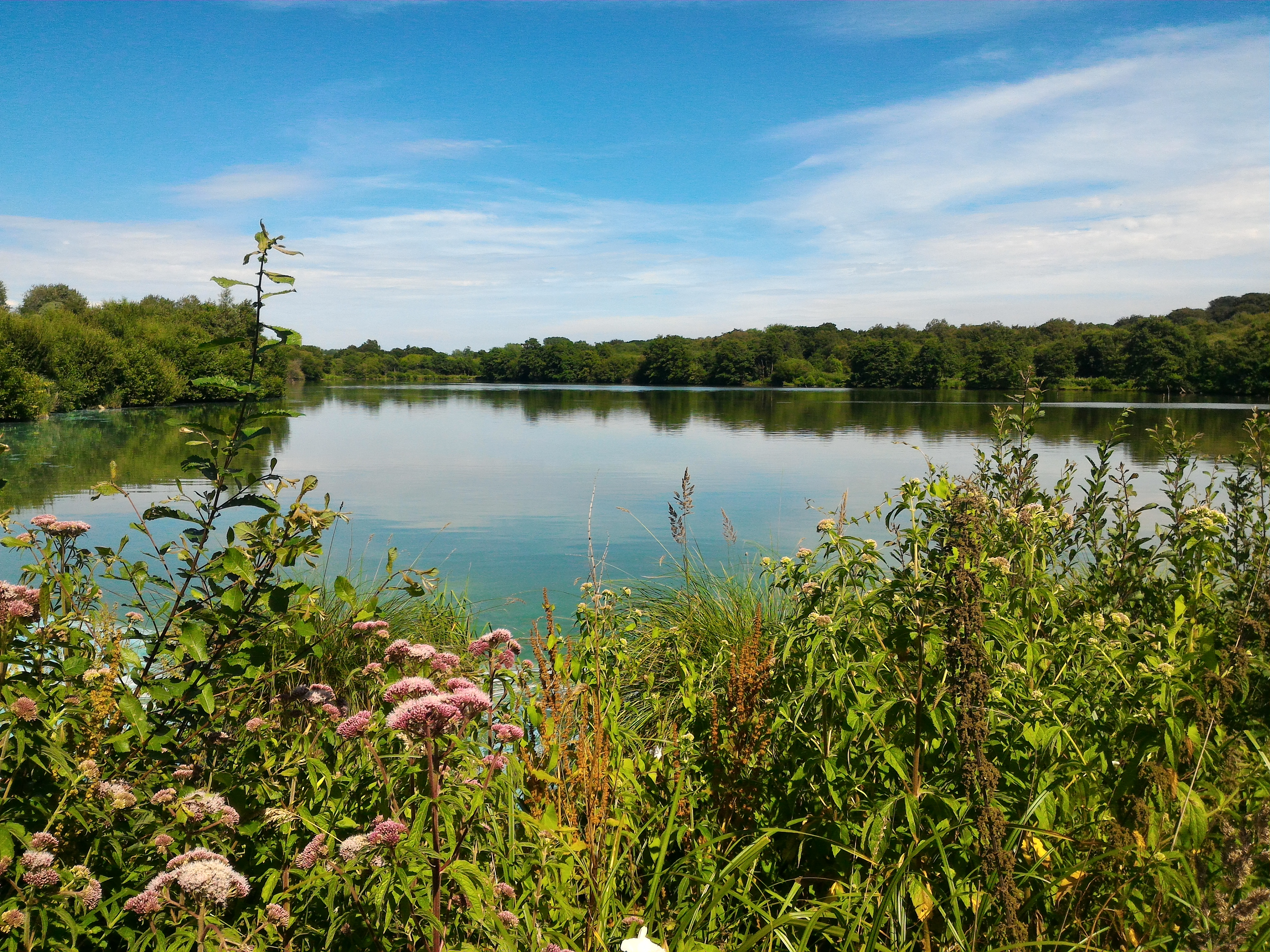
The reflecting lakes of Condette

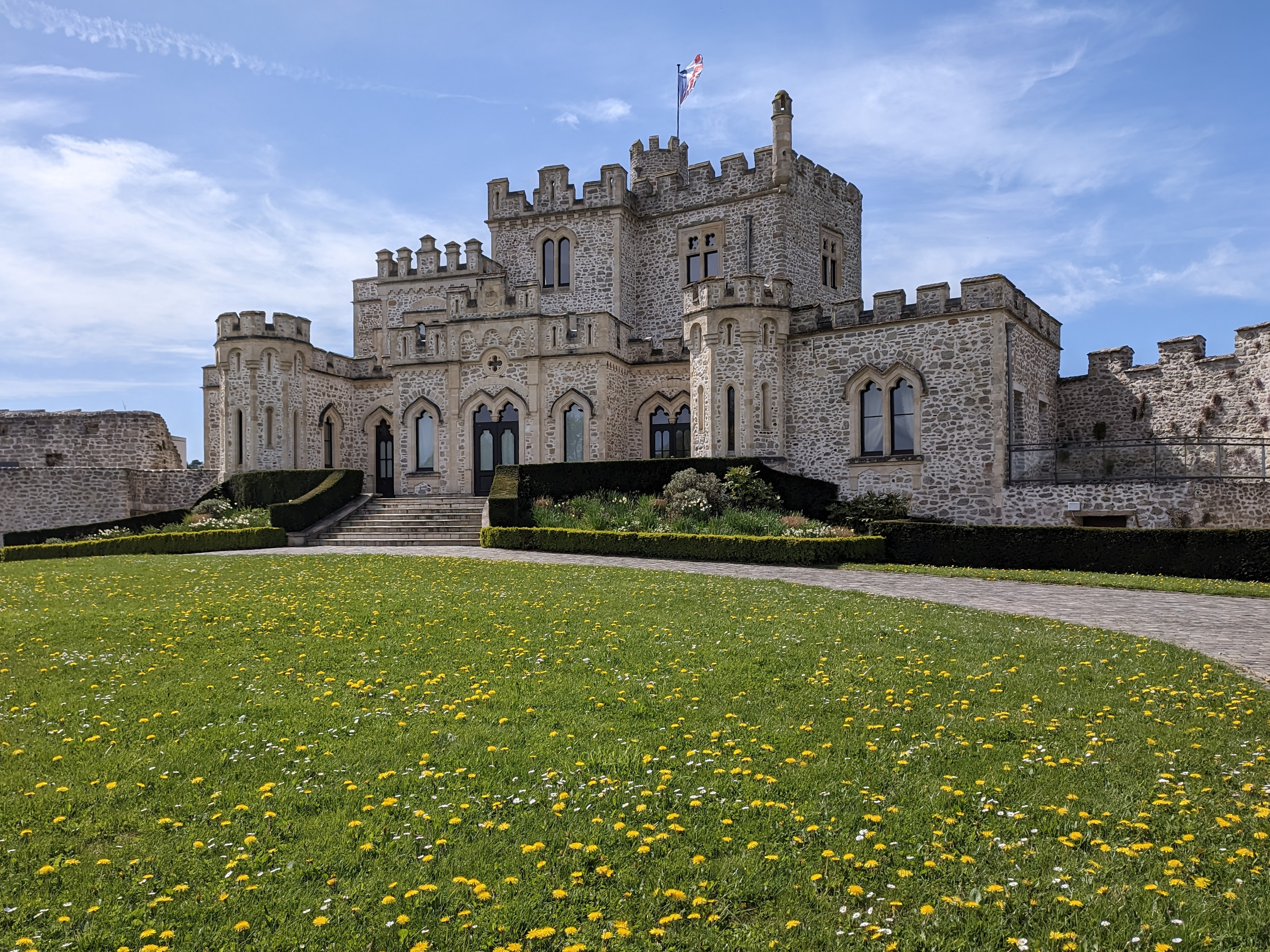
Chateau d'Hardelot
