= Pittefaux =

Pittefaux Pitesveld
- Commune
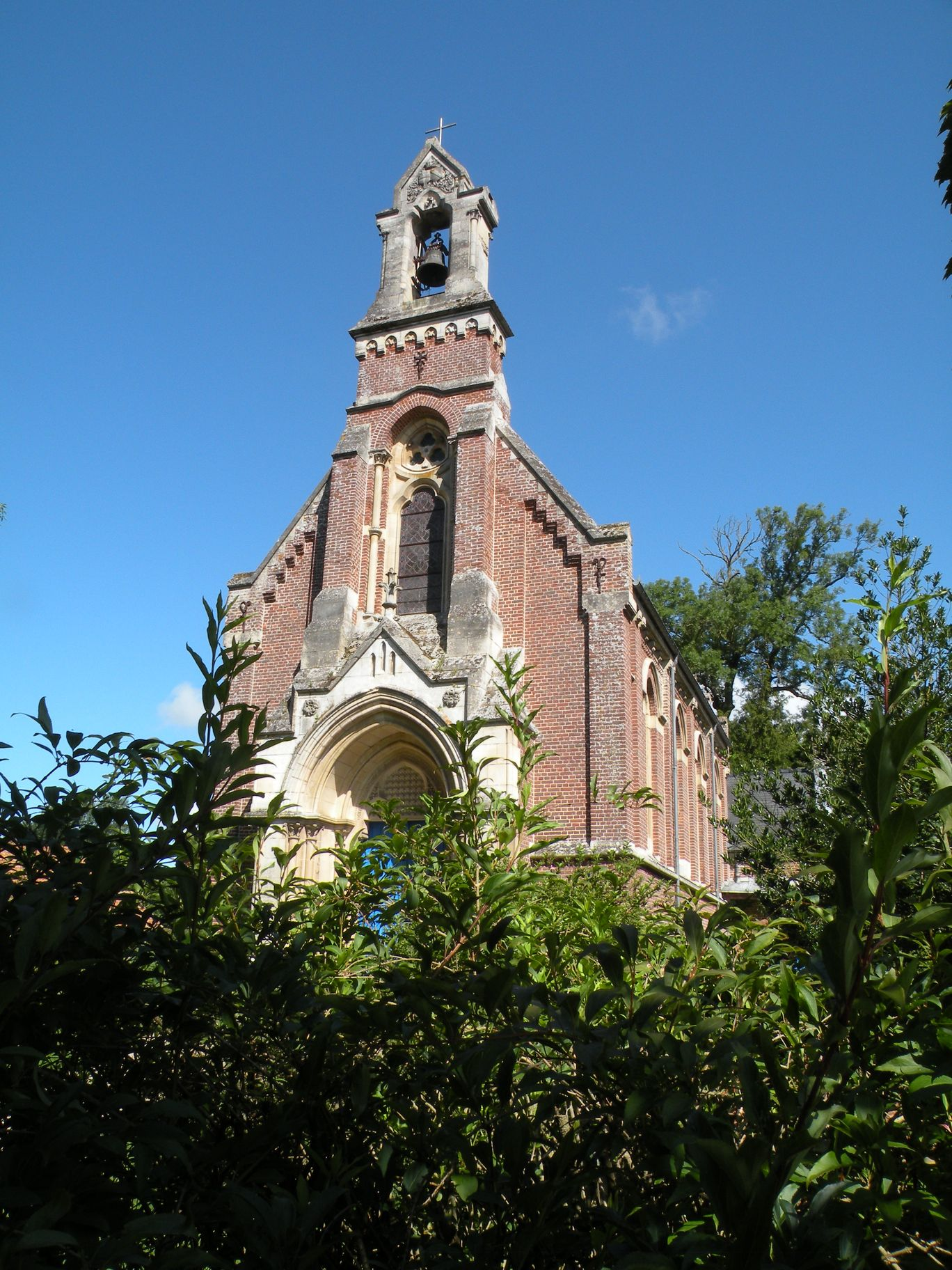
- The church of Pittefaux

- Coat of arms
- Location of Pittefaux
- Location within France Location within Hauts-de-France
- Coordinates: 50°45′28″N 1°41′05″E
- Country: France
- Region: Hauts-de-France
- Department: Pas-de-Calais
- Arrondissement: Boulogne-sur-Mer
- Canton: Boulogne-sur-Mer-1
- Intercommunality: CA du Boulonnais

Government
  - Mayor (2020–2026): Patrick Coppin
- Area^{1}: 2.42 km^{2} (0.93 sq mi)
- Elevation: 20 m (66 ft)
- Highest elevation: 102 m (335 ft)
- Lowest elevation: 13 m (43 ft)
- Population (2023): 114
  - Density: 47.1/km^{2} (122/sq mi)
- Time zone: UTC+01:00 (CET)
  - Summer (DST): UTC+02:00 (CEST)
- INSEE/Postal code: 62658 /62126
- ^{1} French Land Register data, which excludes lakes, ponds, glaciers > 1 km^{2} (0.386 sq mi or 247 acres) and river estuaries.

Pittefaux (French pronunciation: [pitfo]; West Flemish: Pitesveld) is a commune in the Pas-de-Calais department in the Hauts-de-France region of France 5 miles (8.0 km) northeast of Boulogne.

== Population ==
Historical population
Year	Pop.	±% p.a.
1968	73	—
1975	63	−2.08%
1982	77	+2.91%
1990	115	+5.14%
1999	125	+0.93%
2007	126	+0.10%
2012	114	−1.98%
2017	124	+1.70%
2023	114	−1.39%
Source: INSEE

== See also ==
- Communes of the Pas-de-Calais department
