= La Capelle-lès-Boulogne =

- Commune
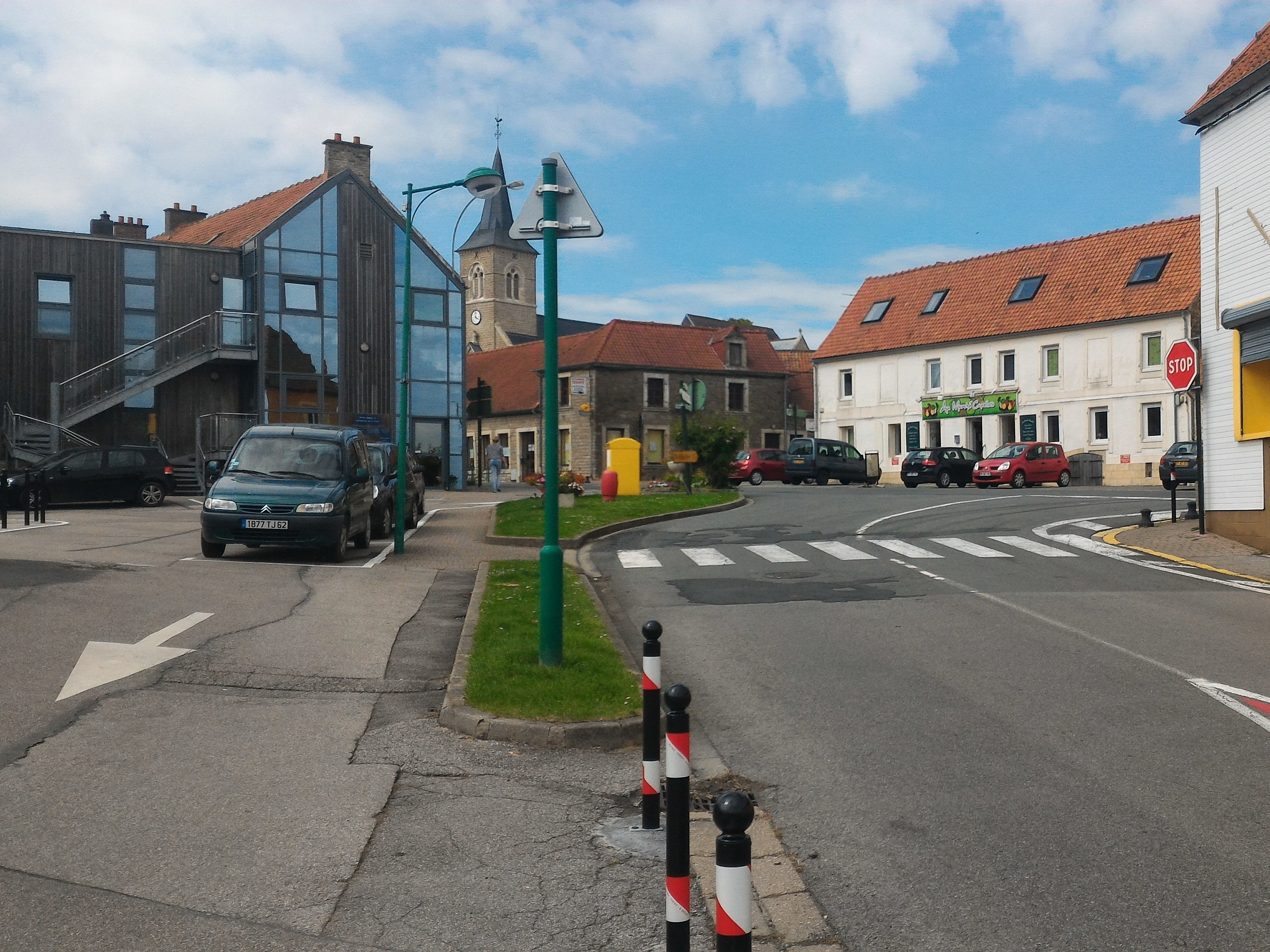
- The centre of La Capelle-lès-Boulogne

- Coat of arms
- Location of La Capelle-lès-Boulogne
- Location within France Location within Hauts-de-France
- Coordinates: 50°43′55″N 1°42′28″E
- Country: France
- Region: Hauts-de-France
- Department: Pas-de-Calais
- Arrondissement: Boulogne-sur-Mer
- Canton: Boulogne-sur-Mer-1
- Intercommunality: CA du Boulonnais

Government
  - Mayor (2020–2026): Jean-Michel Degremont
- Area^{1}: 6.5 km^{2} (2.5 sq mi)
- Elevation: 104 m (341 ft)
- Highest elevation: 108 m (354 ft)
- Lowest elevation: 39 m (128 ft)
- Population (2023): 1,551
  - Density: 240/km^{2} (620/sq mi)
- Time zone: UTC+01:00 (CET)
  - Summer (DST): UTC+02:00 (CEST)
- INSEE/Postal code: 62908 /62360
- ^{1} French Land Register data, which excludes lakes, ponds, glaciers > 1 km^{2} (0.386 sq mi or 247 acres) and river estuaries.

La Capelle-lès-Boulogne (French pronunciation: [la kapɛl lɛ bulɔɲ], literally La Capelle near Boulogne) is a commune in the Pas-de-Calais department in the Hauts-de-France region of France.

== Geography ==
A forestry and farming village situated some 4 miles (6.4 km) east of Boulogne, at the junction of the N42 with the D234 and D237.

== Transport ==
The Chemin de fer de Boulogne à Bonningues (CF de BB) opened a station at La Capelle-Lès-Boulogne on 22 April 1900. Passenger services were withdrawn on 31 December 1935. They were reinstated in November 1942. The CF de BB closed in 1948.

== Main sights ==
- The church of St.Jean-Baptiste, dating from the 19th century.
- The 18th-century chateau de Conteval.

== See also ==
- Communes of the Pas-de-Calais department
