= Neufchâtel-Hardelot =

Neufchâtel-Hardelot Neucatel-Hardelot Nieuwkasteel-Hardelo
- Commune
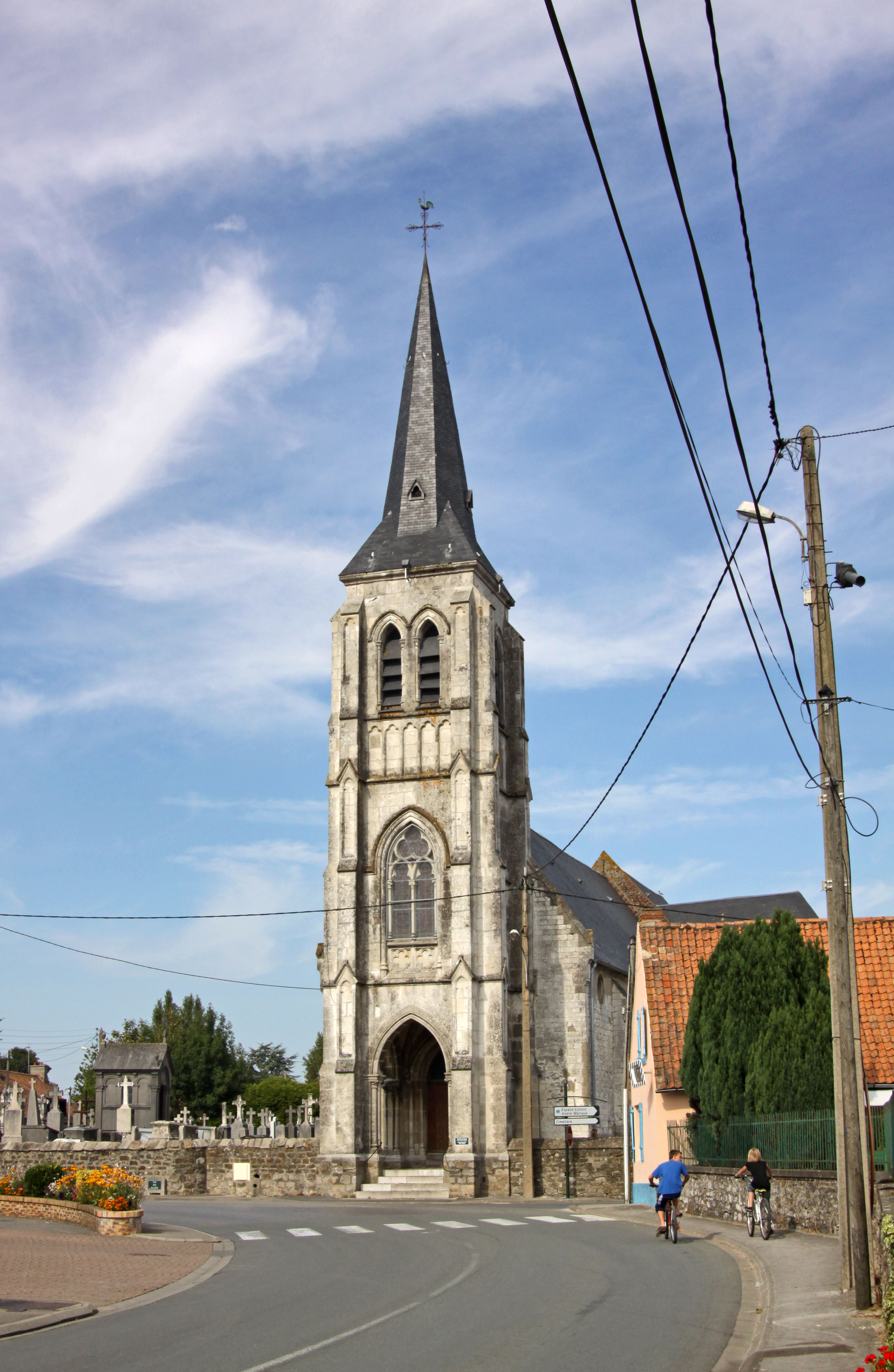
- The church of Neufchâtel-Hardelot

- Coat of arms
- Location of Neufchâtel-Hardelot
- Location within France Location within Hauts-de-France
- Coordinates: 50°37′N 1°38′E
- Country: France
- Region: Hauts-de-France
- Department: Pas-de-Calais
- Arrondissement: Boulogne-sur-Mer
- Canton: Outreau
- Intercommunality: CA du Boulonnais

Government
  - Mayor (2020–2026): Paulette Juilien-Peuvion
- Area^{1}: 20.85 km^{2} (8.05 sq mi)
- Elevation: 56 m (184 ft)
- Highest elevation: 155 m (509 ft)
- Lowest elevation: 4 m (13 ft)
- Population (2023): 4,115
  - Density: 197.4/km^{2} (511.2/sq mi)
- Time zone: UTC+01:00 (CET)
  - Summer (DST): UTC+02:00 (CEST)
- INSEE/Postal code: 62604 /62152
- ^{1} French Land Register data, which excludes lakes, ponds, glaciers > 1 km^{2} (0.386 sq mi or 247 acres) and river estuaries.

Neufchâtel-Hardelot (French pronunciation: [nøʃɑtɛl aʁdəlo]; Picard: Neucatel-Hardelot; West Flemish: Nieuwkasteel-Hardelo) is a commune in the Pas-de-Calais department in the Hauts-de-France region of France about 8 miles (13 km) south of Boulogne. The commune's western border is the English Channel.

== History ==
The resort was designed by architect Louis Marie Cordonnier in the early 20th century.

Harriet Quimby, the first woman to fly across the Channel, flew from Dover to Hardelot-Plage on 16 April 1912.

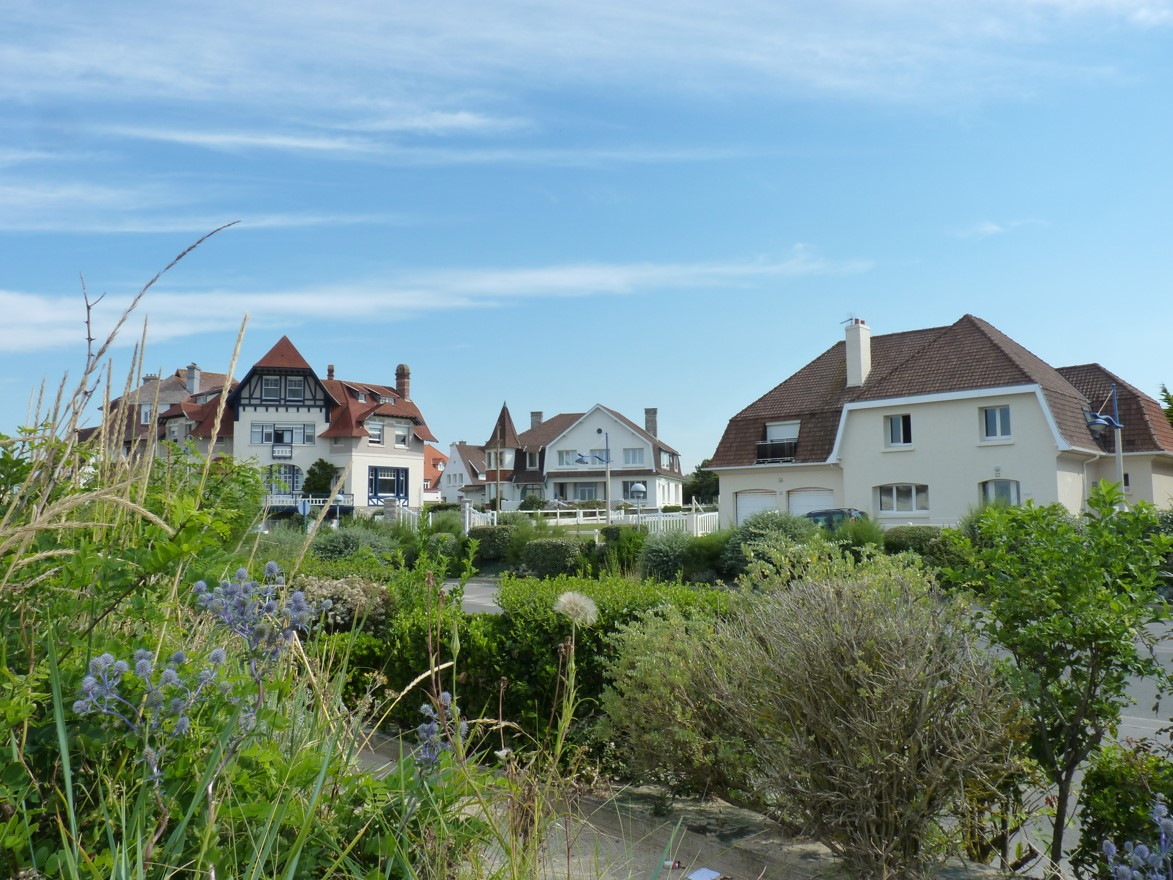
Hardelot-Plage, new mansions designed by architect Maurice Culot, 2002

== Population ==
Historical population
Year	Pop.	±% p.a.
1968	2,007	—
1975	2,392	+2.54%
1982	2,712	+1.81%
1990	3,035	+1.42%
1999	3,585	+1.87%
2007	3,784	+0.68%
2012	3,749	−0.19%
2017	3,746	−0.02%
2023	4,115	+1.58%
Source: INSEE

== See also ==
- Communes of the Pas-de-Calais department
