= Boulonnais (region) =

Coastal area of northern France

Coordinates: 50°43′N 1°46′E

The Boulonnais, on the Côte d'Opale is the land around seaside Boulogne-sur-Mer. Notably just south are Le Touquet and its broad Canche estuary, shown purely for their proximity.

The Boulonnais (French pronunciation: [bu.lɔ.nɛ]) is the associated coast and hinterland of Boulogne-sur-Mer in Northern France. It includes the catchment of the town's river Liane, and other shorter small rivers that also flow west. It spans north to all of Cap Gris-Nez which has two coasts but not the bay of Wissant (which is west of Calais and is loosely associated with that port town). It runs south 30 kilometres almost to Camiers, a village north of Le Touquet, a nonetheless low-rise, but estuarine conglomeration of housing and holiday parks, as the Boulonnais includes Dannes and its golf courses. It extends between 15 and 20 kilometres inland. It has a curved belt of chalk downs which meet the sea at both ends, the higher being Gris-Nez. It is a well-wooded zone almost entirely within the Caps et Marais d'Opale Regional Natural Park and is the east end of the Weald-Artois Anticline. Its coast all faces west to the English Channel (la Manche), apart from a short north coast, including the small beach of Cap Gris-Nez which faces the Strait of Dover ("le Pas de Calais"). It is the northernmost west-facing coast of France.

The entirely urban estuary of the Liane has been made uniformly wide and straight as well as supplemented by two wet docks, the Bassin Napoléon and Bassin Loubet, in Boulogne where it aligns NNW. A third basin serves ships, to the west. The coast has several cliffs, beaches which are mostly short in length and three lighthouses: Phare du Cap Gris-Nez, by the large town: Phare de la digue Carnot on the harbour wall and on a minor headland to the south-west of the town the Phare du Portel (or d'Alprech). The beach and west side of the town's (or viewed more locally, Outreau's) built-up area is mainly Le Portel which has many of its own amenities, its own commune so mayoralty since 1856 and during the Second World War, on 8 and 9 September 1943, it was hit as part of Operation Cockade. This was a diversion by the Allies to fool occupying Nazi Germany into the imminence of a landing on the English Channel. The bombings, which destroyed 93% of the village, also killed 376 civilians. On 12 August 1944, the leader of all Free French Forces and incoming elected president, Charles de Gaulle, was at Le Portel for its liberation. The town received the Croix de guerre with silver star for its sacrifice. The Boulonnais has numerous pill boxes and concrete fortifications from the Nazi occupation of France, as well as some larger Napeolonic forts and remnant buildings, often on the site of earlier fortifications.

Inland tourism supplements agriculture and other industries, such as storage, processing and distribution, including by summer festivals and concerts. In the off-season several attractions remain open. Château Mollack in Marquise, among those the English burnt in the raid of Boulogne in 1544 (its precursors dating to 1067) and rebuilt later that century in which form it remains, hosts in October–November a range of theatrical performances.

== Administration ==
The Pays Boulonnais comprises 3 intercommunalities: the Communauté d'agglomération du Boulonnais, the Communauté de communes de la Terre des Deux Caps and the Communauté de communes de Desvres - Samer, which have some legal status, far from eclipsing the powers of each commune, which in turn is less than of the département. All of these are in the département of Pas-de-Calais.

== Towns and villages of the Boulonnais ==
Intercommunality	Communes
Communauté d'agglomération du Boulonnais	Baincthun, Boulogne-sur-Mer, Condette, Conteville-lès-Boulogne, Dannes, Echinghen, Equihen-Plage, Hesdigneul-les-Boulogne, Hesdin l'Abbé, Isques, La Capelle-les-Boulogne, Le Portel, Nesles, Neufchâtel-Hardelot, Outreau, Pernes-lez-Boulogne, Pittefaux, Saint-Etienne-au-Mont, Saint-Léonard, Saint-Martin-Boulogne, Wimereux, Wimille
Communauté de communes de la Terre des deux Caps	Ambleteuse, Audembert, Audinghen, Audresselles, Bazinghen, Beuvrequen, Ferques, Hervelinghen, Landrethun-le-Nord, Leubringhen, Leulinghen-Bernes, Maninghen-Henne, Marquise, Offrethun, Réty
Communauté de communes de Desvres-Samer	Alincthun, Bellebrune, Belle-et-Houllefort, Bournonville, Brunembert, Carly, Colembert, Courset, Crémarest, Desvres, Doudeauville, Halinghen, Henneveux, Lacres, Le Wast, Longfossé, Longueville, Lottinghen, Menneville, Nabringhen, Quesques, Questrecques, Saint-Martin-Choquel, Samer, Selles, Senlecques, Tingry, Verlincthun, Vieil-Moutier, Wierre-au-Bois, Wirwignes

== See also ==
- Côte d'Opale
- Nausicaä Centre National de la Mer
- Port of Boulogne-sur-Mer

== Photo gallery ==
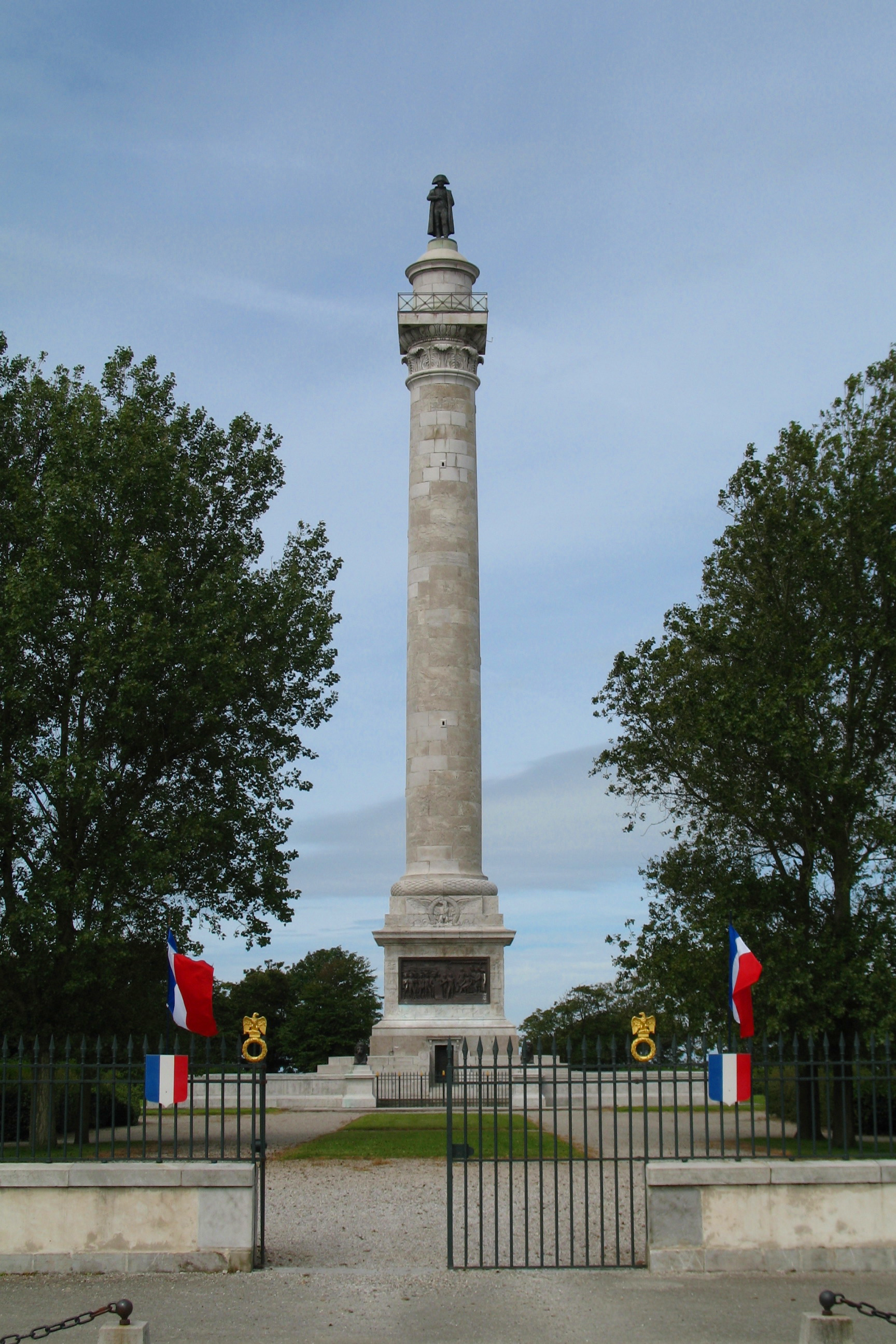
Wimille: The Column of the Grande Armée

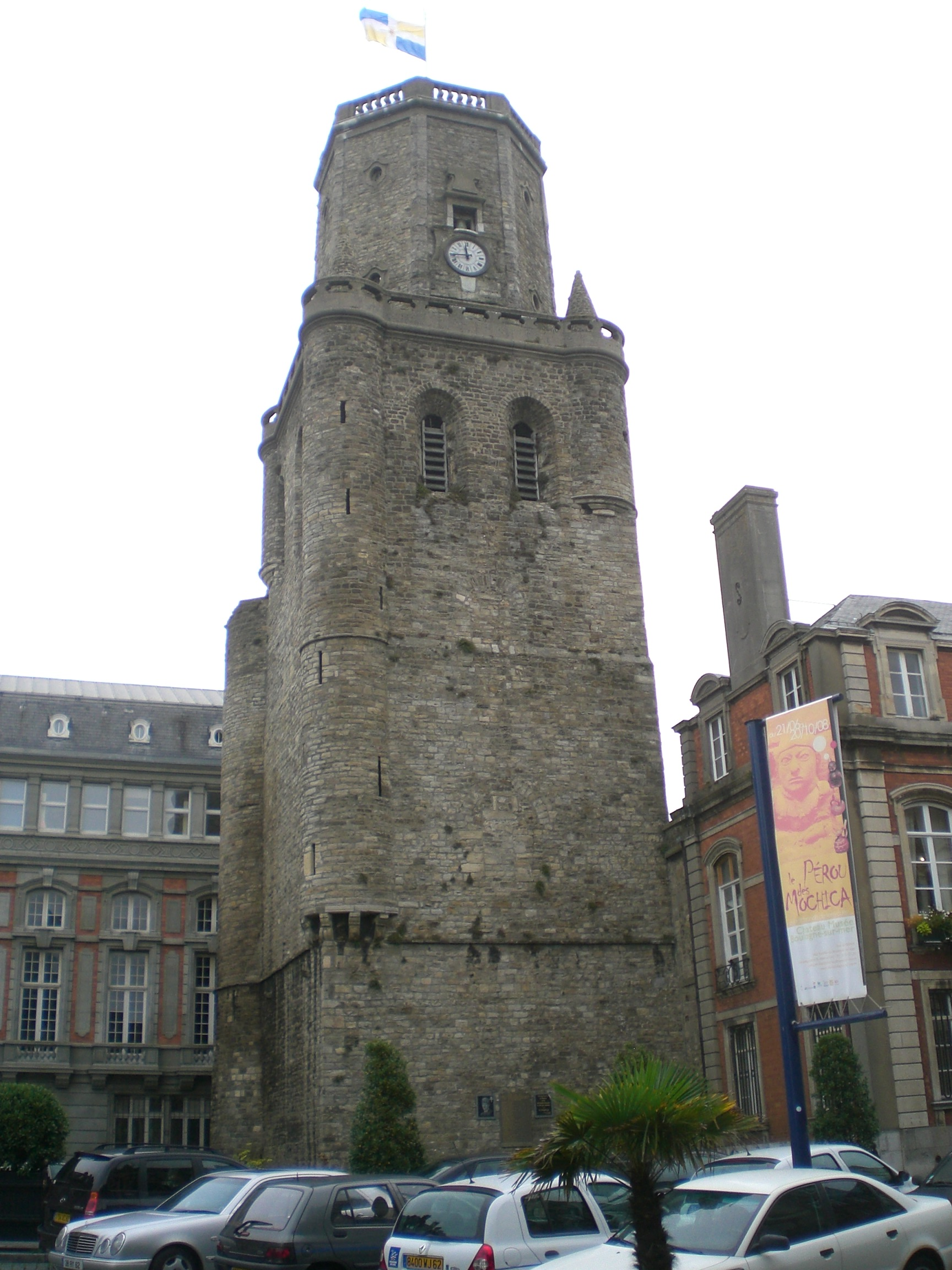
Boulogne-sur-Mer: The Belfry, UNESCO World Heritage Site

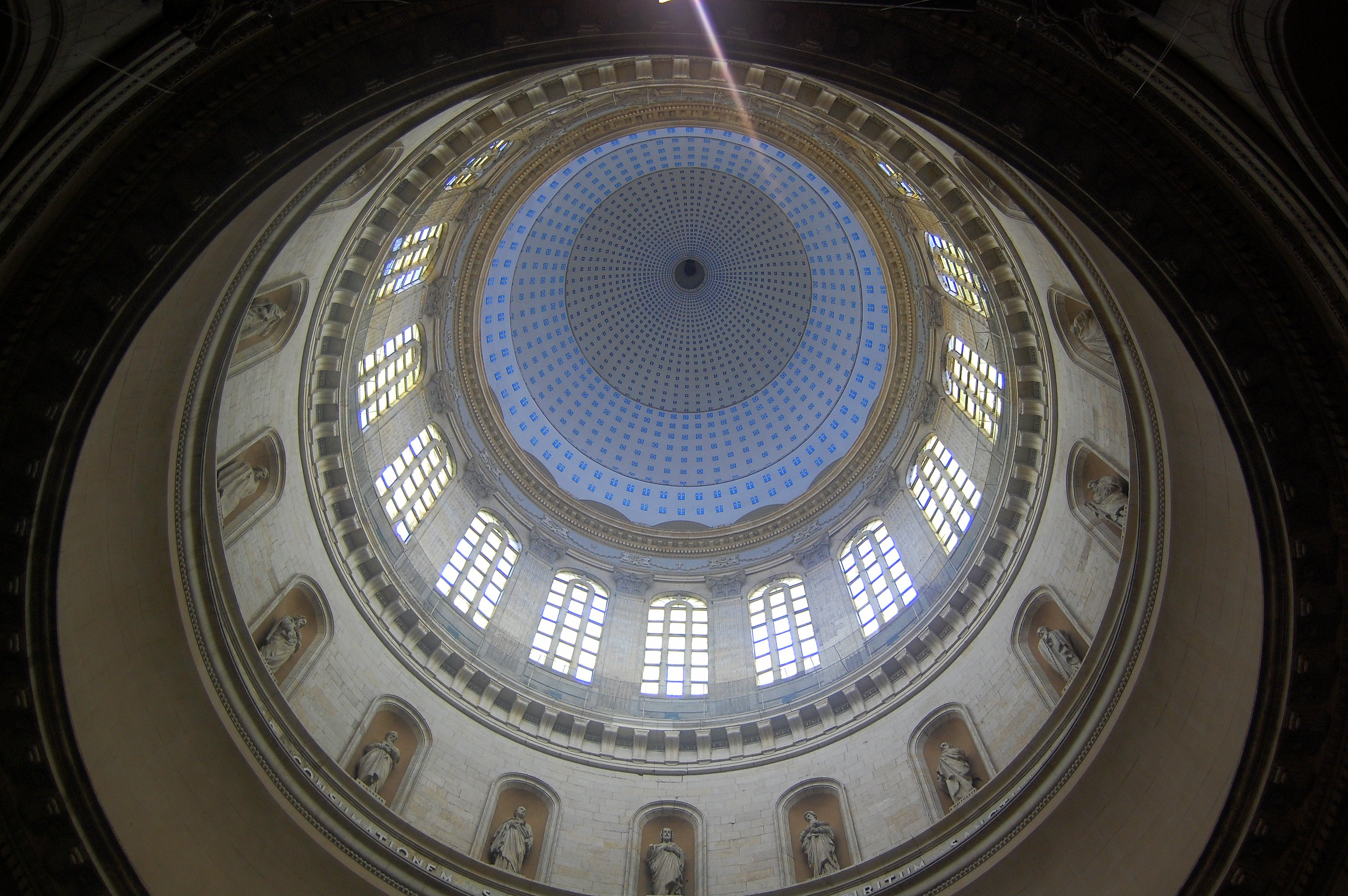
Boulogne-sur-Mer: Inside the basilica Notre Dame.

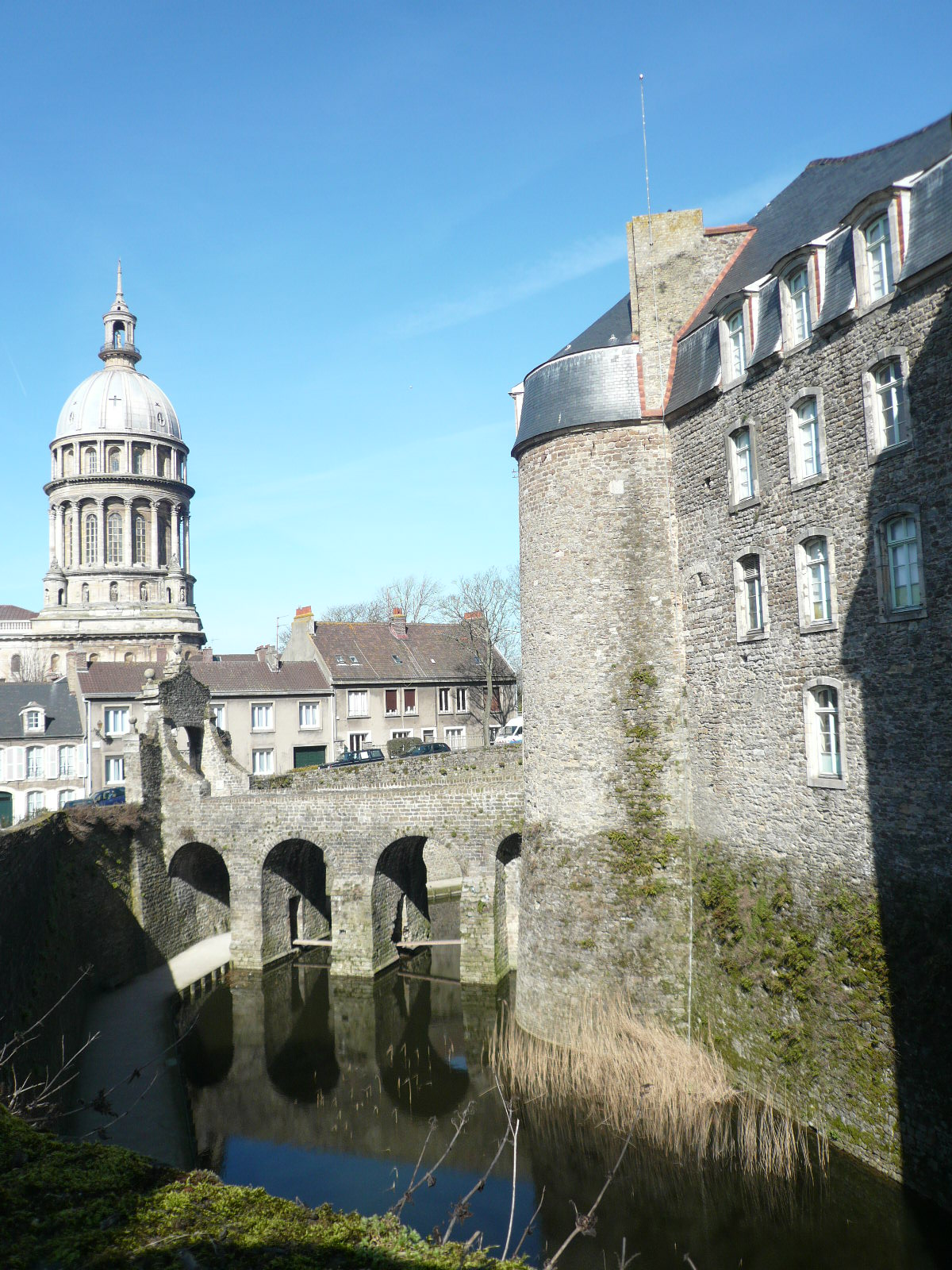
Boulogne-sur-Mer: Basilica and Castle Museum.

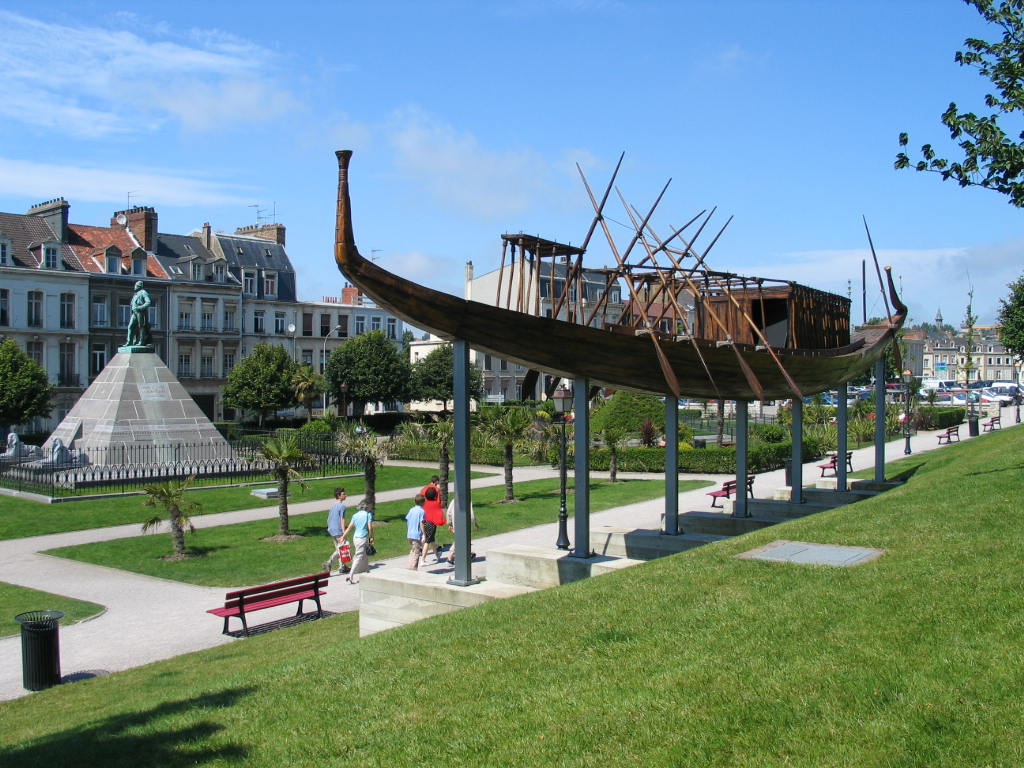
Boulogne-sur-Mer: around the fortifications.

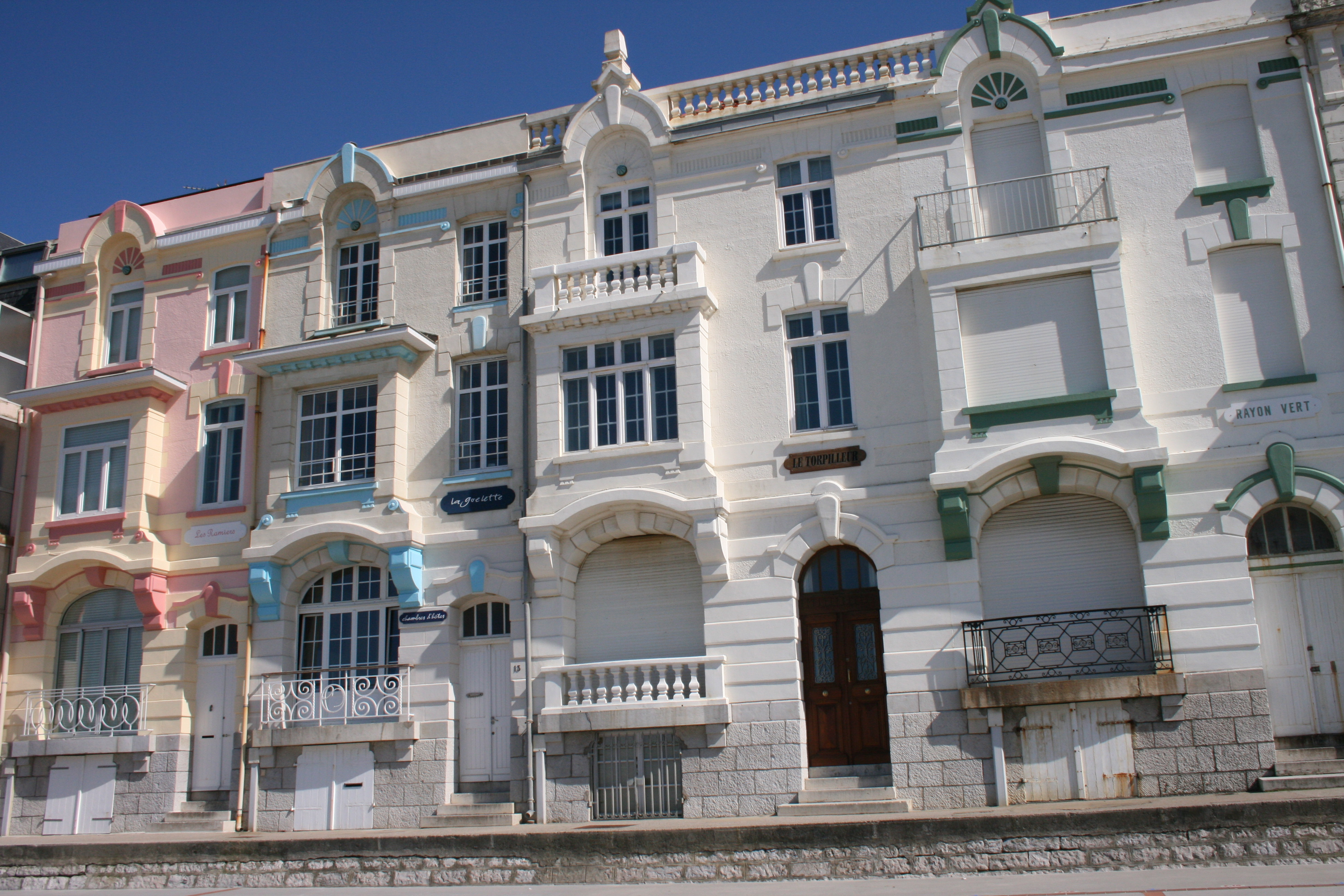
Villa in Wimereux.

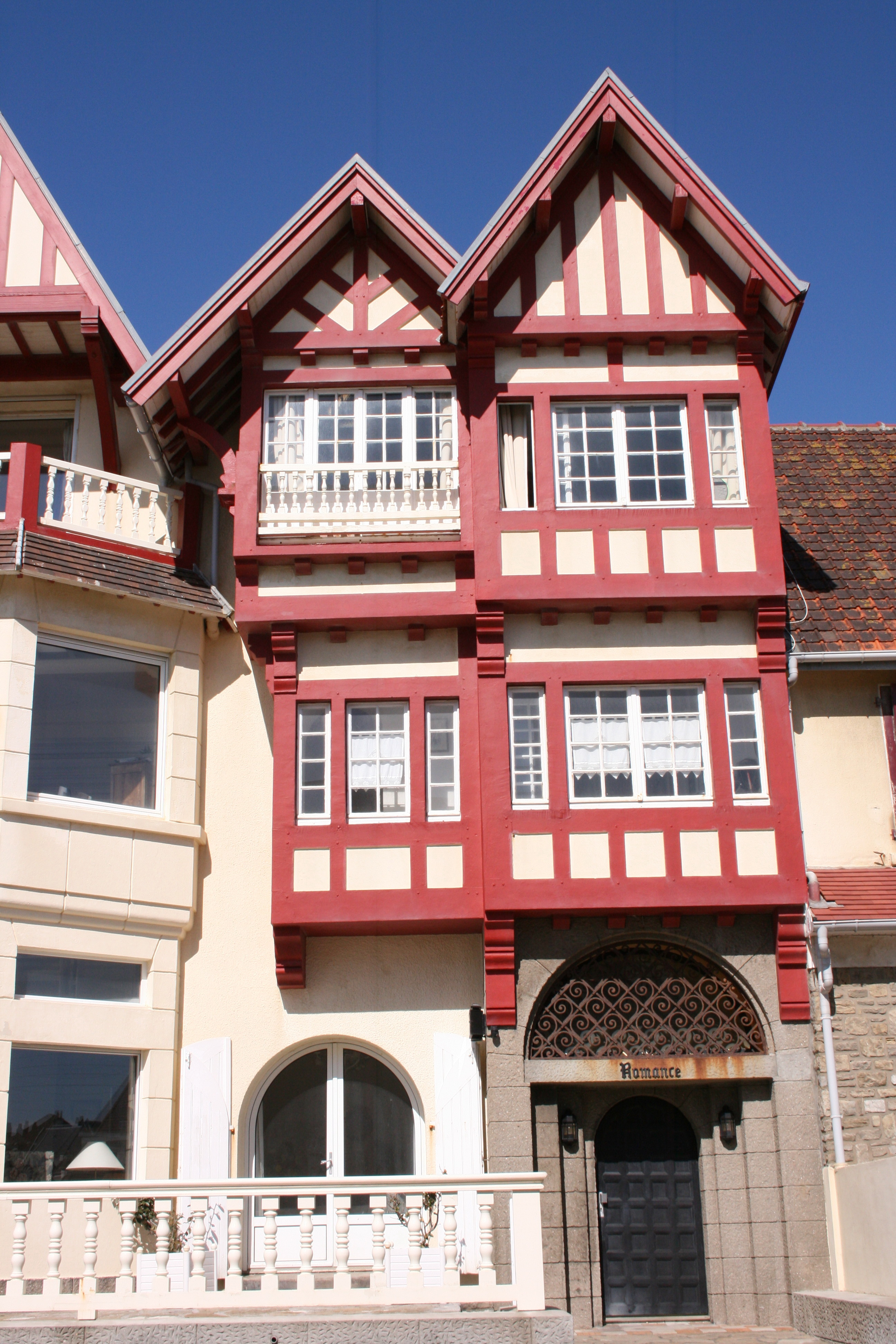
Villa in Wimereux.

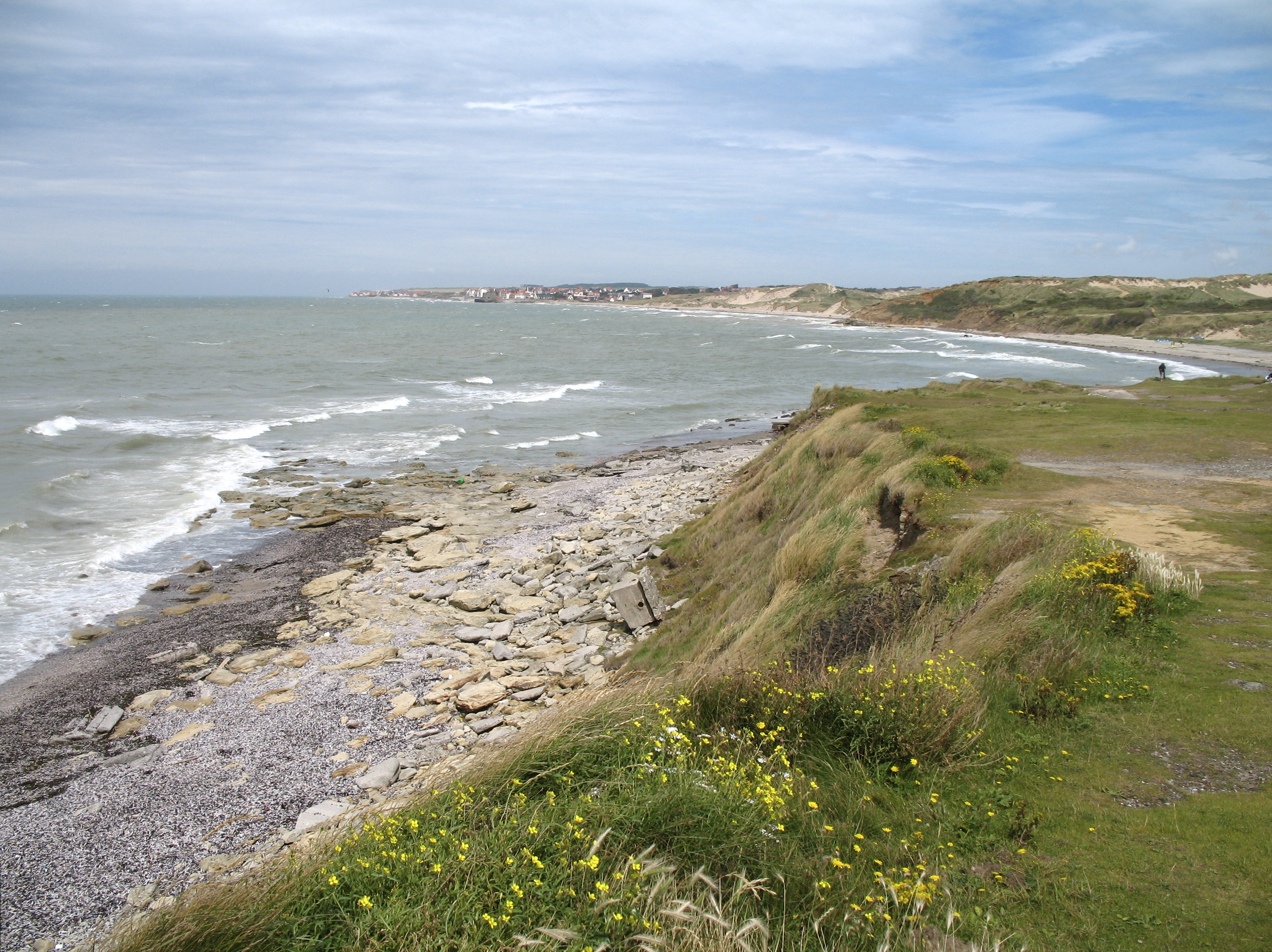
Wimereux: looking north.

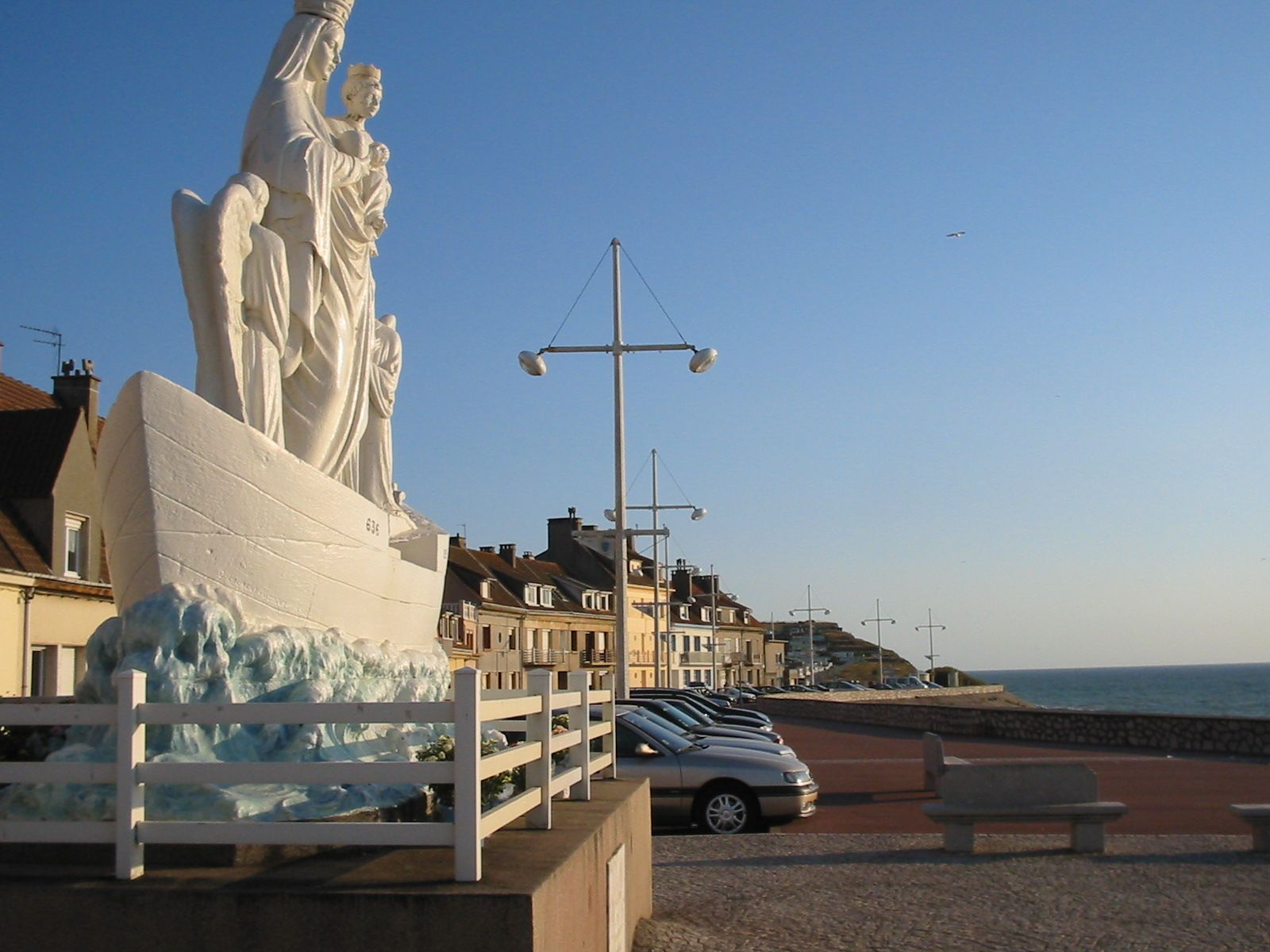
Le Portel: Notre Dame de Boulogne statue

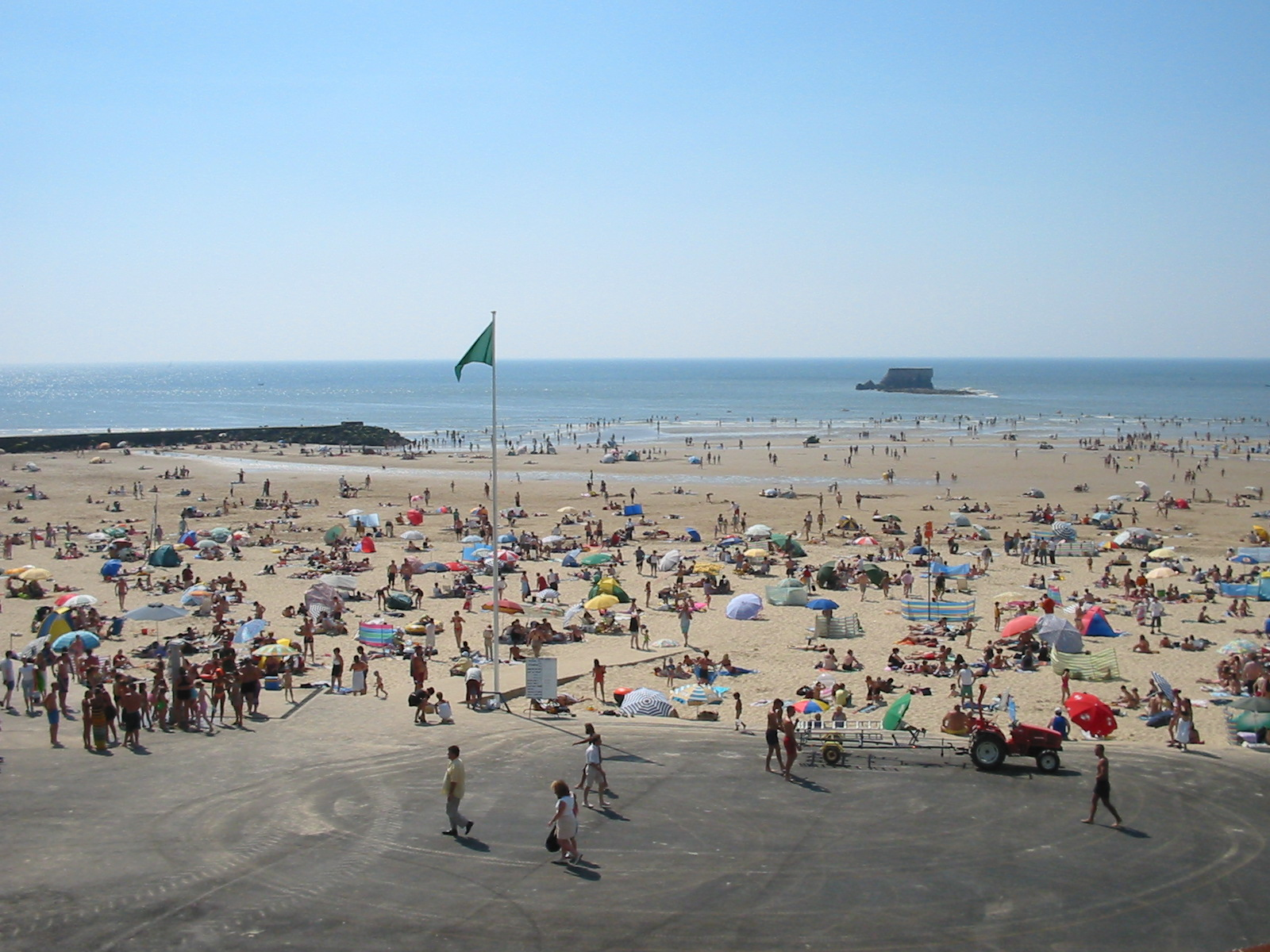
Le Portel: beach with view on the Heurt Fort

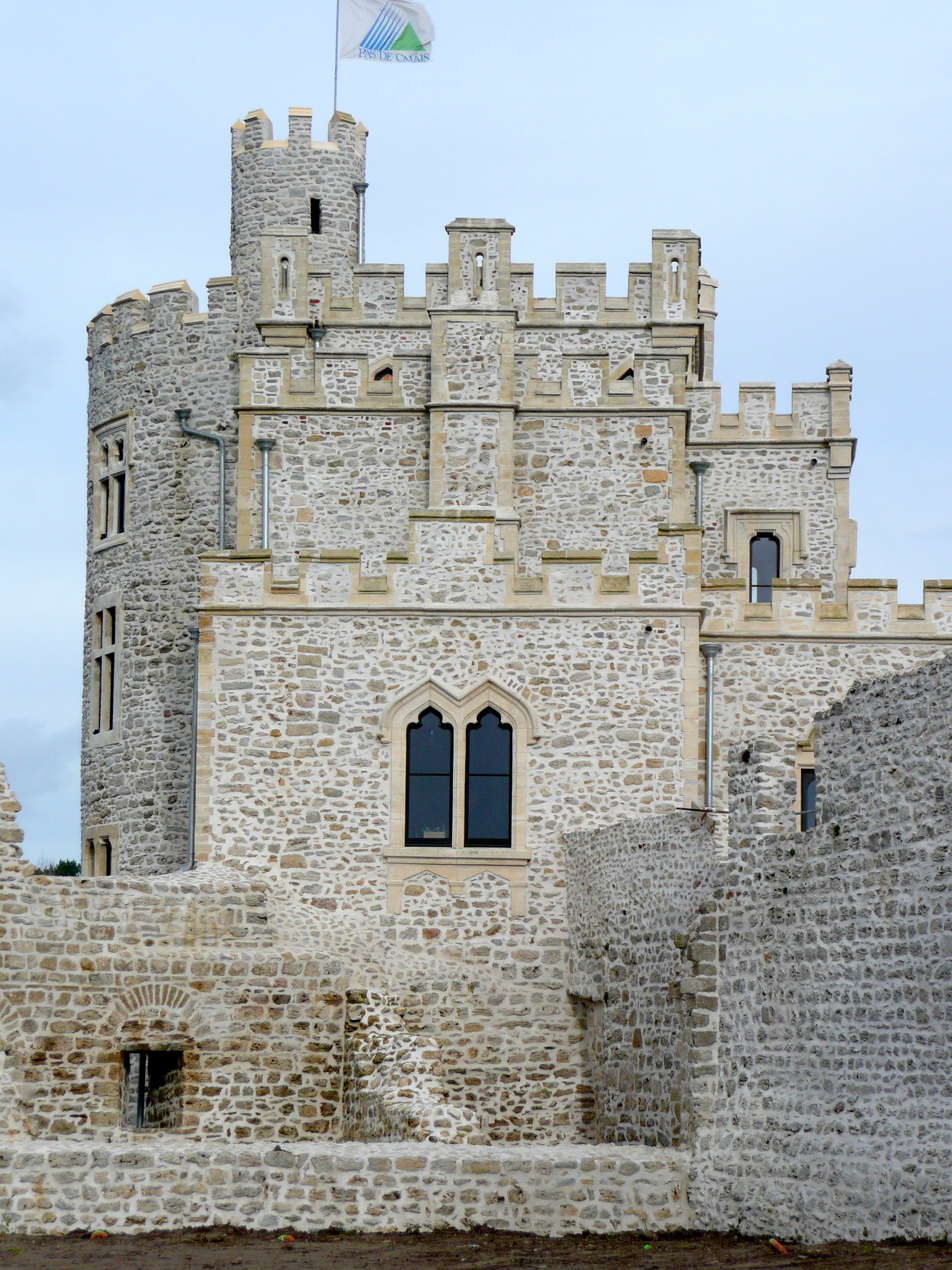
Hardelot Castle

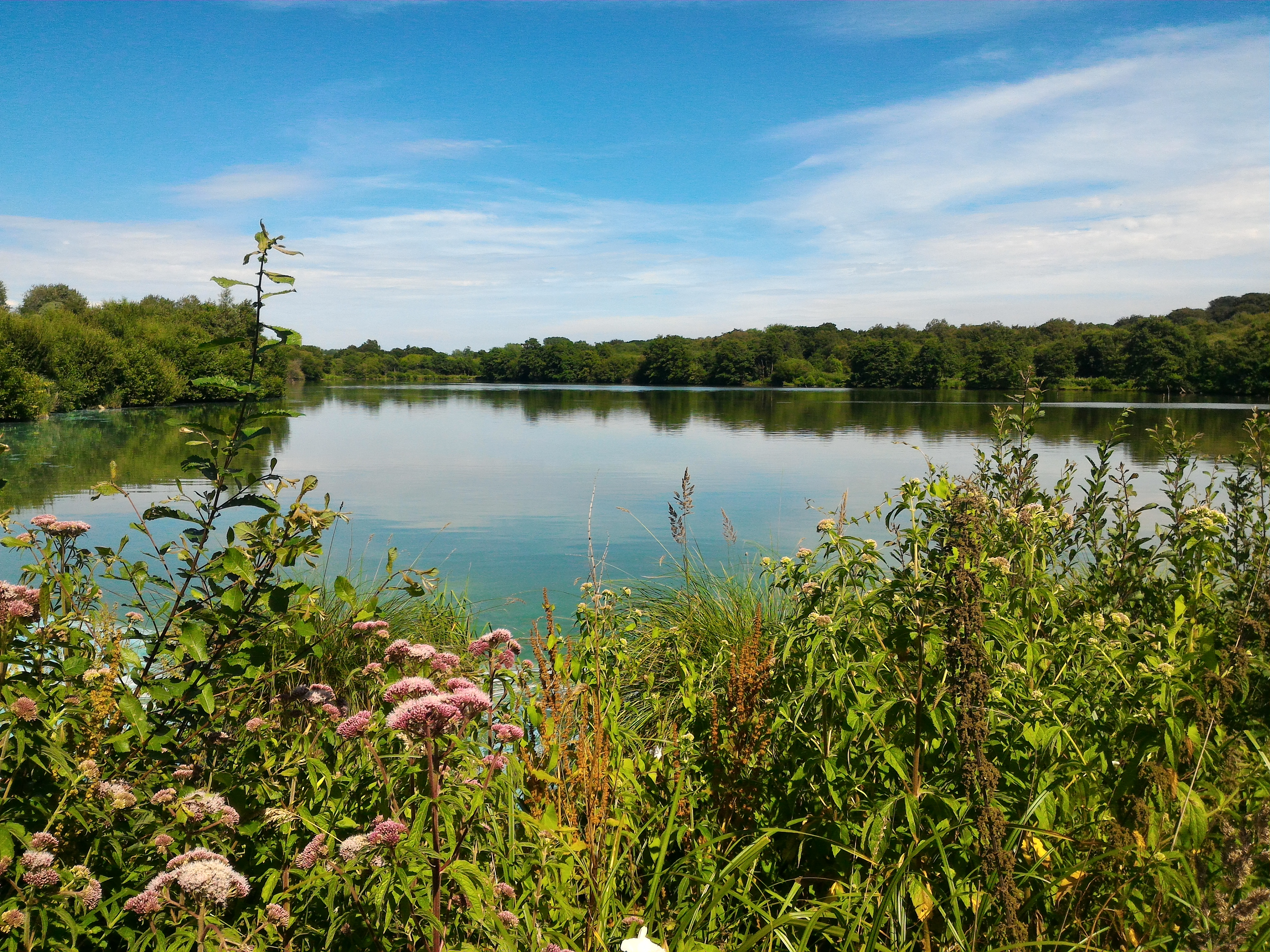
Condette:Mirrors Lake, around the Hardelot Castle
