= Port of Boulogne-sur-Mer =

French port

Boulogne-sur-Mer
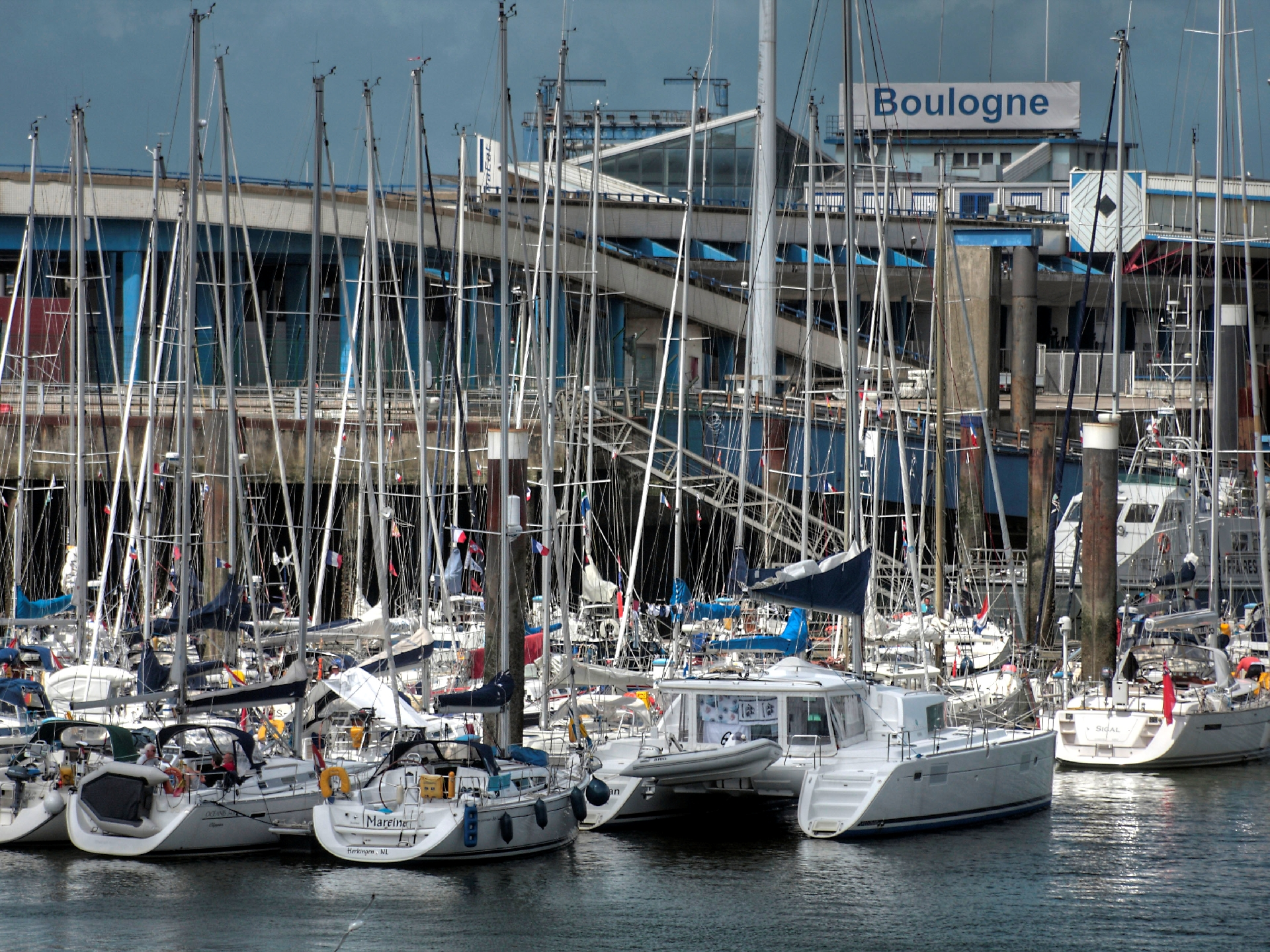
- Boulogne-sur-Mer marina.
- Interactive map of Boulogne-sur-Mer
- Location within France

Location
- Country: France
- Coordinates: 50°43′42″N 1°35′40″E

The Port of Boulogne-sur-Mer is a seaport located on the western coast of the Hauts-de-France region, on the edge of the Pas de Calais, the world's busiest strait for international shipping. It is France's leading fishing port, with a diversified fleet of almost 150 boats. It was also an important link port with England until the end of the 20th century.

It became a “regional port” in 2007 as part of the port decentralization.

== Tidal range ==
Due to the configuration of the Strait, the tidal range (difference in height between high and low tide) in this port is the highest in the region: 8 meters on average at Boulogne-sur-Mer (compared with 5.2 at Dunkirk).

== Port history ==
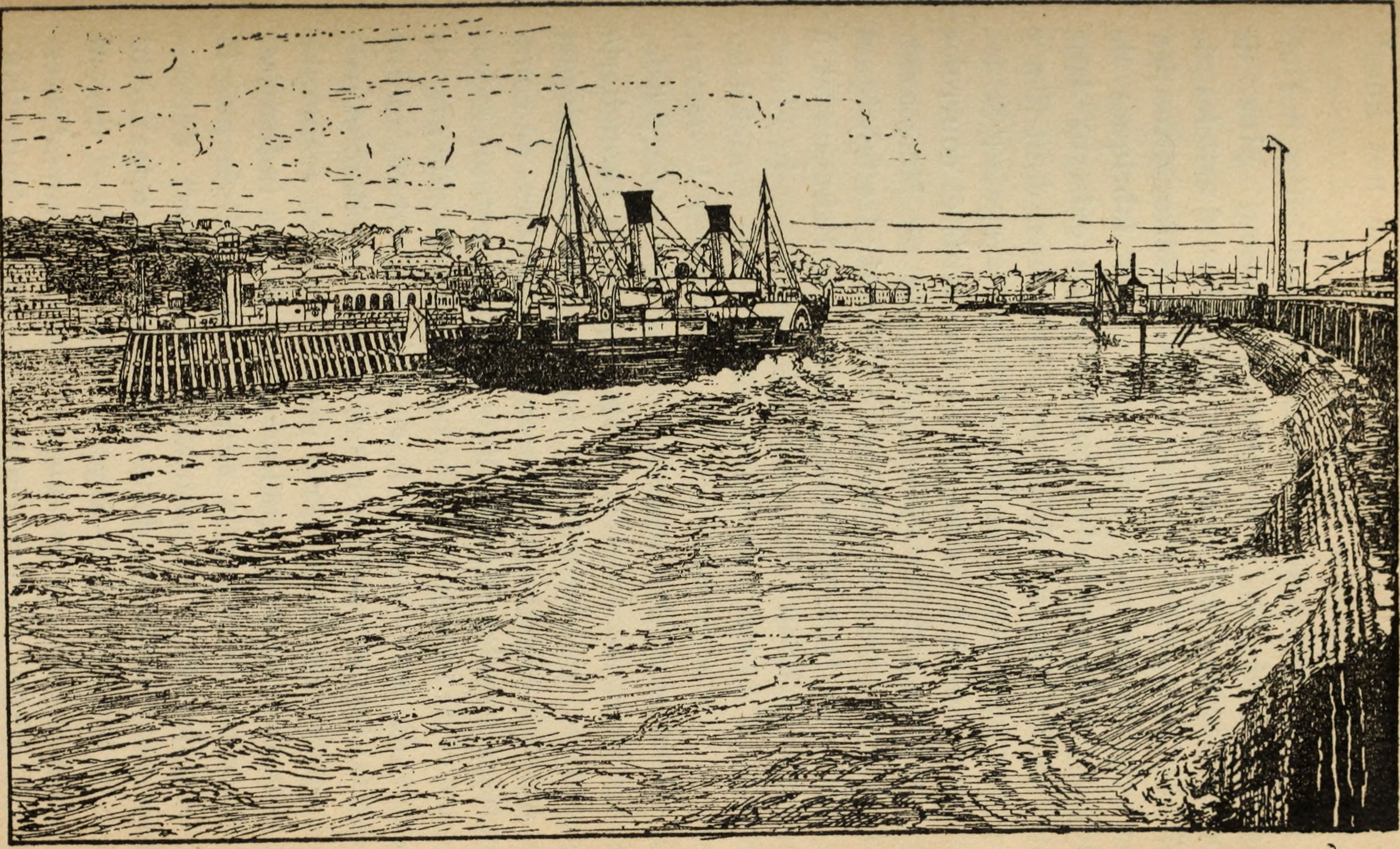
Steam cargo ship and paddlewheel in the port of Boulogne (engraving published in 1920).

This ancient Liane estuary was occupied in prehistoric times, as evidenced by the skulls of prehistoric men (Cro-Magnon, according to their 19th-century discoverers) found in the port of Boulogne.

The port of Boulogne-sur-Mer is one of the former strategic ports of the Pas de Calais and northern France (formerly a military and fishing port), and a departure base for potential landings in France or to England from France.

Legend has it that in the year 633 or 636, during the reign of King Dagobert, a ship without oars or sailors entered the port of Boulogne in unusually calm weather. According to legend, it was illuminated and contained a wooden relief Virgin Mary “of excellent carving, about three and a half feet high, holding the infant Jesus on her left arm, at the origin of a pilgrimage still alive in the 19th century”, according to Abbé Daniel Haigneré. Local tradition also has it that this vessel contained a relic of Christ and another of the Virgin Mary, along with a handwritten Bible, said to have been enshrined by Saint Éloy, Bishop of Noyon. Various illuminations, engravings, seals, etc. have alluded to this religious legend.

In the 18th century, the port of Boulogne was a major center for maritime smuggling with England, known as smogglage or smoglage, particularly for tea, wine and brandy exports.

It also played a role in controlling the level of the Liane, thanks to a lock that became known as the “Pont-Barrage Marguet” lock.

In the 20th century, Boulogne gradually became an industrial and passenger port, as well as a marina, a period during which the port was affected by both world wars. On July 6, 1903, the President of the Republic, Émile Loubet, laid the 1st stone of the tidal basin.

While lighthouses are tending to disappear in Europe, the Boulogne lighthouse is still in operation.

The Quai de l'Europe (800 m), created in 1967, is accessible without a lock to 230-meter ships with 34-foot (11-meter) berths.

The port specializes in forestry/paper products, but has a storage area of almost 500,000 m^{3}, and can also handle cement, aggregates and riprap produced in the Boulonnais region.

It benefits from several motorway access points (A16, A26) but, unlike Calais and Dunkirk, is not connected to the canal network.

Its industrial vocation diminished in 2004 with the closure of the Comilog plant, whose blast furnaces (Note: Comilog is a subsidiary of Eramet, a world-class mining and metallurgical group. The Boulogne plant produced ferromanganese for the steel industry.) had previously contributed significantly to the port's industrial activity. As a result of the plant's closure, the port fell back to 20th place among metropolitan commercial ports (2005 figures).

The freeing-up of the former Comilog plant in October 2007 enabled the Boulogne-sur-Mer Côte d'Opale Chamber of Commerce and Industry, then managing the port, to dispose of part of the land to extend the seafood processing industry zone. The second part, covering some 20 hectares, saw the inauguration on September 19, 2009, of a new freight-passenger terminal featuring a double-deck, double-lane gangway capable of adapting to the width of all types of ship. This new facility can accommodate ships over 200 m long, which make up the bulk of the cross-Channel fleet and the ro-ro fleet in general. It also marks the creation of a “hub port” (so named because it is the meeting point of three modes of transport: sea, road and rail), the initial aim of which was to develop freight services for the seafood industry, enabling the loyalty and development of foreign fish deliveries to Boulogne. Indeed, every year, 85% of the 380,000 tonnes of seafood products shipped to the Port of Boulogne are imported by road. Shipments from Boulogne to Southern Europe are made in the same way.

The port also boasts a shipbuilding business, Socarenam.

The port, which covers a total area of almost 820 hectares in the communes of Boulogne, Le Portel and Outreau, remains France's leading fishing port.

Pedestrians at the port, about 1910

== The Marguet Dam Bridge ==
Located in Place Frédéric-Sauvage, Pont-Barrage Marguet takes its name from the engineer Pierre Joseph Marguet (1785-1870), who designed it (with Peyronnet) in the mid-19th century. It was rebuilt in the mid-20th century.

It replaces a “service bridge” and replaced the old lock that was located further downstream at the beginning of the 19th century Album monumental et archéologie, based on a project drawn up in 1845 by P.J. Marguet, and was inaugurated by Napoleon III himself on September 28, 1853. It was restored between 1955 and 1958, following a bridge collapse in May 1955, and re-inaugurated in June 1959.

This dam plays an important role as a gateway to the sea, via the Frédéric Sauvage reservoir. Conversely, it also helps to conserve water in the Liane during low-water periods, perhaps by reducing the risk of nocturnal asphyxia of fish in a context of eutrophication and anoxia. This dam on the liana has limited the effects of flushing, which is a source of worsening siltation in the port. De-silting operations are periodically necessary.

It is designed to limit the introduction of tides into the lower Liane valley and within the Boulogne-sur-mer urban area; it evacuates floods (at ebb tide or if the level of the Liane is higher than that of the sea). By regulating the water level in the marina (upstream of the dam), it facilitates yachting and other nautical activities.

The “central pass” of the Marguet dam used to have a fixed section, which was replaced in the 2000s by a double gate to increase the speed of flood discharge when necessary (the maximum discharge rate of the river during low-water periods was tripled). However, its opening has little influence on flood discharge upstream of Boulogne-sur-mer (Wirwignes...). It is considered a major obstacle to the upstream migration of migratory fish, yet the Liane is home to a very large eel population.

== Fishing port ==
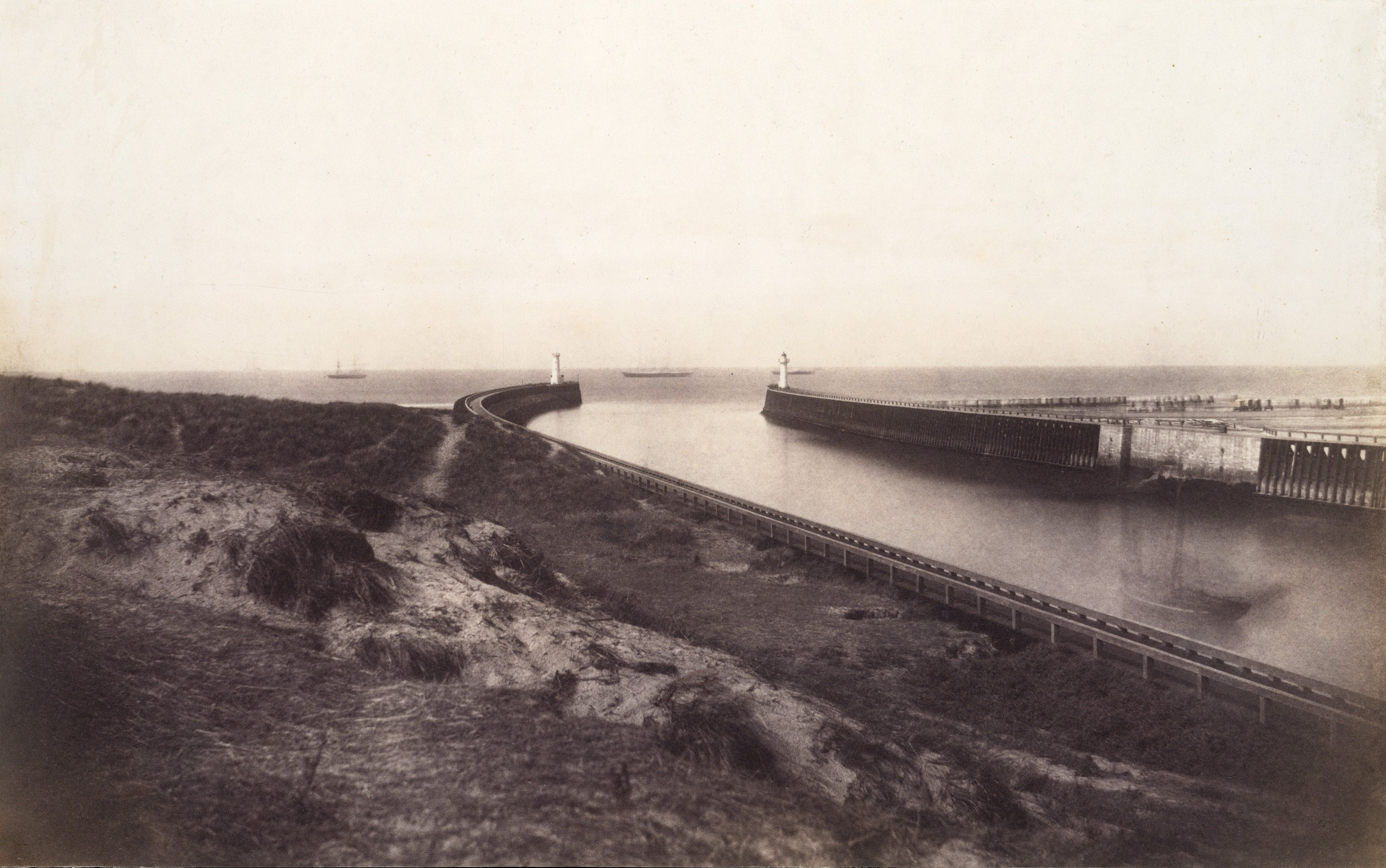
Entrée au Port de Boulogne (1855), by Édouard Baldus.

From the 1850s onwards, industrial fishing in Boulogne was organized around a few shipowning families. By 1868, more than half of all drifters were owned by 4 fishing companies: Vidor, Huret-Dupuis, Bouclet and Ancel-Joly. These pioneers developed the industry considerably, drawing inspiration from the English model. In 1894, Bouclet and then Vidor acquired the first steam-powered herring boats. As a result, steam-powered herring boats were no longer produced from 1905 onwards.

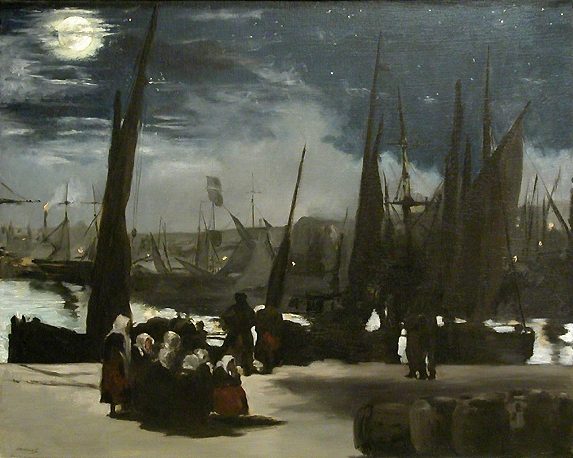
Clair de lune sur le port de Boulogne (1869), by Édouard Manet.

At the beginning of the 20th century, Boulogne was France's leading port in terms of tonnage landed. Herring made its fortune, with over 30,000 tonnes landed in 1921 (equivalent to fifty million francs at the time). These herring were netted in the English Channel/North Sea from July to the end of January by Boulonnais drifters, and also fished by trawlers sent to the Small's region, south-west of Ireland and west of the Bristol Channel, from July to December.

To supply its salting and curing plants all year round, the Boulogne herring industry nevertheless had to import herring from abroad (mainly Norway) to meet its needs (particularly from August to February, with, for example, in 1924, 185 tons of fresh herring in ice and 8,575 tons of salted herring imported between January 1 and August 31, 1924, for Boulogne and Fécamp).

In Boulogne, as elsewhere in Europe, small-scale fishing from the late 19th century onwards, followed by industrial fishing, had to cope with the depletion of certain fish stocks as a result of overfishing, and probably later exacerbated by global warming and pollution.

After record Norwegian herring catches (in 1919, an exceptional year, 4,861,556 hectoliters of herring were landed and sold in Norway, worth 78,731,889 kroner), at the request of the “Syndicat des Armateurs boulonnais”, experts were sent to study Norwegian fishing techniques, and the possibility of Boulonnais herring fishermen going to Norway to fish on the Viking Bank (with drift nets or tidal nets). (Note: Paris (this is the report of a mission to study fishing techniques in Norway, carried out at the request of the “Syndicat des Armateurs boulonnais” to study the possibility for the Boulonnais herring industry to fish herring directly in Norway instead of importing it).Office scientifique et technique de pêches maritimes. Série spéciale. Ed Blondel La Rougerie.)

Today, optimizing the value of catches, diversifying the use of wild resources and developing aquaculture are among the themes addressed by the Aquimer national competitiveness cluster.

In 2008, 47,000 tonnes of fish were landed (-5.7% on 2007), including 37,309 tonnes landed at port (valued at around 83 million euros) and 10,075 tonnes processed at sea by three Euronor freezer trawlers. This decrease can be explained in part by the decommissioning of one of Euronor's six fresh fishing boats, by the protection of spawning stocks (cod quotas) and by the “biological stoppages” of part of the fleet in summer and winter 2008. However, at the end of 2008, the European Fisheries Ministers granted a 30% increase in cod catches in the North Sea and Eastern Channel, where trawlers from Boulonnais are active, and fishermen are allowed to keep dead fish that are undersized or not authorized for fishing, but in exchange fishermen must limit their days at sea (from 180 to 150 days).

In 2010, almost 45,000 tonnes of fish were counted, including 35,964 tonnes landed at the port and 8,934 tonnes frozen at sea (Euronor).

In November 2008, the regional council announced the creation of a fishing mission with “an audit for the Port of Boulogne's fishing platform strategy for the next 10 to 15 years”.

In 2009, a “Capécure-Bis” was set up on 14 ha (out of a total of 40) of the former Comilog industrial wasteland (the plant was closed in December 2003). These installations have been delayed by 6 months due to the extra time needed to clean up the Comilog site.

Between 2000 and 2013, the fishing port will benefit from a €35 million modernization program. In both cases, High Environmental Quality criteria are announced, as well as a green corridor on the activity zone.

In 2015, the Port of Boulogne remained France's leading fishing port (in terms of tonnage landed) ahead of Lorient, despite a significant decline (50,965 tons in 2001, 43,952 tons in 2006, 36,096 tons in 2012 and 35,850 tons in 2015).

In 2020, the Port of Boulogne was France's leading fishing port, with a tonnage of 27,859 tonnes.

=== Quantity of fish caught in the port of Boulogne-sur-Mer (in tonnes) ===
According to the portboulognecalais website, in 2023 the fishing port of Boulogne-sur-Mer had 89.1 millions of euros in value terms (up 2%), it has even reached its highest level for 20 years for the second year running. Fish volumes are up by 8% compared with 2022, and have passed the symbolic 30,000 tonnes threshold (30,437 t), returning to their pre-Brexit level. The drop in catches of certain species such as sole, mackerel and whiting has been offset by ever greater volumes of cephalopods (squid and cuttlefish), red mullet and scallops, whose stocks are in excellent condition. The port of Boulogne-sur-Mer remains the leading French fishing port in terms of tonnage and value.

== Cross-Channel port ==
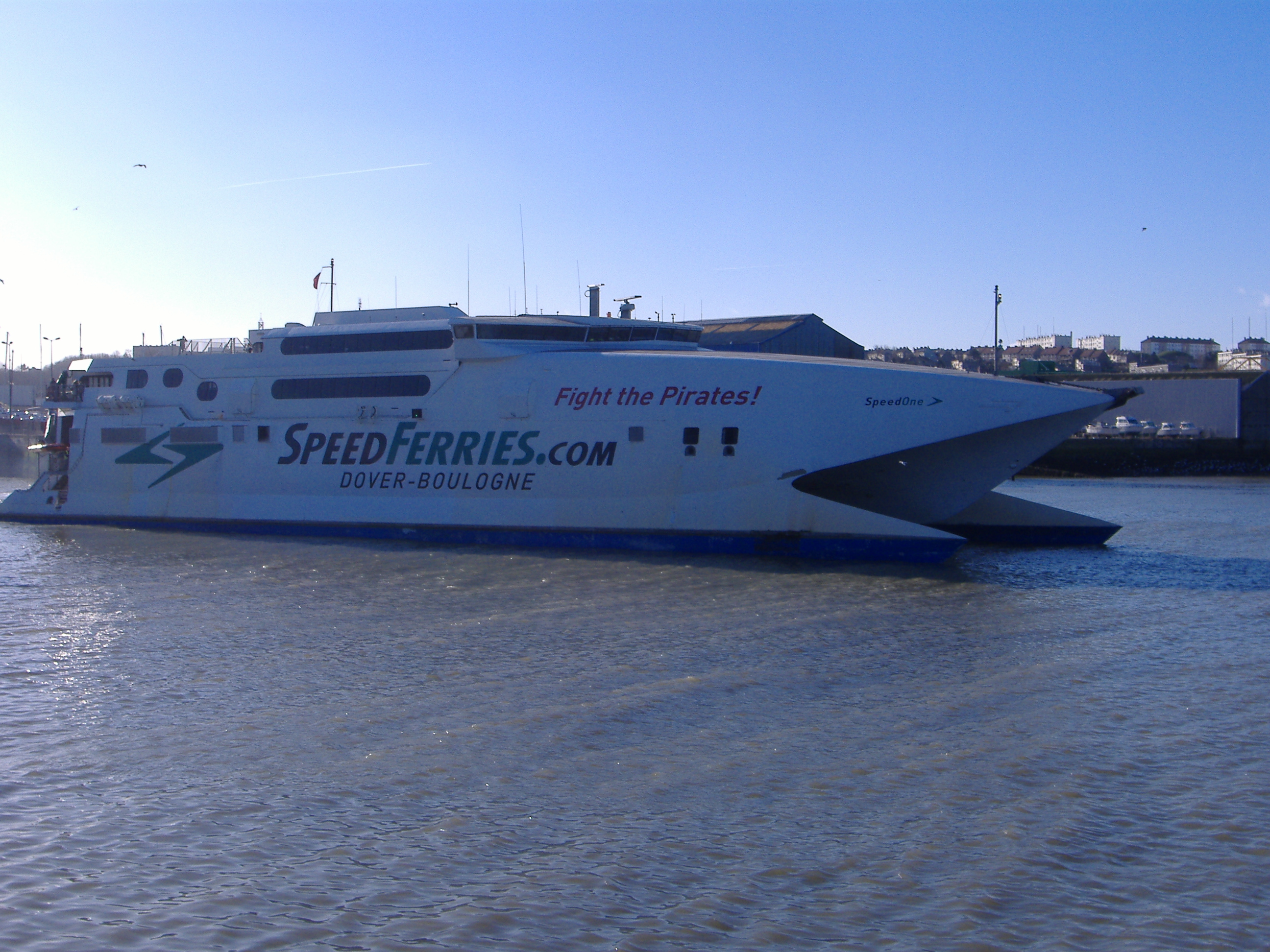
A ferry to England in the port of Boulogne in 2008.

Boulogne's ideal geographical position made it a major port for links with England. In the 13th century, the first commercial link with England was established in Boulogne. From the eighteenth century onwards, numerous passenger services across the Channel were launched in Boulogne, so that by 1913, Boulogne had a monopoly on cross-Channel transport over Calais, and was France's leading passenger port. Until the 1990s, Boulogne was the 2nd largest passenger port in France.

But the construction of the Channel Tunnel and the development of the port of Calais at the end of the 20th century led to a decline in traffic at the port of Boulogne, and the gradual closure of the lines orchestrated by the various cross-Channel operators, who preferred to focus their efforts on the Calais-Dover line.

For a few years, the port of Boulogne still handled a significant flow of passengers to England. In May 2004, SpeedFerries launched the world's 1st low-cost fast ferry service from Boulogne. Traffic reached 710,000 passengers in 2007. However, the company was forced to cease operations in November 2008. In February 2009, LD Lines reactivated the Boulogne-Dover route with a traditional ferry: the “Côte d'Albâtre”. From June to November 2009, LD Lines operated its fast catamaran “Norman Arrow” on this route. In November, this vessel was replaced by the “Norman Spirit”, a slower conventional ferry offering higher freight capacity. In March 2010, following a commercial agreement with Transeuropa Ferries, LD Lines made another change of vessel, with the “Norman Bridge” operating a mixed freight-passenger service. In May 2010, this service was reinforced by a second identical vessel, the “Norman Trader”, for a few months, until early September 2010, when LD Lines finally ceased its cross-Channel activities at Boulogne. Since then, except in exceptional circumstances, no passenger ships have operated between Boulogne and England, but there is still hope that the link will soon be revived.

The Port of Boulogne has three main cross-Channel terminals:

- the Gare Maritime, the main ferry terminal to England, in operation between 1875 and 2009;
- the Boulogne hoverport, which between 1968 and 1991 enabled cross-Channel travel by hovercraft, faster than traditional ferries (25 minutes from Boulogne to Dover);
- the hub port, built in 2009 to replace the ferry terminal, but virtually unused until the Boulogne cross-Channel link was discontinued.

== Hoverport ==
In 1968 a hoverport was built to service the Seaspeed hovercraft operation from Dover Hoverport. A major reconstruction took place in 1978, in anticipation of larger passenger number stemming from the rebuild of the SR.N4 hovercraft and introduction of the N.500 Naviplane hovercraft. The hoverport closed when Hoverspeed abandoned their Boulogne hovercraft service to focus on their SeaCat service in 1993 and remains in situ, albeit in a derelict condition.

== Commercial port ==
Ranked 10th largest commercial port in mainland France in 1960, and 9th in 1990, the closure of Comilog's blast furnaces in 2004 brought the port's volume of business to a halt. Indeed, almost 58% of Boulogne's port activity was directly linked to Comilog's industrial activity. As a result, the commercial port of Boulogne-sur-Mer slipped to 20th place in 2005. In 2010, the port's total commercial traffic amounted to 1,755,164 tonnes, thanks in particular to the cross-Channel activity of LD Lines.

== Marina ==
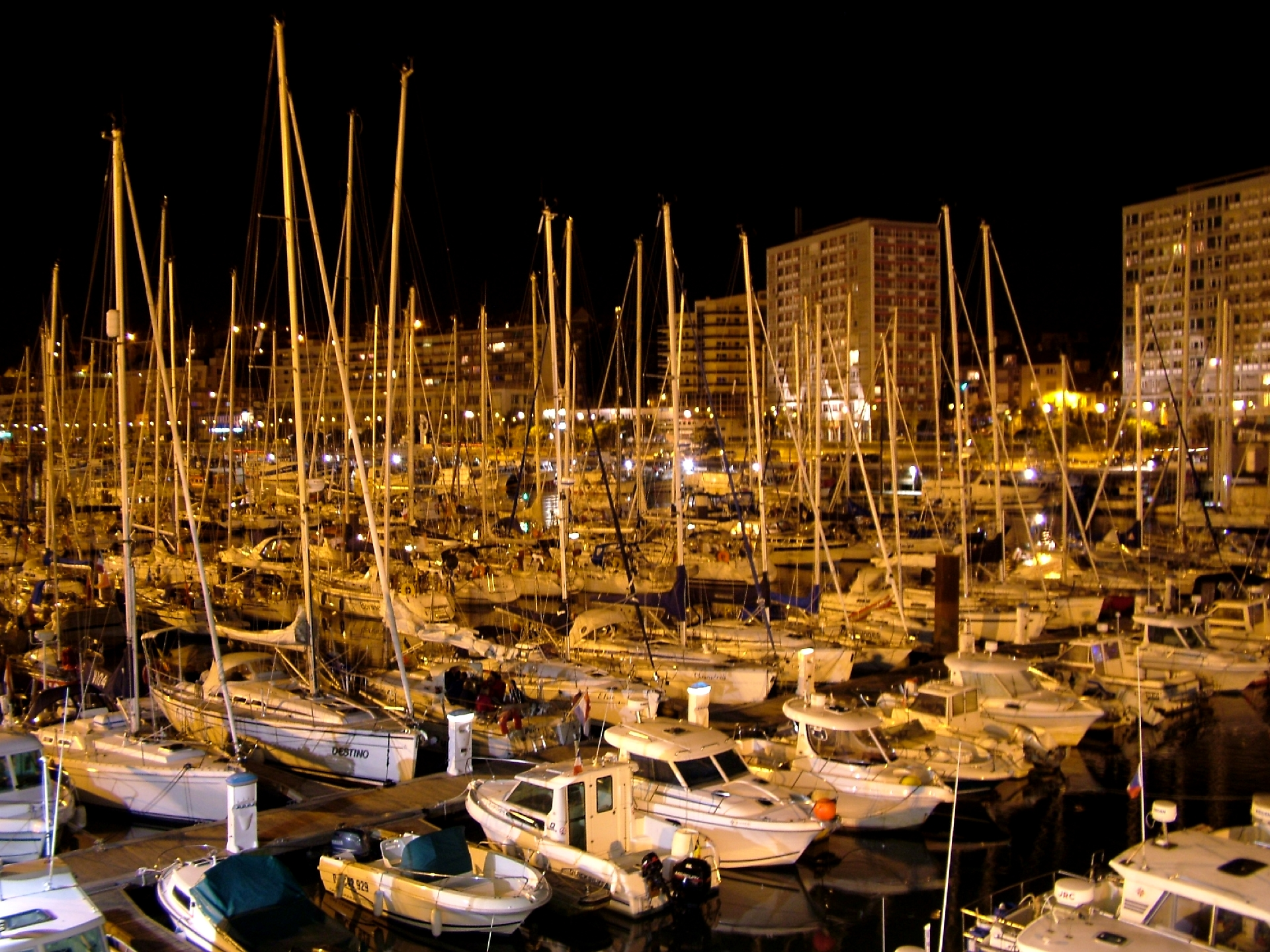
The marina by night.

The Boulogne marina, managed by the Chambre de Commerce et Littoral Hauts-de-France, is located in the eastern part of the port and has 590 berths in three basins (108 in the outer harbor, including 70 for visitors, 202 in the inner harbor, and 280 in the Bassin Napoléon). It can accommodate all types of pleasure craft, including sailboats up to 25 m long. A Club House welcomes yachtsmen. At the end of 2017, the Bassin Napoléon underwent major renovation work, financed by the Communauté d'Agglomération du Boulonnais, with new pontoons and berths available since May 2018.

The harbor is equipped with 10-meter catways and 2 22-meter long berths for larger boats. Fuel (diesel-gasoil) is available on the port itself, quai Chanzy (diesel pump open 3 h before and 3 h after high tide during office hours), as well as fresh water and electricity (220 V/16 A). A wastewater pumping station is also available, on a pontoon. A 35-tonne gantry crane operated by S.E.P.D. (Société d'Exploitation des Ports du Détroit) handles launching and lifting operations. The port has a free 'Boulogne Marina' wi-fi system, and provides weather forecasts, waste sorting facilities and WC/shower facilities.

In October 2017, the marina was equipped with an automatic defibrillator located outside the reception building, as well as 6 carts distributed across the 3 basins to enable boaters to transport their equipment. Bicycle racks were also installed in July 2018 to meet boater demand.

In summer 2018, new services are being offered to subscribers and visitors such as the bread/viennoiserie service at the foot of the port office between July 10 and August 17, 2018, as well as numerous partnerships with downtown bakeries, restaurants and delicatessens in the form of discounts or benefits by presenting the port membership card.

A multilingual (French-English-Dutch) website boulogne-marina.fr has also been created, as well as a facebook page 'Marina Boulogne sur Mer' where all the latest marina news can be found.

== Visitor numbers ==
In 2017, the port welcomed 2,740 visitors for 7,377 overnight stays, with the majority of customers being Dutch, Belgian, English, German and French.

== Security ==
High-speed vessels are known to pose water safety problems by crossing the “rail” at high speed, and therefore with high kinetic energy. Highly fuel-intensive, their speed could be limited in the future by the price of oil.

=== Seismic risk ===
Seismic risk is low in Boulogne (zone 2 out of 5 in the zoning established in May 2011), as in most of Nord-Pas-de-Calais. However, a seismogenic fault exists in Belgium, parallel to the Franco-Belgian border. Historically, several major earthquakes appear to have had an epicenter in the Pas de Calais region, between France and England. These include the earthquake of April 6, 1580, which affected Boulogne-sur-Mer and Calais, as well as a small tsunami which is also thought to have affected ships at sea, but in this region, which has suffered many wars, there is little precise evidence of this period. More recently, on September 19, 1810, a small tsunami also hit the port of Boulogne-sur-Mer, assessed by the BRGM as a grade 3 tsunami, of fairly high intensity, which could cause flooding of gently sloping coasts, damage to light constructions near the coast or reversal of watercourses in estuaries up to a certain distance upstream.

== Management authority ==
The former Nord-Pas-de-Calais region became the new owner of the Port of Boulogne on January 1, 2007, as part of a process of port decentralization.

In 2009, it decided to entrust the management and development of the yachting sector to the local authorities (town or CAB).

The other port facilities continue to be operated by the CCI, which became the new Côte d'Opale Chamber of Commerce and Industry on January 1, 2011.

== Environment ==
Comilog is a subsidiary of Eramet, a world-class mining and metallurgical group. The Boulogne plant produced ferromanganese for the steel industry. It also has direct and indirect or delayed environmental effects (for example, for currentological and hydrosedimentary reasons, the discharge of sediments into the sea, and the extension of the harbour jetty in the early 1970s may also have played a role in accelerating shoreline erosion at Wissant (Clabaut, 1988, cited by Aernouts (2006)), was once home to a polluting industry (the Comilog plant), and like all ports, it contributes to greenhouse gas emissions and the spread of invasive species worldwide (for example, the first appearance of the crepidula in the northern Seine estuary was reported here). In the past, the company may well have contributed to the ecotoxicity of port sediments, with delayed effects when port sediments cleaned in the harbour were dumped at sea off Boulogne. Its beach has long been considered the most polluted in France (and high levels of metals, including mercury, have been recorded in the port in the past). Water and sediment quality should improve with the closure and treatment of the Comilog wasteland and work on the wastewater treatment plant.

In 1988, 50% of the poor-quality bathing waters in mainland France were located in the Nord-Pas-de-Calais region. Significant efforts have enabled us to achieve 100% compliance in 10 years, with a few black spots still remaining after rainfall (overflow from wastewater treatment plants), which explains why the beach near the port of Boulogne-sur-Mer is closed to bathing.

The port is equipped with wind turbines, and Nausicaa helps to raise visitor awareness of the marine environment.

== Tourism ==
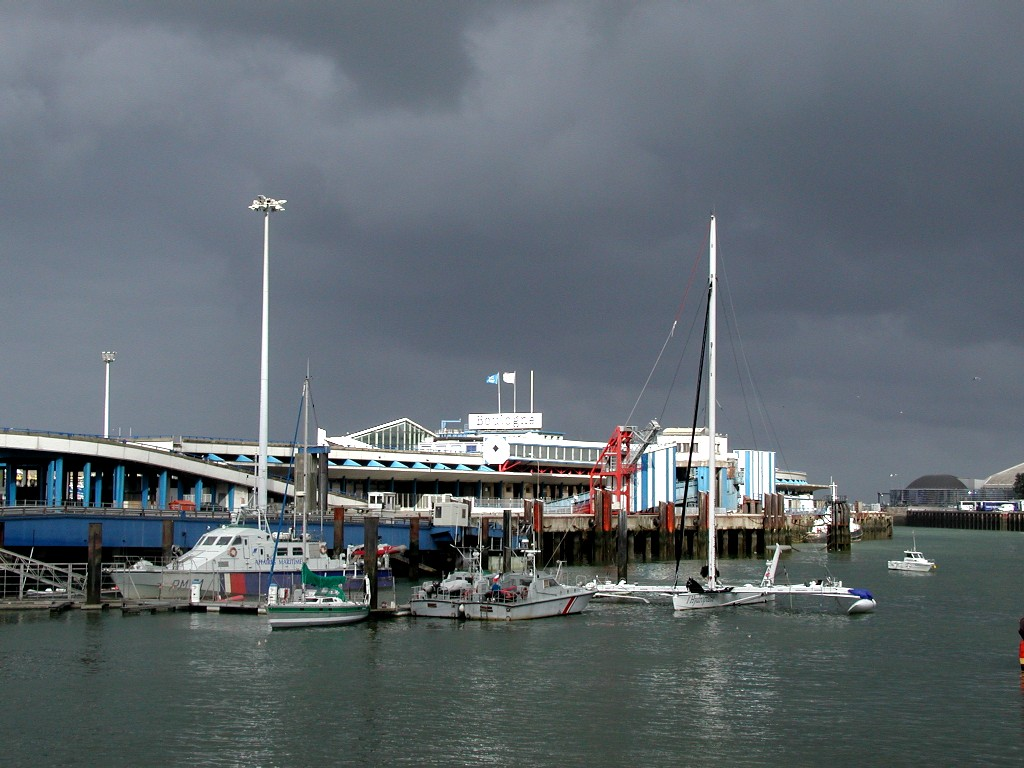
The Tabarly hydrofoil, in the port of Boulogne-sur-Mer.

Having depended in particular on passenger transport (currently at a standstill since September 2010), tourism in the Port of Boulogne remains linked to the success of Nausicaá, the region's leading tourist site, and to the tourist appeal of the town and its surrounding area (the beaches of the Côte d'Opale, the Haute Ville, the château-museum, the Napoleonic Column of the Grande Armée, the regional nature park) and the Fête de la mer de Boulogne-sur-Mer.

== Industry ==
It is essentially linked to the valorization of fish products. The 4 main species fished in 2006 were (according to the CCI Boulogne and the CCIBCO):

- Whiting; 5,476 tonnes, +9.4% on 2005
- Mackerel; 4,117 tonnes, -5% on 2005
- Herring; 5,100 tonnes, +29% on 2005
- Saithe; 6,423 tonnes, +107.8% on 2005

The DRIRE reports only one plant, Société Maritime de Combustible Liquides de Boulogne-sur-Mer (SMCL) classified as Sévéso - seuil bas (for fire risks).

== Prospects ==
In 2007, the CCI would like to create

- a Freight Hub port terminal;
- a logistics platform;
- a accompanied combined transport terminal to complement the existing rail platform.

In a global context of climate change, managers will have to deal with a probable rise in sea levels, and an increased risk of high tides and storms. A tide gauge has been measuring tide levels in Boulogne for many years. The Marel Carno Station (automatic) monitors a number of parameters of the marine environment, including;

- (3 times/hour): water and air temperature, conductivity (salinity), dissolved oxygen, pH, fluorescence (chlorophyll), turbidity, relative humidity and radiation available for photosynthesis (P.A.R.).
- every 12 h (since recently): measurement of nitrate, silicate and phosphate levels

It is to be integrated into the Mersea project (Marine Environment and Security for the European Area), which is a global ocean observation, modeling and forecasting system set up for 4 years (2004-2008) by federating the efforts of 40 European institutes and agencies.

As oil prices inevitably rise, the fishing and port industries will have to find alternatives to this energy source. Some are talking about a return to sailing, but in a modernized version, or new engines (using hydrogen or solar energy), or even various fishing adaptations to be developed around a more sustainable management of fishery resources, which we are seeking to better understand with organizations such as Ifremer, universities...).

== See also ==
- Boulonnais (land area)
- Boulogne-sur-Mer
- Strait of Dover
- MARPOL 73/78
- Sieges of Boulogne (1544–1546)
- Cuisine and specialties of Nord-Pas-de-Calais

== Bibliography ==
- Doussin, JM (1953). Le port de Boulogne. société de géographie de Lille.
- Le Bourdellès, H (2009). Boulogne et Thérouanne au temps de César: approche toponymique de la cité des Morins. Presses Univ. Septentrion.
- Oustric, G (1995). Le port de Boulogne-sur-Mer au xixe siècle. Éd. le Téméraire.
- Dardel, E (1927). Le port de Boulogne depuis la guerre. Annales de Géographie.
- Dhainaut-Courtois; Pruvot, N.; Empis A., C; Baudet, K. (2000). Les peuplements macrozoobenthiques, indicateurs des qualités physico-chimiques et chimiques des sédiments portuaires: Exemple du port de Boulogne-sur-Mer (Manche). Bulletin de la Société zoologique de France.
- Giard, A (1888). Le port de Boulogne Le laboratoire de Wimereux en 1888.
- Gobert-Sergent, Yann (preface de Frédéric Cuvillier) (2004). Pêche, course et contrebandiers. Le port de Boulogne-sur-mer de Louis XIV à Napoléon Ier (1680-1815). ACRB éditions.
- d'Hauttefeuille, A; Bénard, L (1860). Boulogne-sur-Mer.
- Lottin, A (1998). Histoire de Boulogne-sur-Mer. Éditions Le Téméraire.
- Meuriot, E; Gilly, B (1987). Comment se forment les prix du poisson au débarquement ? Analyse du cas des espèces démersales en France entre 1974 et 1983.
