= Quesques =

Quesques Kesseke
- Commune
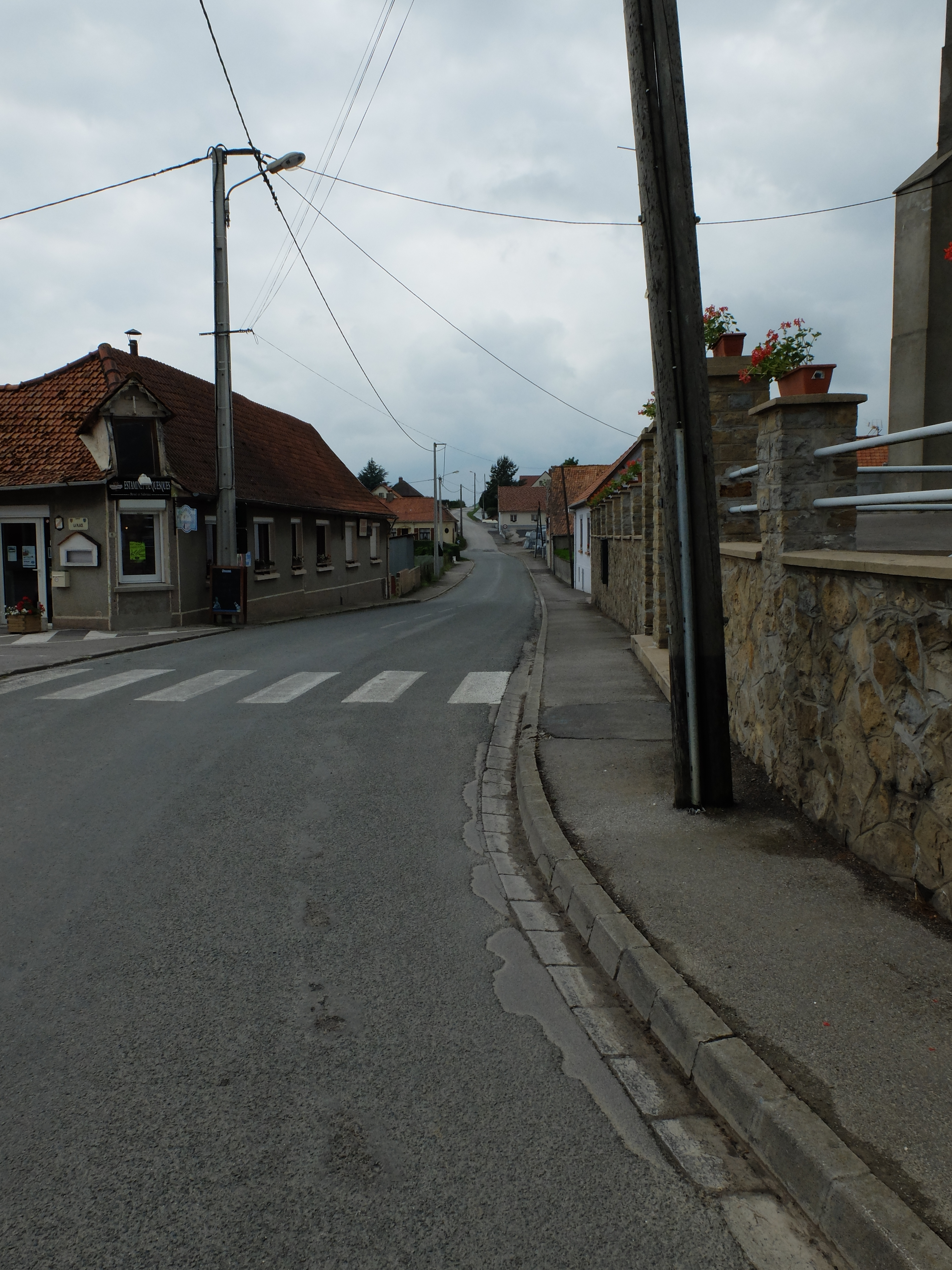
- The main road of Quesques

- Coat of arms
- Location of Quesques
- Location within France Location within Hauts-de-France
- Coordinates: 50°42′15″N 1°56′01″E
- Country: France
- Region: Hauts-de-France
- Department: Pas-de-Calais
- Arrondissement: Boulogne-sur-Mer
- Canton: Desvres
- Intercommunality: CC Desvres-Samer

Government
  - Mayor (2020–2026): Paul Saint Maxent
- Area^{1}: 13.73 km^{2} (5.30 sq mi)
- Elevation: 101 m (331 ft)
- Highest elevation: 211 m (692 ft)
- Lowest elevation: 67 m (220 ft)
- Population (2023): 720
  - Density: 52/km^{2} (140/sq mi)
- Time zone: UTC+01:00 (CET)
  - Summer (DST): UTC+02:00 (CEST)
- INSEE/Postal code: 62678 /62240
- ^{1} French Land Register data, which excludes lakes, ponds, glaciers > 1 km^{2} (0.386 sq mi or 247 acres) and river estuaries.

Quesques (French pronunciation: [kɛk]; West Flemish: Kesseke) is a commune in the Pas-de-Calais department in the Hauts-de-France region of France 12 miles (19 km) east of Boulogne.

== Geography ==
Located in the north of the Pas-de-Calais department, Quesques is a rural commune where the coastal river Liane has its source and is located, as the crow flies, 8 km northeast of the commune of Desvres and 23 km east of the commune of Boulogne-sur-Mer (attraction area and arrondissement capital).

The territory of the commune borders those of seven communes. The bordering communes are Escœuilles, Alquines, Brunembert, Coulomby, Lottinghen, Selles and Seninghem.

== Population ==
Historical population
Year	Pop.	±% p.a.
1968	569	—
1975	542	−0.69%
1982	481	−1.69%
1990	542	+1.50%
1999	559	+0.34%
2007	570	+0.24%
2012	618	+1.63%
2017	676	+1.81%
2023	720	+1.06%
Source: INSEE

== See also ==
- Communes of the Pas-de-Calais department
