= Le Wast =

- Commune
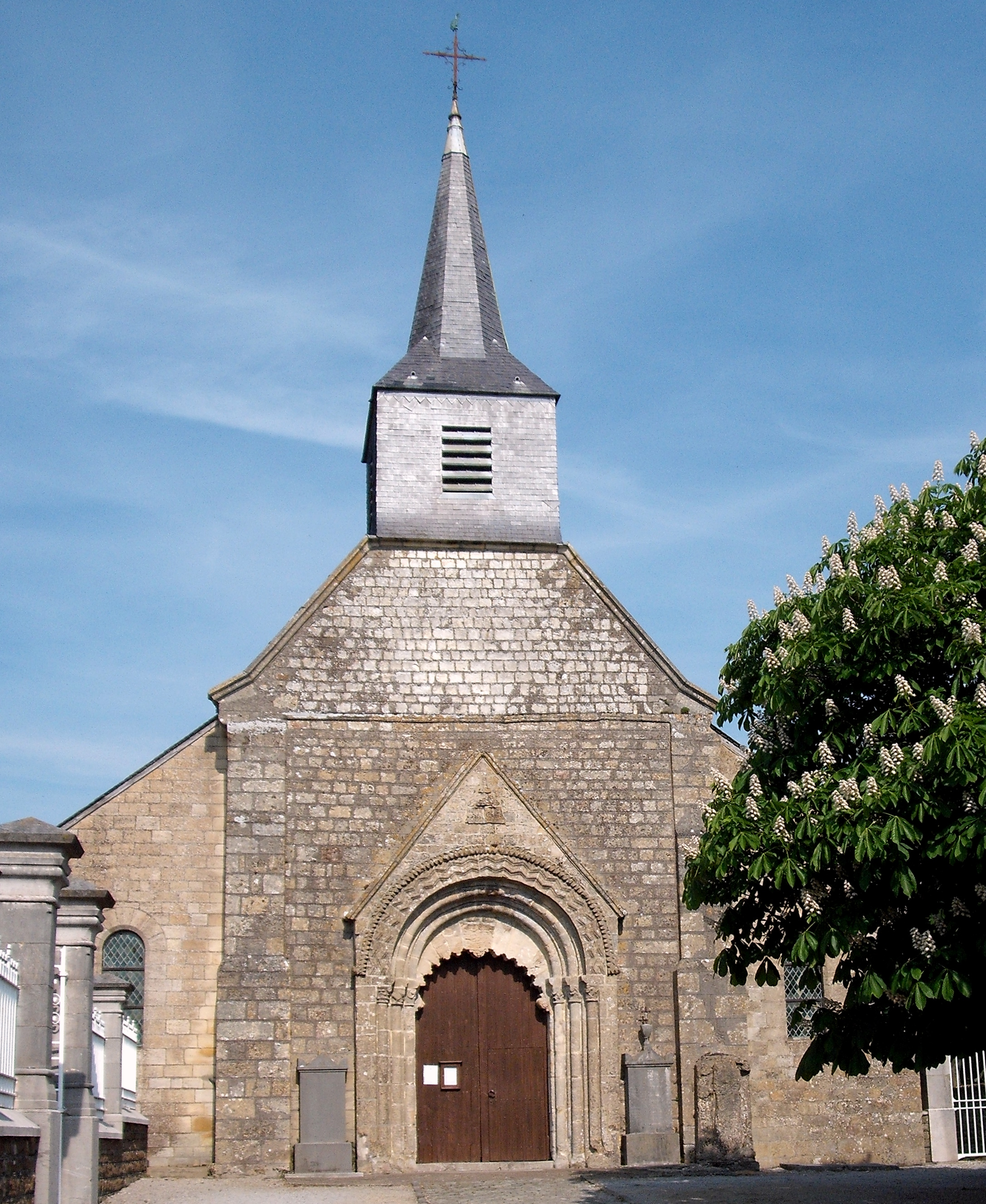
- The church of Le Wast
- Location of Le Wast
- Location within France Location within Hauts-de-France
- Coordinates: 50°44′58″N 1°48′11″E
- Country: France
- Region: Hauts-de-France
- Department: Pas-de-Calais
- Arrondissement: Boulogne-sur-Mer
- Canton: Desvres
- Intercommunality: CC Desvres-Samer

Government
  - Mayor (2020–2026): Philippe Demolliens
- Area^{1}: 0.9 km^{2} (0.35 sq mi)
- Elevation: 52 m (171 ft)
- Highest elevation: 70 m (230 ft)
- Lowest elevation: 42 m (138 ft)
- Population (2023): 203
  - Density: 230/km^{2} (580/sq mi)
- Time zone: UTC+01:00 (CET)
  - Summer (DST): UTC+02:00 (CEST)
- INSEE/Postal code: 62880 /62142
- ^{1} French Land Register data, which excludes lakes, ponds, glaciers > 1 km^{2} (0.386 sq mi or 247 acres) and river estuaries.

Le Wast (French: [lə va]) is a commune in the Pas-de-Calais department in the Hauts-de-France region of France about 8 miles (13 km) east of Boulogne.

== Population ==
Historical population
Year	Pop.	±% p.a.
1968	200	—
1975	195	−0.36%
1982	171	−1.86%
1990	185	+0.99%
1999	180	−0.30%
2007	196	+1.07%
2012	203	+0.70%
2017	206	+0.29%
2023	203	−0.24%
Source: INSEE

== Transport ==
The Chemin de fer de Boulogne à Bonningues (CF de BB) opened a station serving Le Wast and Alincthun on 22 April 1900. Passenger services were withdrawn on 31 December 1935. They were reinstated in November 1942. The CF de BB closed in 1948.

== See also ==
- Communes of the Pas-de-Calais department
