= Lottinghen =

- Commune
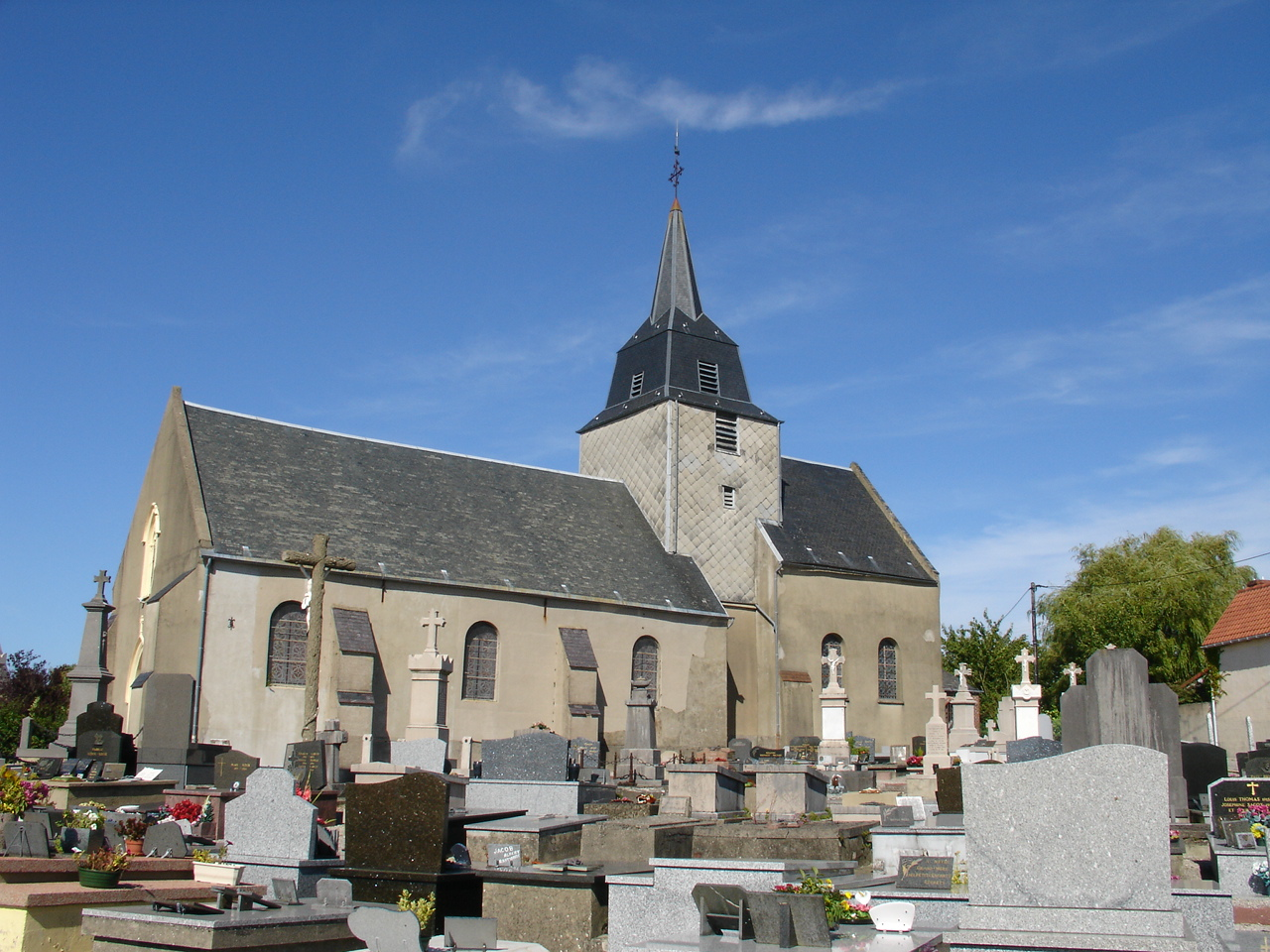
- The church of Lottinghen

- Coat of arms
- Location of Lottinghen
- Location within France Location within Hauts-de-France
- Coordinates: 50°41′05″N 1°56′00″E
- Country: France
- Region: Hauts-de-France
- Department: Pas-de-Calais
- Arrondissement: Boulogne-sur-Mer
- Canton: Desvres
- Intercommunality: CC Desvres-Samer

Government
  - Mayor (2020–2026): André Leleu
- Area^{1}: 10.11 km^{2} (3.90 sq mi)
- Elevation: 163 m (535 ft)
- Highest elevation: 211 m (692 ft)
- Lowest elevation: 68 m (223 ft)
- Population (2023): 544
  - Density: 53.8/km^{2} (139/sq mi)
- Time zone: UTC+01:00 (CET)
  - Summer (DST): UTC+02:00 (CEST)
- INSEE/Postal code: 62530 /62240
- ^{1} French Land Register data, which excludes lakes, ponds, glaciers > 1 km^{2} (0.386 sq mi or 247 acres) and river estuaries.

Lottinghen (French pronunciation: [lɔtɛ̃ɡɑ̃]) is a commune in the Pas-de-Calais department in the Hauts-de-France region of France. about 14 mi east of Boulogne.

== Population ==
Historical population
Year	Pop.	±% p.a.
1968	531	—
1975	527	−0.11%
1982	436	−2.67%
1990	457	+0.59%
1999	464	+0.17%
2007	511	+1.21%
2012	553	+1.59%
2017	545	−0.29%
2023	544	−0.03%
Source: INSEE

== See also ==
- Communes of the Pas-de-Calais department
