= Wirwignes =

Wirwignes Willewine
- Commune
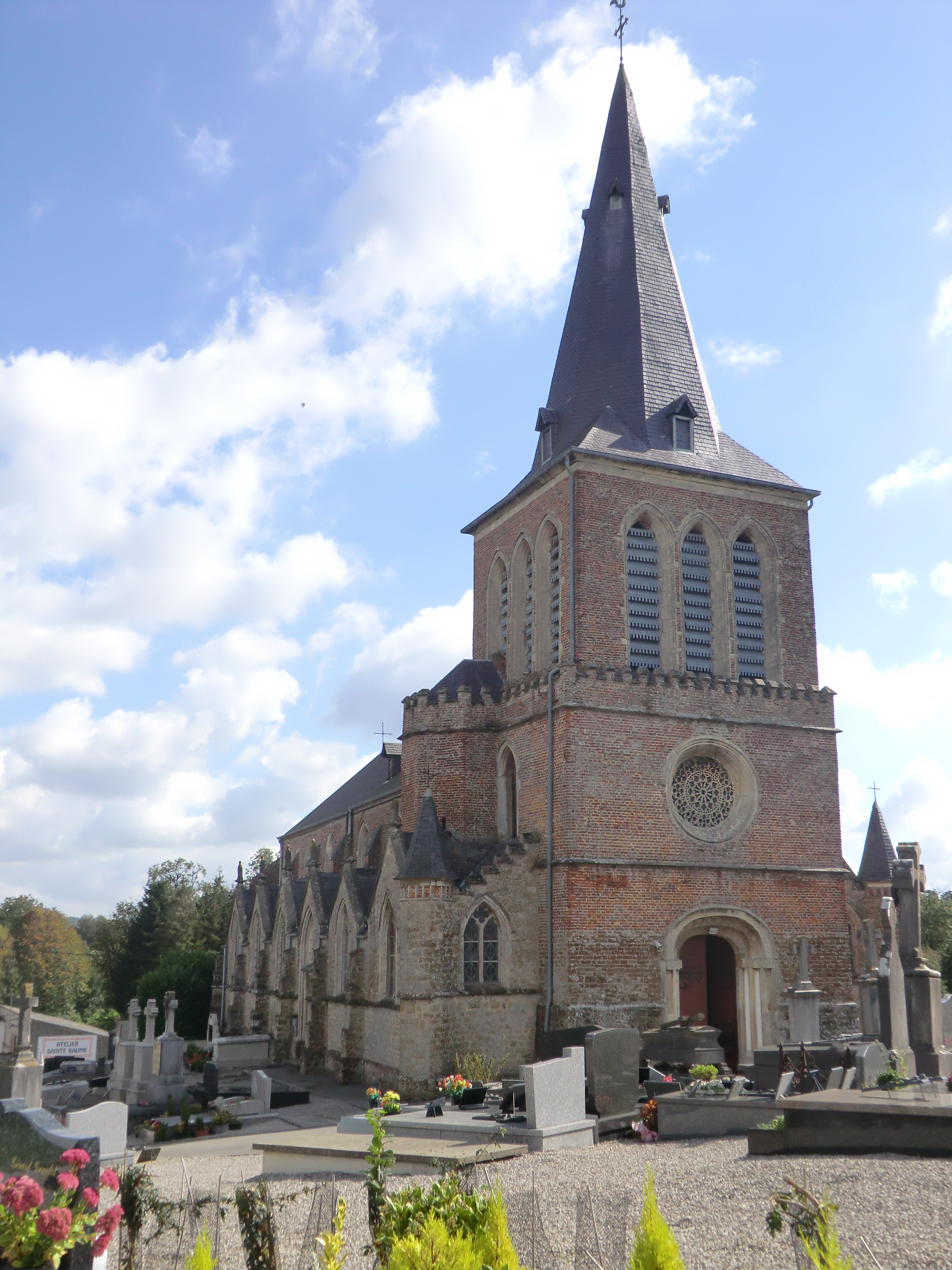
- The church of Wirwignes

- Coat of arms
- Location of Wirwignes
- Location within France Location within Hauts-de-France
- Coordinates: 50°41′09″N 1°45′43″E
- Country: France
- Region: Hauts-de-France
- Department: Pas-de-Calais
- Arrondissement: Boulogne-sur-Mer
- Canton: Desvres
- Intercommunality: Desvres-Samer

Government
  - Mayor (2020–2026): André Goudalle
- Area^{1}: 12.47 km^{2} (4.81 sq mi)
- Elevation: 28 m (92 ft)
- Highest elevation: 102 m (335 ft)
- Lowest elevation: 22 m (72 ft)
- Population (2023): 768
  - Density: 61.6/km^{2} (160/sq mi)
- Time zone: UTC+01:00 (CET)
  - Summer (DST): UTC+02:00 (CEST)
- INSEE/Postal code: 62896 /62240
- ^{1} French Land Register data, which excludes lakes, ponds, glaciers > 1 km^{2} (0.386 sq mi or 247 acres) and river estuaries.

Wirwignes (French pronunciation: [viʁviɲ]; West Flemish: Willewine) is a commune in the Pas-de-Calais department in the Hauts-de-France region of France.

== Geography ==
Wirwignes is situated some 8 miles (13 km) southeast of Boulogne, at the junction of the D238 and the D341 roads, on the banks of the river Liane.

== Population ==
Historical population
Year	Pop.	±% p.a.
1968	507	—
1975	492	−0.43%
1982	528	+1.01%
1990	638	+2.39%
1999	682	+0.74%
2007	704	+0.40%
2012	739	+0.98%
2017	746	+0.19%
2023	768	+0.49%
Source: INSEE

== Places of interest ==
- The church of St.Quentin, dating from the fifteenth century.
- The château de Quenneval, dating from the seventeenth century.
- A seventeenth century fortified manorhouse.

== See also ==
- Communes of the Pas-de-Calais department
