= Crémarest =

- Commune
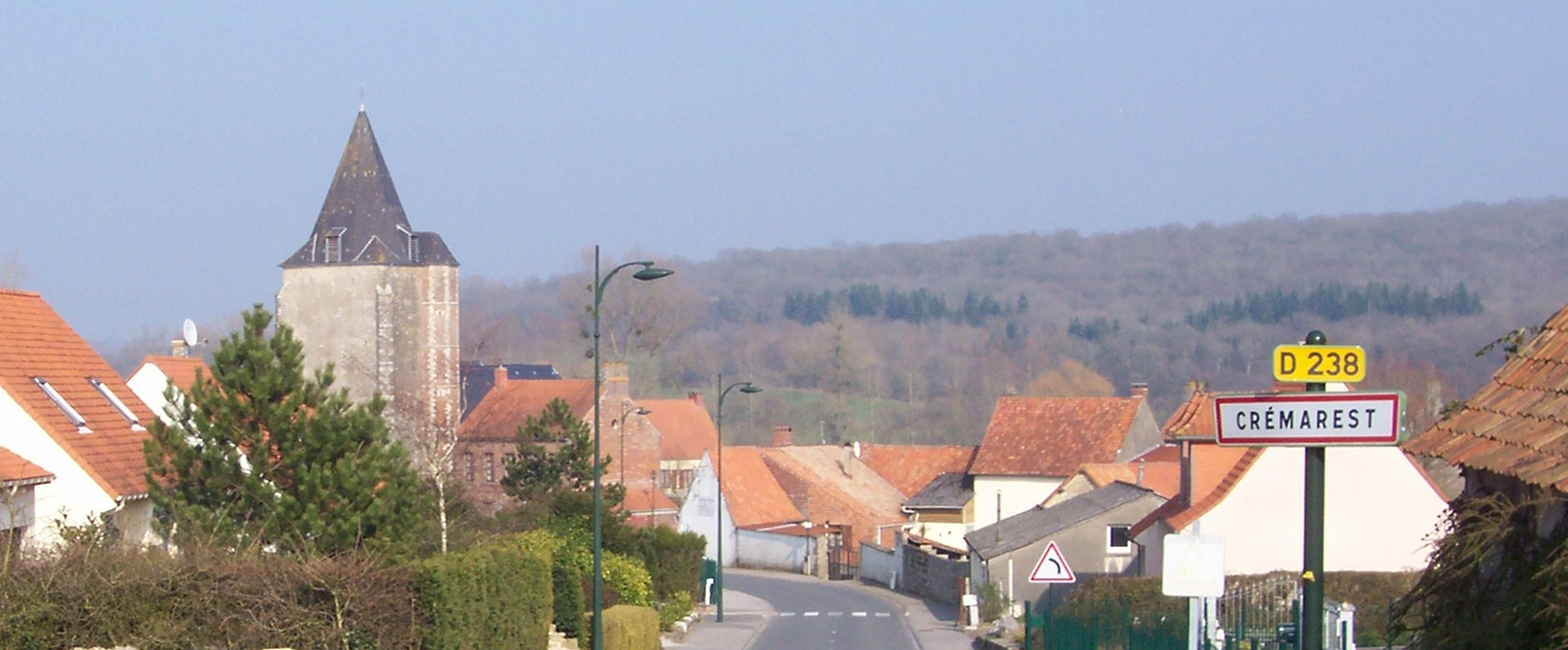
- A general view of Cremarest

- Coat of arms
- Location of Crémarest
- Location within France Location within Hauts-de-France
- Coordinates: 50°42′01″N 1°47′10″E
- Country: France
- Region: Hauts-de-France
- Department: Pas-de-Calais
- Arrondissement: Boulogne-sur-Mer
- Canton: Desvres
- Intercommunality: CC Desvres-Samer

Government
  - Mayor (2020–2026): Claude Prudhomme
- Area^{1}: 11.69 km^{2} (4.51 sq mi)
- Elevation: 35 m (115 ft)
- Highest elevation: 108 m (354 ft)
- Lowest elevation: 24 m (79 ft)
- Population (2023): 815
  - Density: 69.7/km^{2} (181/sq mi)
- Time zone: UTC+01:00 (CET)
  - Summer (DST): UTC+02:00 (CEST)
- INSEE/Postal code: 62255 /62240
- ^{1} French Land Register data, which excludes lakes, ponds, glaciers > 1 km^{2} (0.386 sq mi or 247 acres) and river estuaries.

Crémarest (French pronunciation: [kʁemaʁɛ]) is a commune in the Pas-de-Calais department in the Hauts-de-France region of France.

== Geography ==
A farming and forestry village, some 8 miles (13 km) east of Boulogne, at the junction of the D238 and the D254 roads, by the banks of the river Liane.

== Population ==
Historical population
Year	Pop.	±% p.a.
1968	495	—
1975	486	−0.26%
1982	462	−0.72%
1990	563	+2.50%
1999	658	+1.75%
2007	686	+0.52%
2012	815	+3.51%
2017	786	−0.72%
2023	815	+0.61%
Source: INSEE

== Places of interest ==
- The church of St. Espirit, dating from the sixteenth century.
- The seventeenth-century chateau of La Freynoye.
- Remains of an old castle.

== See also ==
- Communes of the Pas-de-Calais department
