= Carly, Pas-de-Calais =

Carly
- Commune
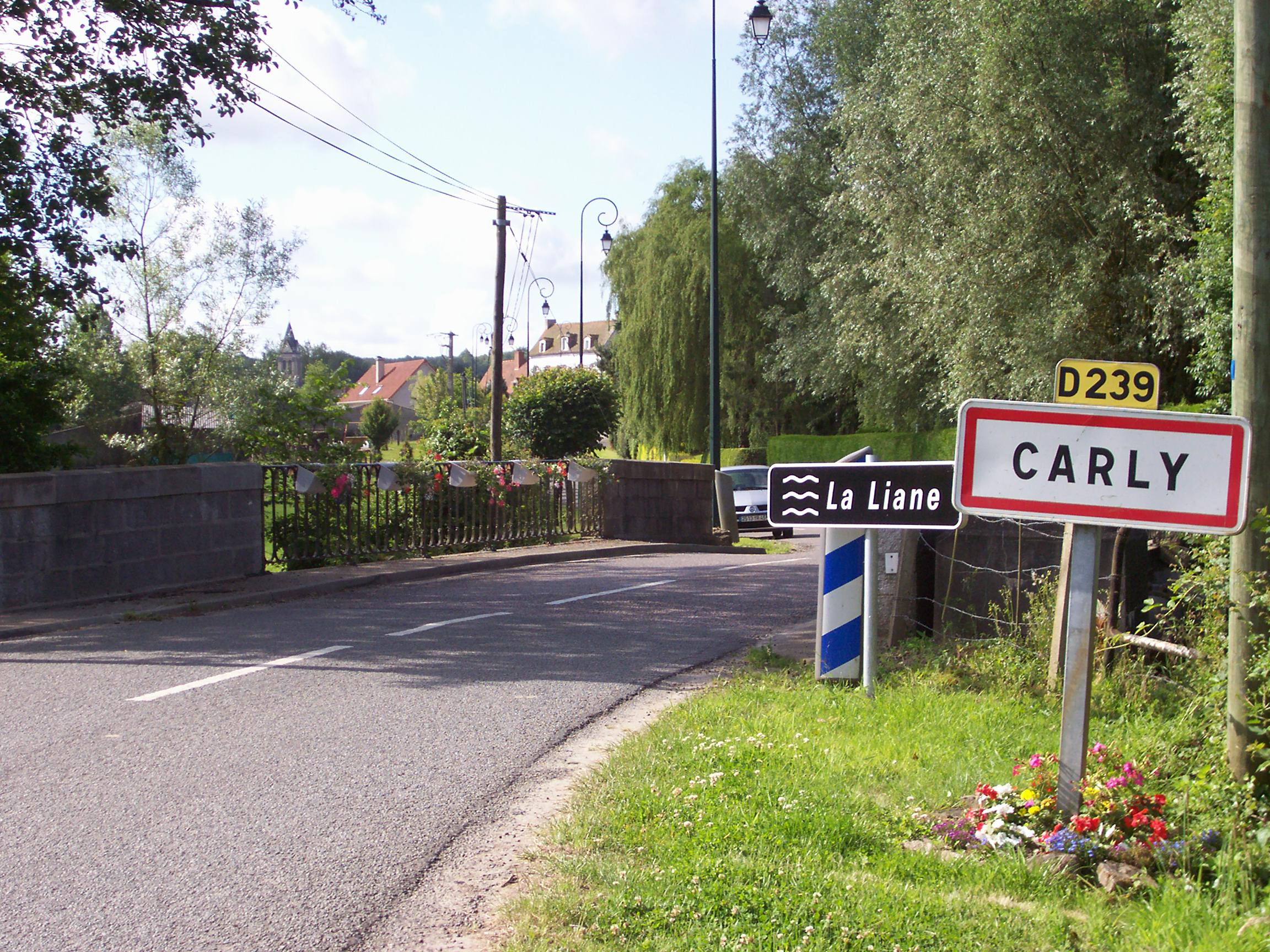
- The road into Carly

- Coat of arms
- Location of Carly
- Location within France Location within Hauts-de-France
- Coordinates: 50°39′09″N 1°42′10″E
- Country: France
- Region: Hauts-de-France
- Department: Pas-de-Calais
- Arrondissement: Boulogne-sur-Mer
- Canton: Desvres
- Intercommunality: CC Desvres-Samer

Government
  - Mayor (2020–2026): Aimé Herduin
- Area^{1}: 6.31 km^{2} (2.44 sq mi)
- Elevation: 27 m (89 ft)
- Highest elevation: 110 m (360 ft)
- Lowest elevation: 11 m (36 ft)
- Population (2023): 638
  - Density: 101/km^{2} (262/sq mi)
- Time zone: UTC+01:00 (CET)
  - Summer (DST): UTC+02:00 (CEST)
- INSEE/Postal code: 62214 /62830
- ^{1} French Land Register data, which excludes lakes, ponds, glaciers > 1 km^{2} (0.386 sq mi or 247 acres) and river estuaries.

Carly (French pronunciation: [kaʁli]) is a commune in the Pas-de-Calais department in the Hauts-de-France region of France about 7 miles (11 km) southeast of Boulogne by the banks of the river Liane.

== Population ==
Historical population
Year	Pop.	±% p.a.
1968	285	—
1975	279	−0.30%
1982	307	+1.38%
1990	463	+5.27%
1999	525	+1.41%
2007	540	+0.35%
2012	580	+1.44%
2017	551	−1.02%
2023	638	+2.47%
Source: INSEE

== See also ==
- Communes of the Pas-de-Calais department
