= Alincthun =

- Commune
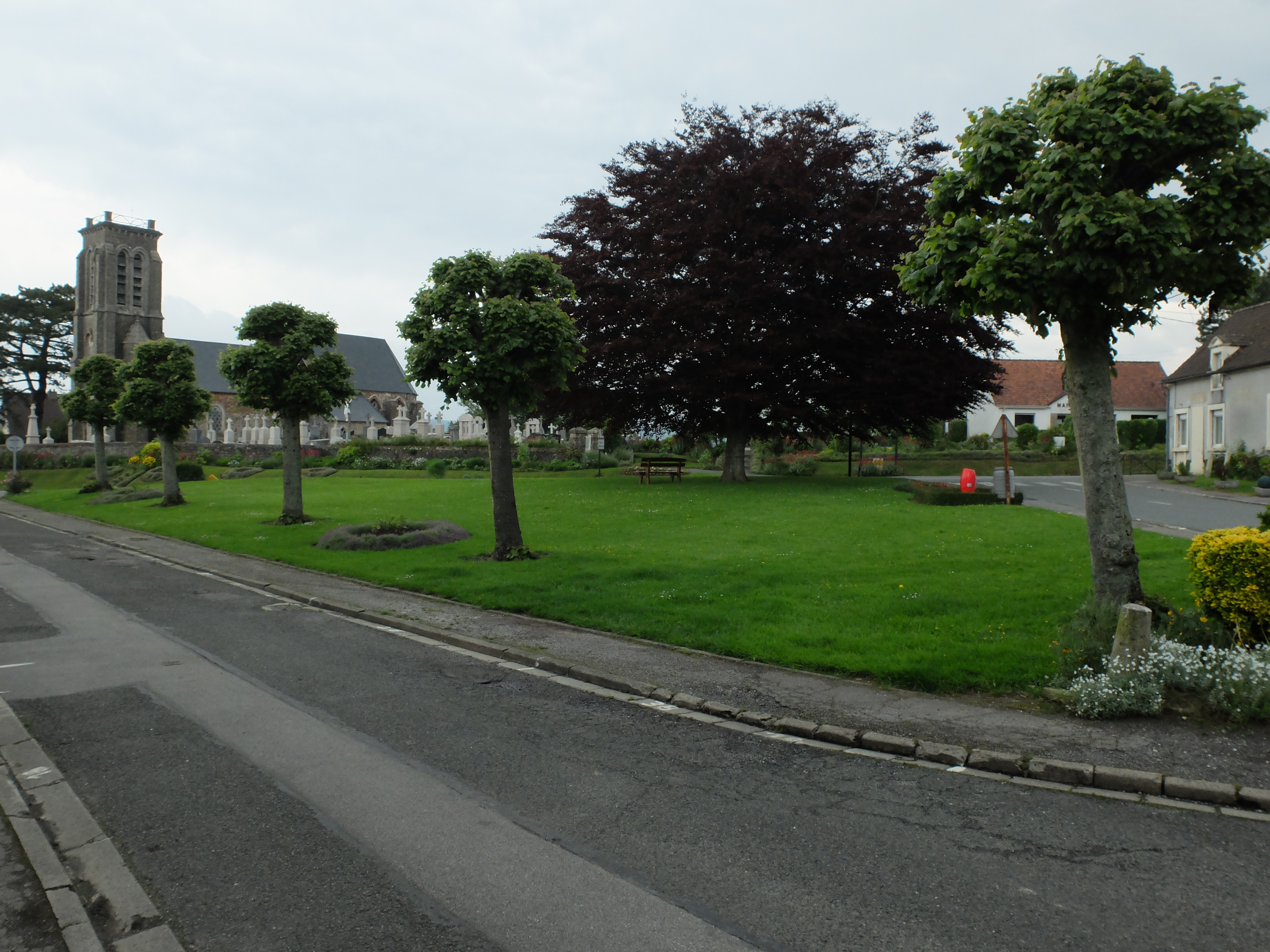
- The green in front of the church

- Coat of arms
- Location of Alincthun
- Location within France Location within Hauts-de-France
- Coordinates: 50°43′55″N 1°48′07″E
- Country: France
- Region: Hauts-de-France
- Department: Pas-de-Calais
- Arrondissement: Boulogne-sur-Mer
- Canton: Desvres
- Intercommunality: Desvres-Samer

Government
  - Mayor (2020–2026): Jean Picque
- Area^{1}: 9.88 km^{2} (3.81 sq mi)
- Elevation: 98 m (322 ft)
- Highest elevation: 120 m (390 ft)
- Lowest elevation: 33 m (108 ft)
- Population (2023): 291
  - Density: 29.5/km^{2} (76.3/sq mi)
- Time zone: UTC+01:00 (CET)
  - Summer (DST): UTC+02:00 (CEST)
- INSEE/Postal code: 62022 /62142
- ^{1} French Land Register data, which excludes lakes, ponds, glaciers > 1 km^{2} (0.386 sq mi or 247 acres) and river estuaries.

Alincthun (French pronunciation: [alɛ̃ktœ̃]) is a commune in the Pas-de-Calais department in the Hauts-de-France region of France.

== Geography ==
A small farming commune comprising 12 hamlets, some 10 miles (16 km) east of Boulogne, at the junction of the D238e2 and the D137 roads. The river Liane flows through the village.

== Population ==
Historical population
Year	Pop.	±% p.a.
1968	314	—
1975	309	−0.23%
1982	322	+0.59%
1990	364	+1.54%
1999	343	−0.66%
2007	355	+0.43%
2012	334	−1.21%
2017	330	−0.24%
2023	291	−2.07%
Source: INSEE

== Transport ==
The Chemin de fer de Boulogne à Bonningues (CF de BB) opened a station serving Le Wast and Alincthun on 22 April 1900. Passenger services were withdrawn on 31 December 1935. They were reinstated in November 1942. The CF de BB closed in 1948.

== Sights ==
- The church of St. Denis, dating from the seventeenth century.
- The seventeenth-century Château du Fresnoy.
- Three 17th-century manor houses at La Guilbauderie, Le Fay and Bois-du-Coq.
- A water mill.

== See also ==
- Communes of the Pas-de-Calais department
