= Hesdigneul-lès-Boulogne =

- Commune
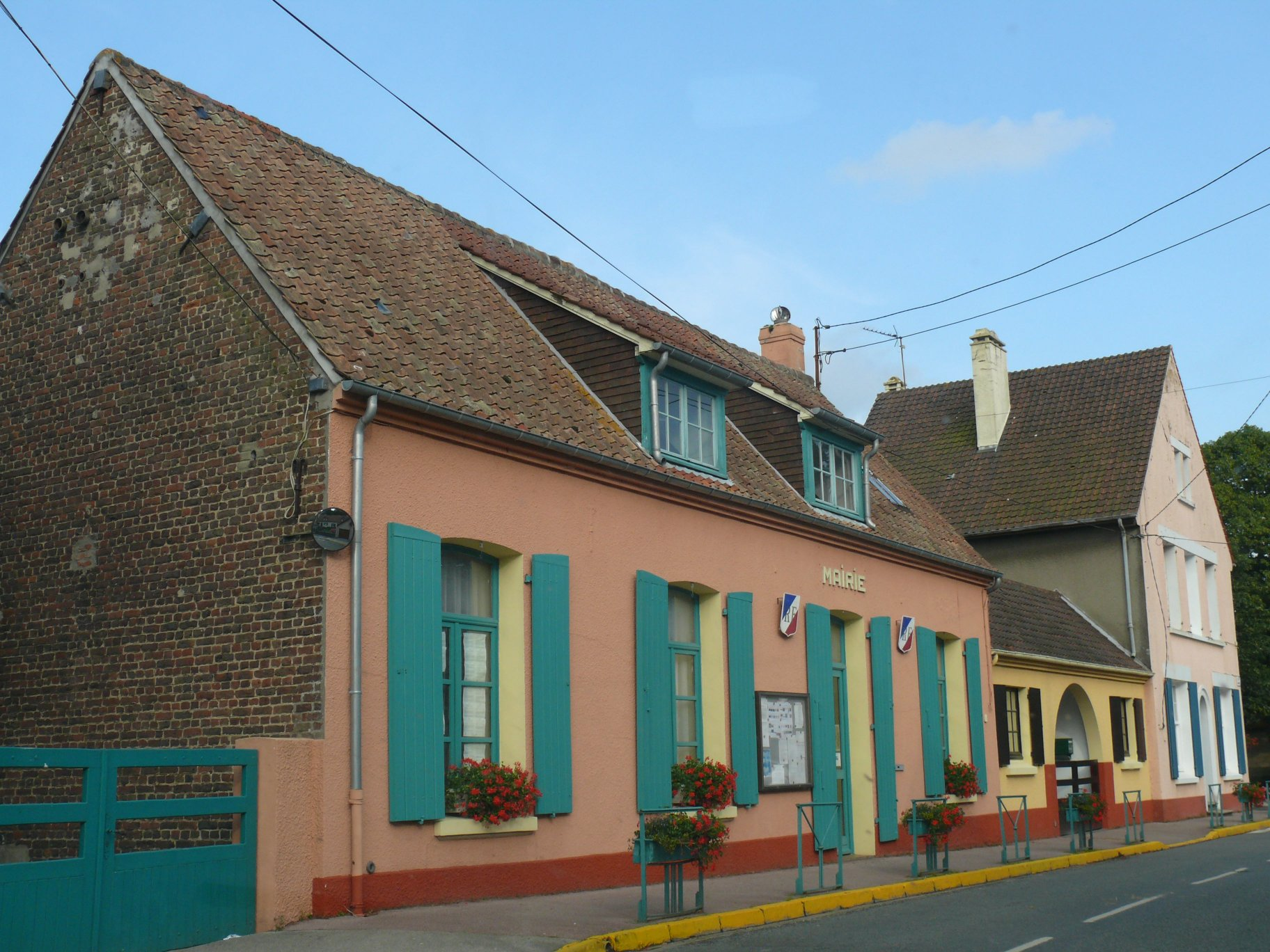
- The town hall of Hesdigneul-lès-Boulogne

- Coat of arms
- Location of Hesdigneul-lès-Boulogne
- Location within France Location within Hauts-de-France
- Coordinates: 50°39′36″N 1°40′13″E
- Country: France
- Region: Hauts-de-France
- Department: Pas-de-Calais
- Arrondissement: Boulogne-sur-Mer
- Canton: Outreau
- Intercommunality: CA du Boulonnais

Government
  - Mayor (2020–2026): Yves Hennequin
- Area^{1}: 3.32 km^{2} (1.28 sq mi)
- Elevation: 14 m (46 ft)
- Highest elevation: 67 m (220 ft)
- Lowest elevation: 8 m (26 ft)
- Population (2023): 853
  - Density: 257/km^{2} (665/sq mi)
- Time zone: UTC+01:00 (CET)
  - Summer (DST): UTC+02:00 (CEST)
- INSEE/Postal code: 62446 /62360
- ^{1} French Land Register data, which excludes lakes, ponds, glaciers > 1 km^{2} (0.386 sq mi or 247 acres) and river estuaries.

Hesdigneul-lès-Boulogne (French pronunciation: [ediɲœl lɛ bulɔɲ], literally Hesdigneul near Boulogne; Picard: Hédignu-lès-Boulonne) is a commune in the Pas-de-Calais department in the Hauts-de-France region of France.

== Geography ==
A forestry and farming village situated some 5 miles (8.0 km) south of Boulogne, at the junction of the D52 and D240 roads. The A16 autoroute forms the western border of the commune and the river Liane the north and eastern.

== Population ==
Historical population
Year	Pop.	±% p.a.
1968	620	—
1975	621	+0.02%
1982	621	+0.00%
1990	618	−0.06%
1999	579	−0.72%
2007	681	+2.05%
2012	669	−0.35%
2017	677	+0.24%
2023	853	+3.93%
Source: INSEE

== Places of interest ==
- The church of St. Eloi, dating from the nineteenth century.

== See also ==
- Communes of the Pas-de-Calais department
