= Selles, Pas-de-Calais =

Selles Zele
- Commune
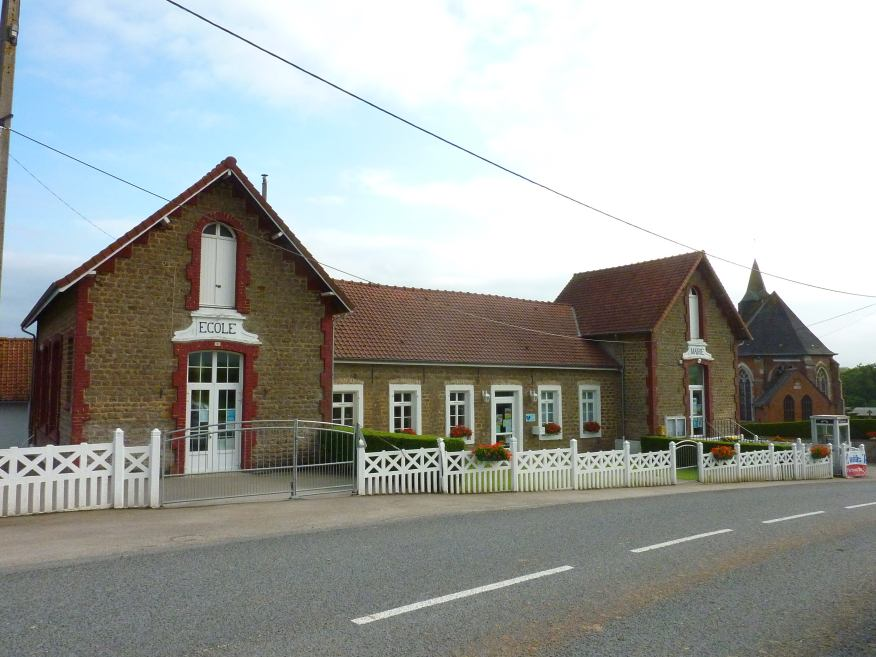
- The town hall and school of Selles

- Coat of arms
- Location of Selles
- Location within France Location within Hauts-de-France
- Coordinates: 50°42′01″N 1°53′47″E
- Country: France
- Region: Hauts-de-France
- Department: Pas-de-Calais
- Arrondissement: Boulogne-sur-Mer
- Canton: Desvres
- Intercommunality: CC Desvres-Samer

Government
  - Mayor (2020–2026): Fabienne Fourrier
- Area^{1}: 6.35 km^{2} (2.45 sq mi)
- Elevation: 74 m (243 ft)
- Highest elevation: 96 m (315 ft)
- Lowest elevation: 47 m (154 ft)
- Population (2023): 299
  - Density: 47.1/km^{2} (122/sq mi)
- Time zone: UTC+01:00 (CET)
  - Summer (DST): UTC+02:00 (CEST)
- INSEE/Postal code: 62786 /62240
- ^{1} French Land Register data, which excludes lakes, ponds, glaciers > 1 km^{2} (0.386 sq mi or 247 acres) and river estuaries.

Selles (French pronunciation: [sɛl]; West Flemish: Zele) is a commune in the Pas-de-Calais department in the Hauts-de-France region of France about 14 miles (23 km) east of Boulogne by the banks of the river Liane.

== Population ==
Historical population
Year	Pop.	±% p.a.
1968	314	—
1975	304	−0.46%
1982	296	−0.38%
1990	277	−0.83%
1999	286	+0.36%
2007	320	+1.41%
2012	323	+0.19%
2017	333	+0.61%
2023	299	−1.78%
Source: INSEE

== See also ==
- Communes of the Pas-de-Calais department
