= Liane (river) =

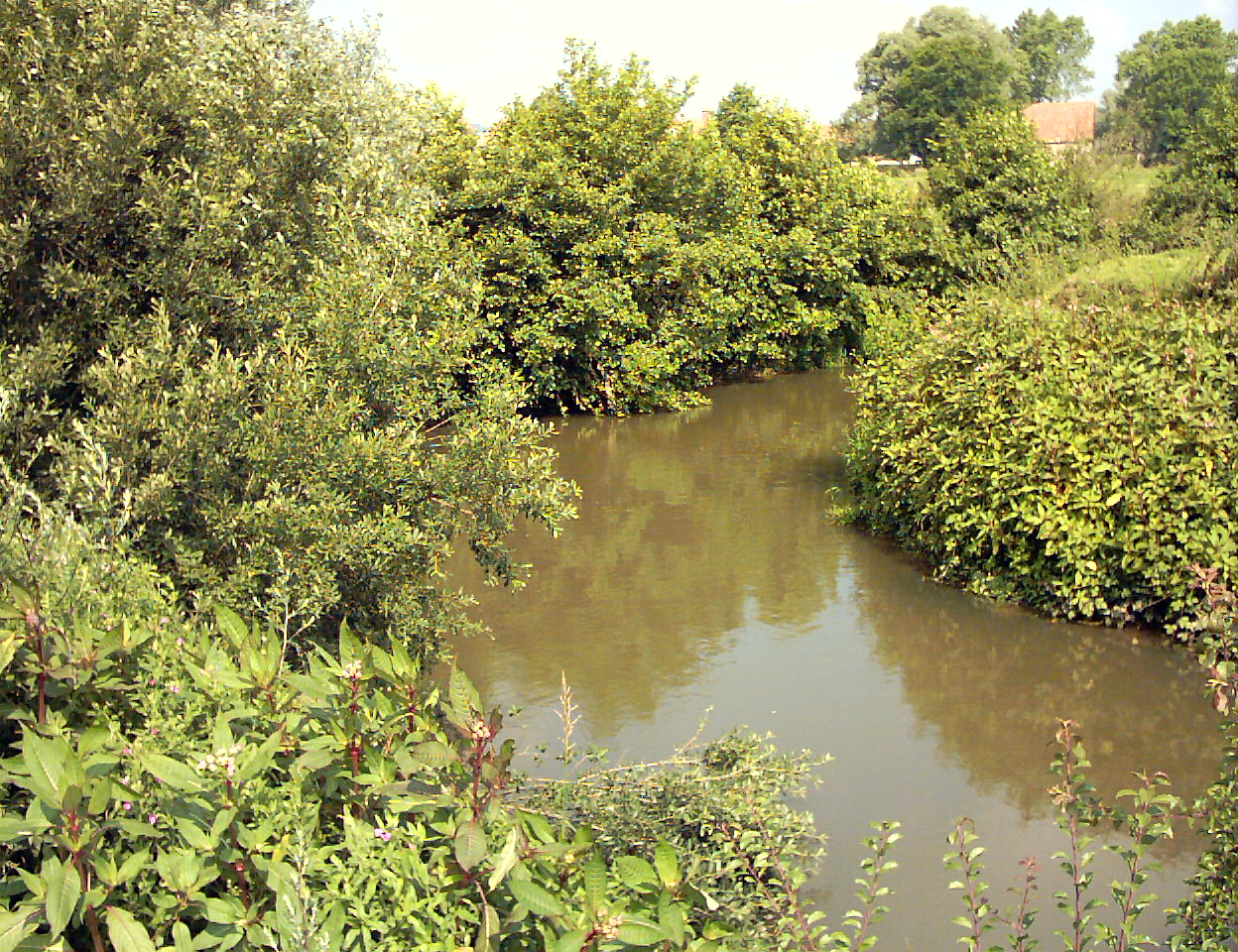
- The Liane at Hesdigneul-lès-Boulogne

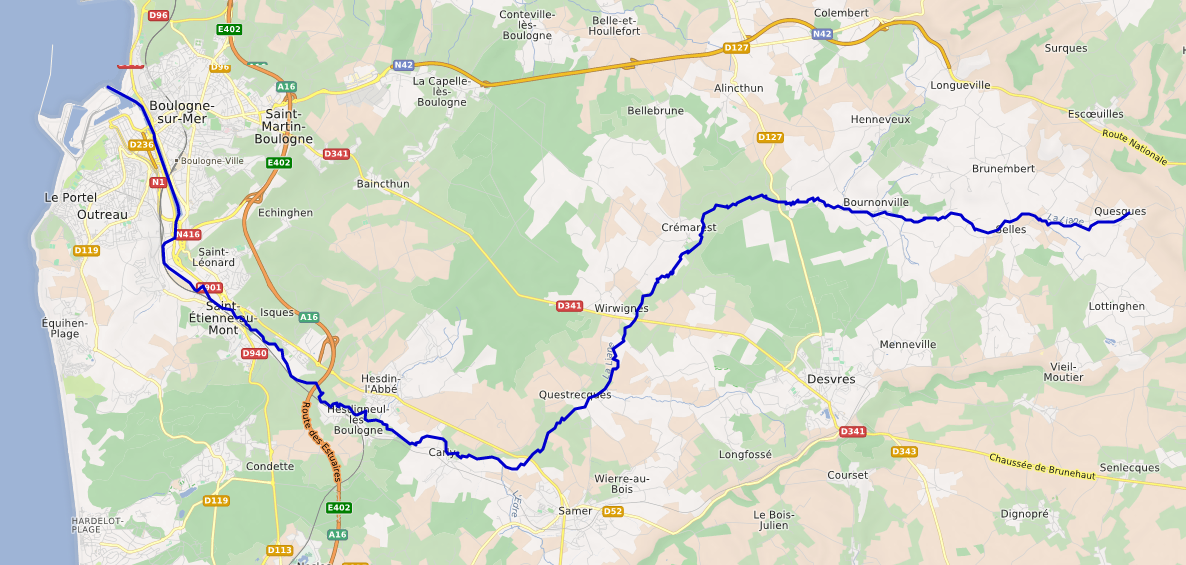
- Native name: La Liane (French)

Location
- Country: France

Physical characteristics
- Source
  - location: Quesques, Pas-de-Calais
- Mouth: The English Channel
  - coordinates: 50.7317°N 1.5865°E
- Length: 38 km (24 mi)
- Basin size: 244 km^{2} (94 sq mi)
- Discharge
  - average: 2.99 m^{3}/s (106 cu ft/s)

The Liane is a 38 km long river in the Pas-de-Calais department in northern France. It rises in Quesques and flows into the English Channel at Boulogne-sur-Mer. Other communes along its length include: Selles, Brunembert, Bournonville, Alincthun, Crémarest, Wirwignes, Questrecques, Samer, Carly, Hesdigneul-lès-Boulogne, Isques, Saint-Léonard, Hesdin-l'Abbé, Condette, Saint-Étienne-au-Mont, and Outreau.

== Geography ==
The Liane flows for a length of 38.2 km. It rises at Quesques, then flows through the communes of Bournonville, Wirwignes, Questrecques, Carly, Hesdigneul, Isques and Saint-Léonard. It finally flows into the English channel at Boulogne-sur-Mer. Before being fitted with canals and locks, the Liane estuary contributed directly to the fleuve marin côtier which abuts the Picardy estuaries up to the location of the two capes. It has been proposed in one variation of the project that its estuary, although significantly transformed by technology, should be part of a putative natural park, the Parc naturel marin à l'ouvert des estuaires picards et en mer d'Opale, a proposal in preparation since 2008 and submitted to public enquiry in 2011.

=== Morphology and tributaries ===
The average gradient of the Liane is 2.8 ‰. Its tributaries include the following:

Right tributaries:

- Lamy
- Corette
- Echinghem

Left tributaries:

- Lottinghem
- Vieil Moutier
- Menneville
- l'Edre
- Desvres

== Hydrology ==
The Liane is a very fast flowing river, but quite irregular. Its flow rate has been measured over a 27-year period (1965–1991), at Hesdigneul-lès-Boulogne near Boulogne-sur-Mer, a short way from its mouth. The watershed of the river at that point is 196 km², or approximately 80% of its maximum value of 244 km²). (Note: The Liane hosts two hydrometric stations, at Wirwignes (watershed 100 km²) and Hesdigneul-lès-Boulogne (watershed 196 km²).)

The mean interannual flow rate or discharge of the Liane at Hesdigneul-lès-Boulogne is 2.99 m³/s.

Just like its neighbour, the Wimereux, but unlike most Pas-de-Calais waterways, the Liane exhibits highly marked seasonal fluctuations. High waters occur at the end of autumn and in winter, characterised by monthly mean flow rates between 3.06 and 5.33 m³/s, from November to March inclusive with a maximum in January. Low waters occur in summer, from June to September, with a decrease in monthly mean flow rate descending to 0.76 m³/s in August. However variations in flow rate are much more pronounced over short periods or from year to year.

Mean monthly flow rate of the Liane (in m³/s) measured at the Hesdigneul-lès-Boulogne hydrological station
over a period of 27 years

At low water, the 3-year low instantaneous flow rate can drop to 0.066 m³/s in the case of a dry five-year period or 66 litres per second, which can be described as severe.

Floods can be very significant considering the modest size of this small river and its watershed. The instantaneous maximal flowrate 2 (IMFR2) and IMFR5 metrics are 37 and 52 m³ respectively. The IMFR10, or flow rate calculated from the ten-year flood, is 61 m³/s, the IMFR20 is 70 m³/s and the IMFR50 was 82 m³/s.

The maximum instantaneous flow rate recorded at Hesdigneul-lès-Boulogne during the 2-year measurement period was 47.3 m³/s on 1 December 1979, while the maximum daily average flow rate was 41.6 m³/s on 6 February 1988. Comparing the first of these values to the scale of the IMFR numbers, it becomes clear that the 1979 flood was hardly a 5-year event, and thus floods of this size are to be expected very frequently.

The Liane is a very fast-flowing small river, fed heavily by the high rainfall in its watershed. The watershed runoff curve number is 483 mm annually, which is substantially larger than the average of France based on all its watersheds, as well as, for example, the average for the watershed of the neighbouring Lys which measures 249 mm at Wervicq-Sud. The specific flow rate reaches 15.3 litres per second per square kilometre of watershed.

== Ecological status ==
Other than near its source, the Liane's water quality was mediocre to highly polluted during the years 1980–1990, mainly as a result of industrial and urban waste. Towns and industries are now polluting less, but ploughing has conquered land from farming and pasture which have been pushed back in this region, and farmland erosion and fields which are kept barren in winter and autumn are a cause of the Liane's almost constant turbidity. In 2005, the Liane remained turbid and its French water quality grade insatisfaisante (unsatisfactory), with too much nitrates and organic substances from Carly onwards, according to the water agency. At the mouth at Boulogne, the Liane's waters are graded as mauvaise (bad), with all the indicators being bad: macro-pollutants, organic and oxidizable substances, azot substances (nitrates) and phosphoric substances.
The situation may be improved by the Water Framework Directive, and by the local Schéma d'Aménagement et de Gestion des Eaux water management scheme.

For some years a fishermen's association has, through various activities, attempted to make the Liane known other than for its reputation as being highly polluted; while this is true around Boulogne-sur-Mer, there are some places where the Liane is a picturesque river with swarms of fish. The Association des Pêcheurs de la Vallée de la Liane fishermen's association even regularly deposits wild trout (known as "farios") to repopulate the river and replace the fish which they have caught.

== See also ==
- List of rivers of France
