= Communauté de communes du Pays de la Faïence de Desvres =

Coordinates: 50.6687°N 1.835°E

Pays de la Faïence de Desvres
- Former communauté de communes
- Interactive map of Pays de la Faïence de Desvres
- Country: France
- Region: Hauts-de-France
- Department: Pas-de-Calais
- No. of communes: {{{nbcomm}}}
- Established: 1996
- Disbanded: 2009
- Area: 183 km^{2} (71 sq mi)
- Population (2005): 15,195
  - Density: 83.0/km^{2} (215/sq mi)

The communauté de communes du Pays de la Faïence de Desvres is a former communauté de communes in the Pas-de-Calais département and in the Nord-Pas-de-Calais region of France. It was created in January 1996. It was merged into the new Communauté de communes de Desvres-Samer in January 2009.

== Composition ==
This Communauté de communes comprised 23 communes:

1. Alincthun
2. Bellebrune
3. Belle-et-Houllefort
4. Bournonville
5. Brunembert
6. Colembert
7. Courset
8. Crémarest
9. Desvres
10. Doudeauville
11. Henneveux
12. Le Wast
13. Longfossé
14. Longueville
15. Lottinghen
16. Menneville
17. Nabringhen
18. Quesques
19. Saint-Martin-Choquel
20. Selles
21. Senlecques
22. Vieil-Moutier
23. Wirwignes

== See also ==
- Communes of the Pas-de-Calais department
