= Canton of Samer =

Coordinates: 50°38′22″N 1°41′28″E

Samer
- Former canton
- Interactive map of Samer
- Country: France
- Region: Hauts-de-France
- Department: Pas-de-Calais
- No. of communes: {{{nbcomm}}}
- Disbanded: 2015
- Area: 166.16 km^{2} (64.15 sq mi)
- Population (2012): 27,775
  - Density: 167.16/km^{2} (432.94/sq mi)

The canton of Samer is a former canton situated in the department of the Pas-de-Calais and in the Nord-Pas-de-Calais region of northern France. It was disbanded following the French canton reorganisation which came into effect in March 2015. It had a total of 27,775 inhabitants (2012).

== Geography ==
The canton is organised around Samer in the arrondissement of Boulogne-sur-Mer. The altitude varies from 2m (Saint-Léonard) to 199m (Samer) for an average altitude of 53m.

The canton comprised 18 communes:

- Carly
- Condette
- Dannes
- Doudeauville
- Halinghen
- Hesdigneul-lès-Boulogne
- Hesdin-l'Abbé
- Isques
- Lacres
- Nesles
- Neufchâtel-Hardelot
- Questrecques
- Saint-Étienne-au-Mont
- Saint-Léonard
- Samer
- Tingry
- Verlincthun
- Wierre-au-Bois

== Population ==
Population Evolution
1962	1968	1975	1982	1990	1999
16792	18948	21990	23822	26073	26890
Census count starting from 1962 : Population without double counting

== See also ==
- Cantons of Pas-de-Calais
- Communes of Pas-de-Calais
- Arrondissements of the Pas-de-Calais department
