= Communauté de communes de Samer et environs =

Coordinates: 50.6384°N 1.7472°E

Samer et environs
- Former communauté de communes
- Interactive map of Samer et environs
- Country: France
- Region: Hauts-de-France
- Department: Pas-de-Calais
- No. of communes: {{{nbcomm}}}
- Established: 2002
- Disbanded: 2009
- Population (1999): 5,278

The communauté de communes de Samer et environs was located in the Pas-de-Calais département in northern France. It was created in January 2002. It was merged into the new Communauté de communes de Desvres-Samer in January 2009.

The Communauté de communes comprised the following communes:

- Carly
- Halinghen
- Lacres
- Questrecques
- Samer
- Tingry
- Verlincthun
- Wierre-au-Bois
