= Gabriel Fourmaintraux =

French ceramic artist

- Born: 1886; Desvres
- Died: 1984 (aged 98)
- Known for: Ceramics
- Spouse: Marguerite (Margo)
- Children: Gabriel Fourmaintraux, Claude Fourmaintraux, Françoise Fourmaintraux

Gabriel Fourmaintraux (1886–1984) in Desvres, France was a French ceramic artist.

== Personal life ==
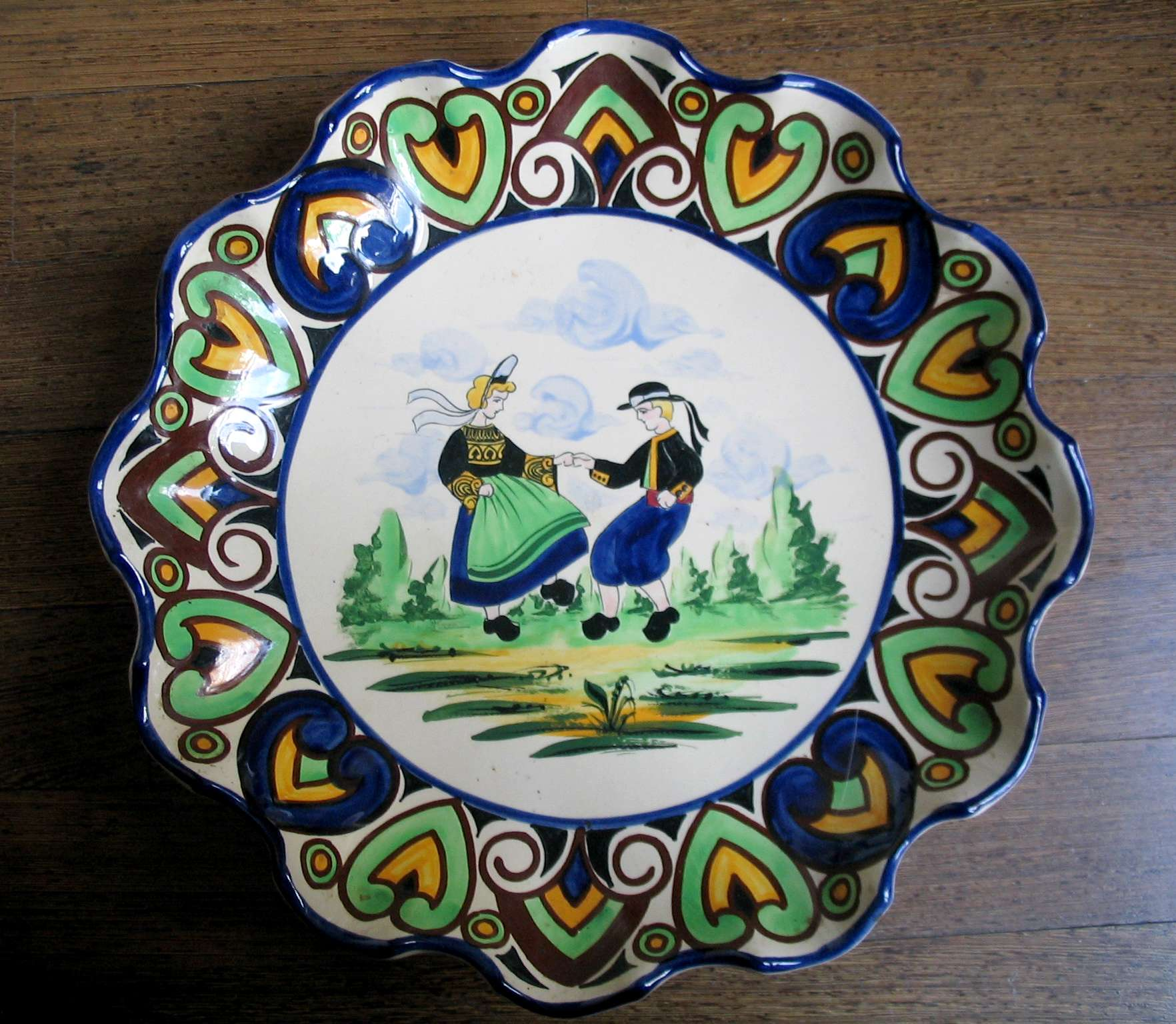
Plate by Fourmaintraux in the Breton style

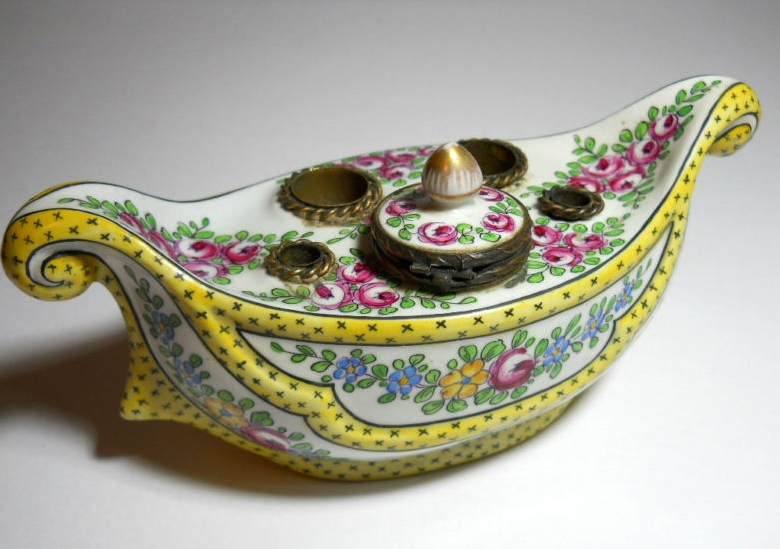
Inkwell by Fourmaintraux

Gabriel Emile Georges Alexandre Fourmaintraux, born 27 May 1886 in Desvres, was a member of a noted family of French ceramicists. His father was Emile Fourmaintraux (1857–1929) and his mother was Elisa Moison (1863–1930). He married Marguerite (known as Margo) and was the father of Gabriel Fourmaintraux (known as Gaby,1921-1941), ceramicist Claude Fourmaintraux and Françoise Fourmaintraux (1926–2021). He studied ceramics at the Graduate School of Ceramics in Sèvres and graduated "Major" in his class. He was active from 1905 until he retired in 1982.

The Fourmaintraux family's ceramics business can trace its origins to when in 1804, François-Joseph Fourmaintraux, a former worker at Sta, founded his own factory. The ceramicist Camille Fourmaintraux, is the 10th generation of his family working in ceramics. Historically, the family's name can sometimes be found spelt "Fourmentraux".

== Career ==
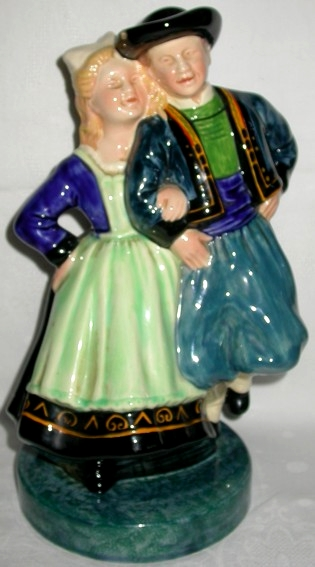
Faïence de Desvres by Gabriel Fourmaintraux

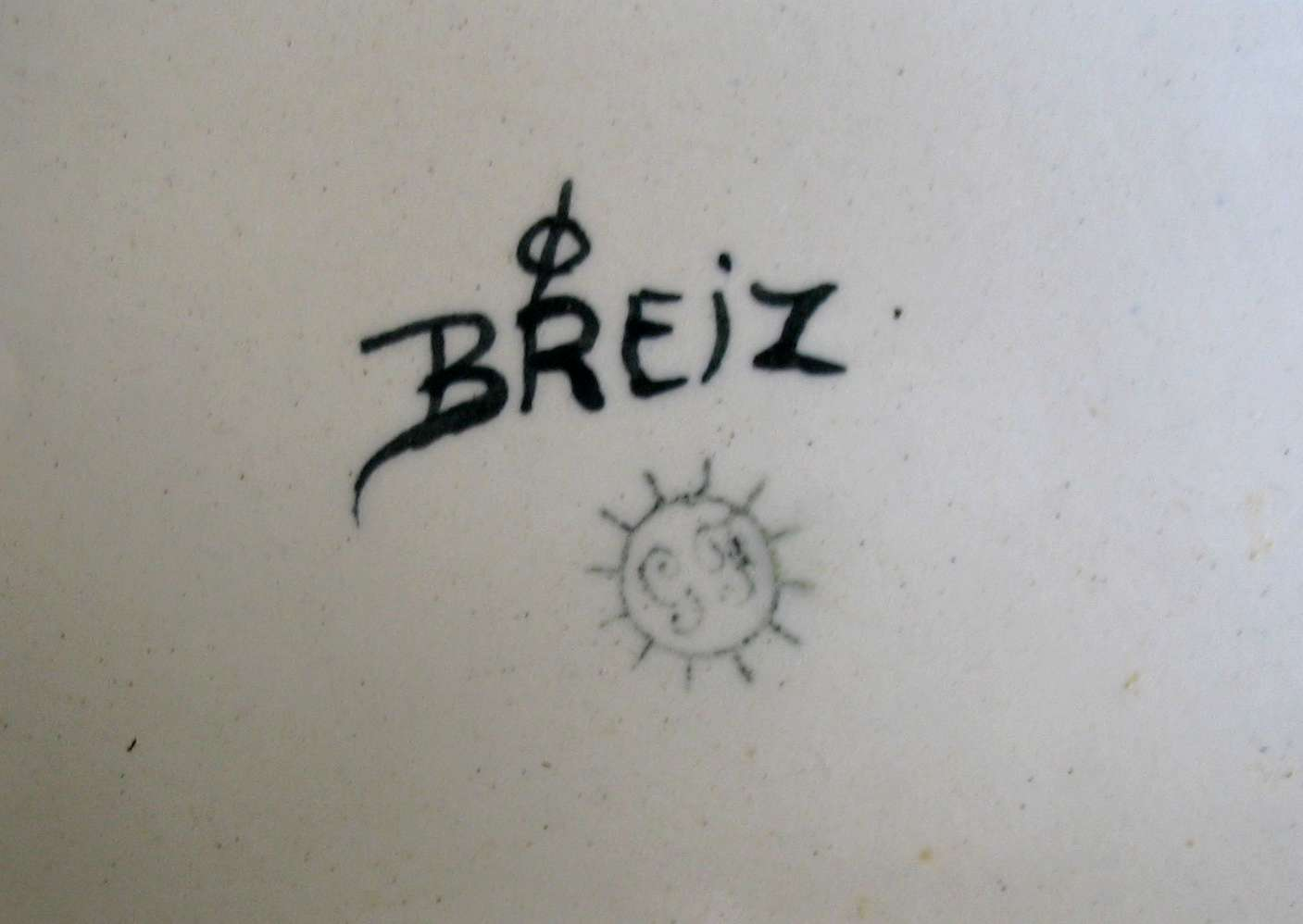
Maker's mark of Gabriel Fourmaintraux

He began working in his family factory in 1905 after graduating, initially working with his father Emile and taking over running it in 1930. Gabriel's son, Claude, began working with his father in 1941 and later took over running the factory from his father along with his brother-in-law Daniel Dutertre. Their sons, Olivier Fourmaintraux and Thierry Dutertre, took over managing the company in 1987. The factory closed in 1997.

The Fourmaintraux factory made a wide range of ceramics including lamps, advertising items, trophies, vases, ashtrays and tiles. Fourmaintraux collaborated with Fernand Léger, painter and potter who worked in Biot in the South of France. The association encouraged Fourmaintraux to work in primary colours - reds, white, yellows on a black or white ground. It also encouraged him to produce items in various original shapes. Most of Fourmaintraux's work was made using moulds, his potted items being rare.

Between 1909 and 1929, Gabriel had some success making and exporting a wide variety of items in porcelain. However production was expensive and adversely affected by the revaluation of the franc and the start of Art Deco in 1925. It was halted by the economic crisis of the 1930s. Fourmaintraux then switched production to pieces in French regional styles that were sold throughout France and Belgium. He became well known as a producer of Faïence de Desvres known in English as Faience. The Museum of la Belle Epoque de la Faïence de Desvres (which is housed in the former Fourmaintraux factory) contains a collection of more than 10,000 moulds by Gabriel Fourmaintraux.Pieces by Fourmaintraux – particularly his earlier work in porcelain – are now collector's items and can sell for many thousands of euros.
