= Tingri =

Tingri may refer to:

- Tingri County, county in Tibet
- Tingri (town), main town in Tingri County

== See also ==
- Tingry, France
