= Maninghen-Henne =

- Commune
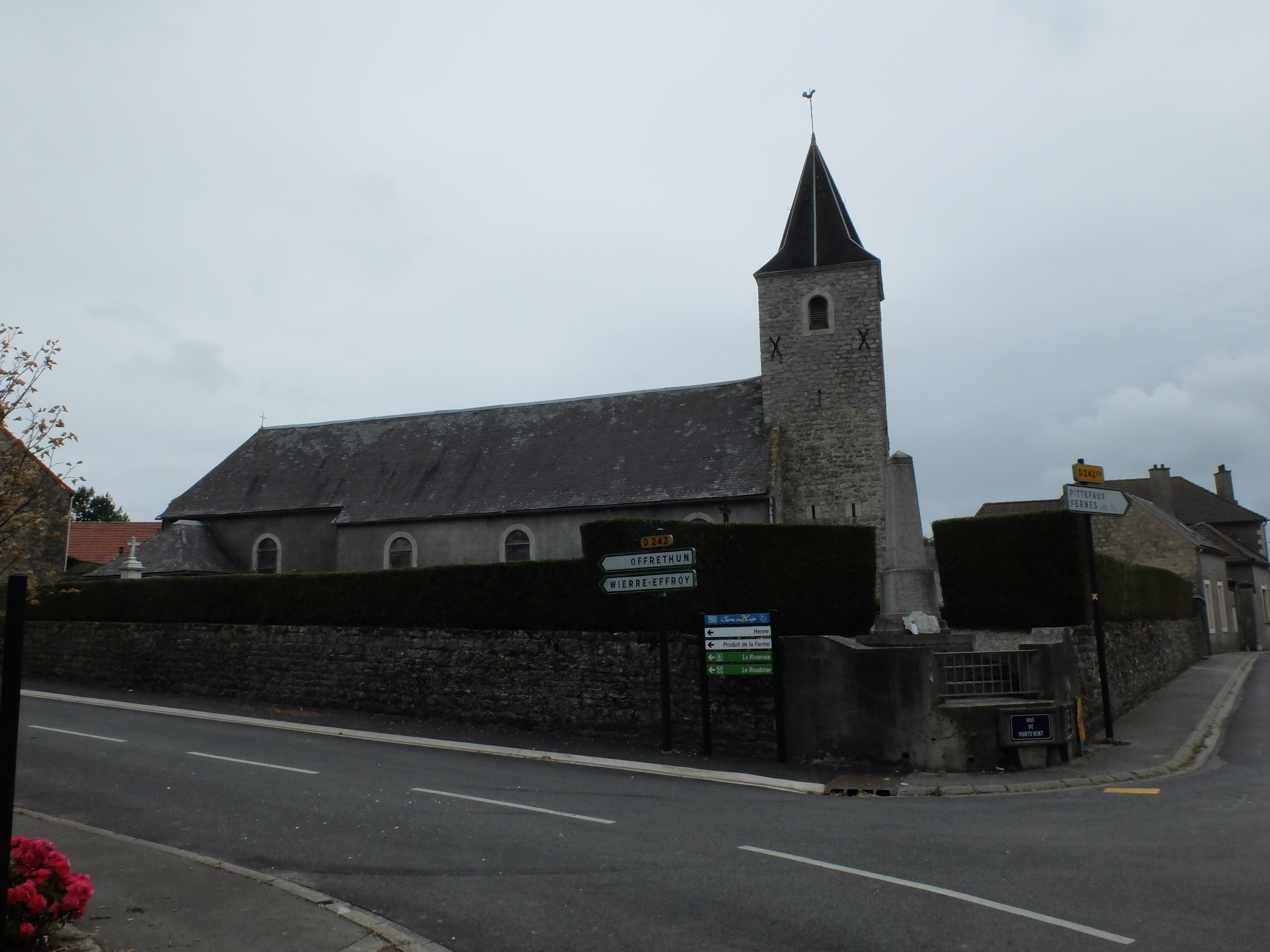
- The church of Maninghen-Henne

- Coat of arms
- Location of Maninghen-Henne
- Location within France Location within Hauts-de-France
- Coordinates: 50°46′08″N 1°40′10″E
- Country: France
- Region: Hauts-de-France
- Department: Pas-de-Calais
- Arrondissement: Boulogne-sur-Mer
- Canton: Desvres
- Intercommunality: CC Terre des Deux Caps

Government
  - Mayor (2020–2026): Didier Beal
- Area^{1}: 3.99 km^{2} (1.54 sq mi)
- Elevation: 89 m (292 ft)
- Highest elevation: 115 m (377 ft)
- Lowest elevation: 9 m (30 ft)
- Population (2023): 336
  - Density: 84.2/km^{2} (218/sq mi)
- Time zone: UTC+01:00 (CET)
  - Summer (DST): UTC+02:00 (CEST)
- INSEE/Postal code: 62546 /62250
- ^{1} French Land Register data, which excludes lakes, ponds, glaciers > 1 km^{2} (0.386 sq mi or 247 acres) and river estuaries.

Maninghen-Henne (French pronunciation: [manɛ̃ɡɑ̃ ɛn]) is a commune in the Pas-de-Calais department in the Hauts-de-France region of France.

== Geography ==
Maninghen-Henne is situated some 5 miles (8 km) northeast of Boulogne, at the junction of the D242 and D233 roads.

== Population ==
Historical population
Year	Pop.	±% p.a.
1968	123	—
1975	112	−1.33%
1982	181	+7.10%
1990	211	+1.94%
1999	298	+3.91%
2007	304	+0.25%
2012	349	+2.80%
2017	314	−2.09%
2023	336	+1.14%
Source: INSEE

== Places of interest ==
- The church of St.Martin, dating from the nineteenth century.
- A windmill.
- Two 17th century farmhouses.

== See also ==
- Communes of the Pas-de-Calais department
