= Arrondissement of Boulogne-sur-Mer =

Coordinates: 50°44′N 1°37′E

Boulogne-sur-Mer
- Arrondissement
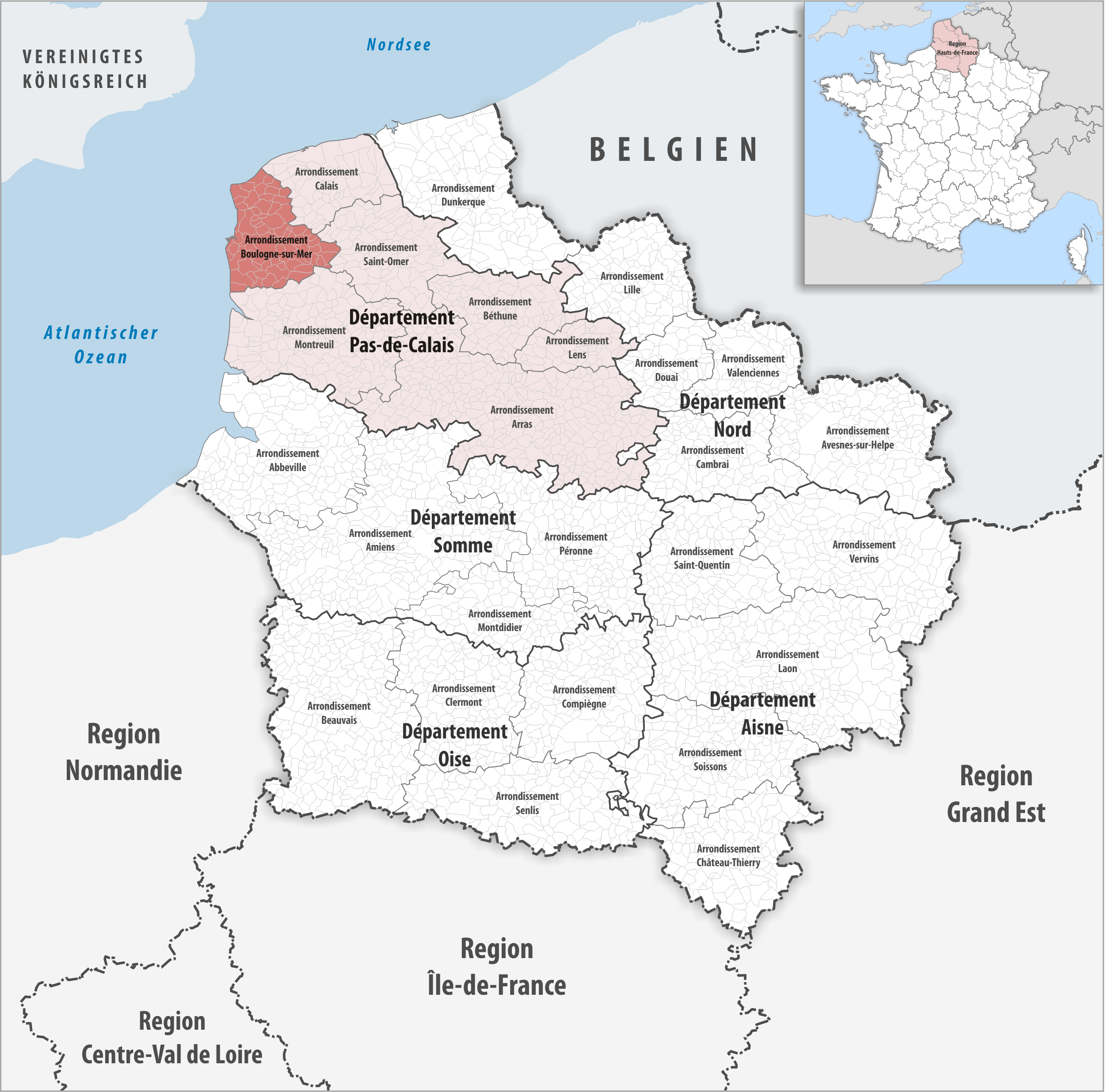
- Location within the region Hauts-de-France
- Country: France
- Region: Hauts-de-France
- Department: Pas-de-Calais
- No. of communes: {{{nbcomm}}}
- Area: 633.7 km^{2} (244.7 sq mi)
- Population (2023): 157,215
  - Density: 248.1/km^{2} (642.6/sq mi)
- INSEE code: 623

The arrondissement of Boulogne-sur-Mer is an arrondissement of France in the Pas-de-Calais department in the Hauts-de-France region. It has 74 communes. Its population is 157,817 (2021), and its area is 633.7 km^{2} (244.7 sq mi).

== Composition ==
The communes of the arrondissement of Boulogne-sur-Mer, and their INSEE codes, are:

1. Alincthun (62022)
2. Ambleteuse (62025)
3. Audembert (62052)
4. Audinghen (62054)
5. Audresselles (62056)
6. Baincthun (62075)
7. Bazinghen (62089)
8. Bellebrune (62104)
9. Belle-et-Houllefort (62105)
10. Beuvrequen (62125)
11. Boulogne-sur-Mer (62160)
12. Bournonville (62165)
13. Brunembert (62179)
14. Carly (62214)
15. Colembert (62230)
16. Condette (62235)
17. Conteville-lès-Boulogne (62237)
18. Courset (62251)
19. Crémarest (62255)
20. Dannes (62264)
21. Desvres (62268)
22. Doudeauville (62273)
23. Echinghen (62281)
24. Équihen-Plage (62300)
25. Ferques (62329)
26. Halinghen (62402)
27. Henneveux (62429)
28. Hervelinghen (62444)
29. Hesdigneul-lès-Boulogne (62446)
30. Hesdin-l'Abbé (62448)
31. Isques (62474)
32. La Capelle-lès-Boulogne (62908)
33. Lacres (62483)
34. Landrethun-le-Nord (62487)
35. Le Portel (62667)
36. Le Wast (62880)
37. Leubringhen (62503)
38. Leulinghen-Bernes (62505)
39. Longfossé (62524)
40. Longueville (62526)
41. Lottinghen (62530)
42. Maninghen-Henne (62546)
43. Marquise (62560)
44. Menneville (62566)
45. Nabringhen (62599)
46. Nesles (62603)
47. Neufchâtel-Hardelot (62604)
48. Offrethun (62636)
49. Outreau (62643)
50. Pernes-lès-Boulogne (62653)
51. Pittefaux (62658)
52. Quesques (62678)
53. Questrecques (62679)
54. Rety (62705)
55. Rinxent (62711)
56. Saint-Étienne-au-Mont (62746)
57. Saint-Inglevert (62751)
58. Saint-Léonard (62755)
59. Saint-Martin-Boulogne (62758)
60. Saint-Martin-Choquel (62759)
61. Samer (62773)
62. Selles (62786)
63. Senlecques (62789)
64. Tardinghen (62806)
65. Tingry (62821)
66. Verlincthun (62845)
67. Vieil-Moutier (62853)
68. Wacquinghen (62867)
69. Wierre-au-Bois (62888)
70. Wierre-Effroy (62889)
71. Wimereux (62893)
72. Wimille (62894)
73. Wirwignes (62896)
74. Wissant (62899)

== History ==
The arrondissement of Boulogne-sur-Mer was created in 1800. The arrondissement of Calais was created in 1962 from part of the arrondissement of Boulogne-sur-Mer. At the January 2017 reorganisation of the arrondissements of Pas-de-Calais, it lost one commune to the arrondissement of Calais.

As a result of the reorganisation of the cantons of France which came into effect in 2015, the borders of the cantons are no longer related to the borders of the arrondissements. The cantons of the arrondissement of Boulogne-sur-Mer were, as of January 2015:

1. Boulogne-sur-Mer-Nord-Est
2. Boulogne-sur-Mer-Nord-Ouest
3. Boulogne-sur-Mer-Sud
4. Desvres
5. Marquise
6. Outreau
7. Le Portel
8. Samer

=== Sub-prefects ===
- Joseph Masclet (14 Floréal an VIII, 4 May 1800)
- Antoine Pugliesi-Conti (1866)
- Charles Lutaud (10 April 1884)
