= Antoine Pugliesi-Conti =

- Born: 4 October 1827; Ajaccio, Corsica
- Died: 10 February 1908 (aged 80); Ajaccio
- Occupation: French prefect

Antoine Pugliesi-Conti (1827–1908) was a French administrator who was Prefect of Vendée during the Second Empire.

He is born on 4 October 1827 in Ajaccio, Corsica, and died on 10 February 1908 in the same city.

== Family ==
He married (29 September 1860, in Ajaccio) Stéphanie, daughter of Charles Étienne Conti (1812–1872).

As his father-in-law had no male heirs, Antoine Pugliesi became Antoine Pugliesi-Conti by adding Conti to his name by décret impérial (imperial decree) of 25 January 1867.

His children were:

1. Paul Pugliesi-Conti (1861–1933) député (deputy) of Seine,
2. Dominique Pugliesi-Conti (1863–1926) député (deputy) of Corsica,
3. Henri Pugliesi-Conti (1866–1936), Vice-admiral.

== Career ==
- Conseiller de préfecture (i. e. member of a conseil de préfecture) of Ardennes in Mézières City now part of Charleville-Mézières City (1860).
- Sub-prefect of Saint-Pons (former arrondissement of Saint-Pons suppressed in 1926) in Saint-Pons City now Saint-Pons-de-Thomières City, Hérault (1861).
- Secretary General (secrétaire général de préfecture) of Loiret, in Orléans City (1865).
- Sub-prefect of Louviers (former arrondissement of Louviers suppressed in 1926) in Louviers City, Eure (1865).
- Sub-prefect of Boulogne-sur-Mer, in Boulogne-sur-Mer City, Pas-de-Calais (1866).
- Prefect of Vendée in Napoléon-Vendée City now La Roche-sur-Yon City (1869).

== Sources, Notes, References ==
- (in French) "Pugliesi-Conti (Antoine, François)" (1827–1908), page 593 in Archives nationales (France) (répertoire nominatif par Christiane Lamoussière, revu et complété par Patrick Laharie; répertoire territorial et introduction par Patrick Laharie), Le Personnel de l’administration préfectorale, 1800–1880, Paris : Centre historique des Archives nationales, 1998, 1159 pages, 27 cm, ISBN 2-86000-271-5.

Antoine Pugliesi-Conti French Prefect Born: 1827
Political offices
Preceded by Jean-Jacques de Fonbrune	Prefect of Vendée; 1869–1870	Succeeded by Georges Coulon
