= Canton of Le Portel =

Coordinates: 50°42′59″N 1°35′39″E

Le Portel
- Former canton
- Interactive map of Le Portel
- Country: France
- Region: Hauts-de-France
- Department: Pas-de-Calais
- No. of communes: {{{nbcomm}}}
- Disbanded: 2015
- Population (2012): 18,640

The canton of Le Portel is a former canton situated in the department of the Pas-de-Calais and in the Nord-Pas-de-Calais region of northern France. It was disbanded following the French canton reorganisation which came into effect in March 2015. It consisted of 2 communes, which joined the canton of Boulogne-sur-Mer-2 in 2015. It had a total of 18,640 inhabitants (2012).

== Geography ==
The canton is organised around Le Portel in the arrondissement of Boulogne-sur-Mer. The altitude varies from 0m to 110m at Boulogne-sur-Mer for an average altitude of 12m.

The canton comprised 2 communes:

- Boulogne-sur-Mer (partly)
- Le Portel

== See also ==
- Cantons of Pas-de-Calais
- Communes of Pas-de-Calais
- Arrondissements of the Pas-de-Calais department
