= Bazinghen =

- Commune
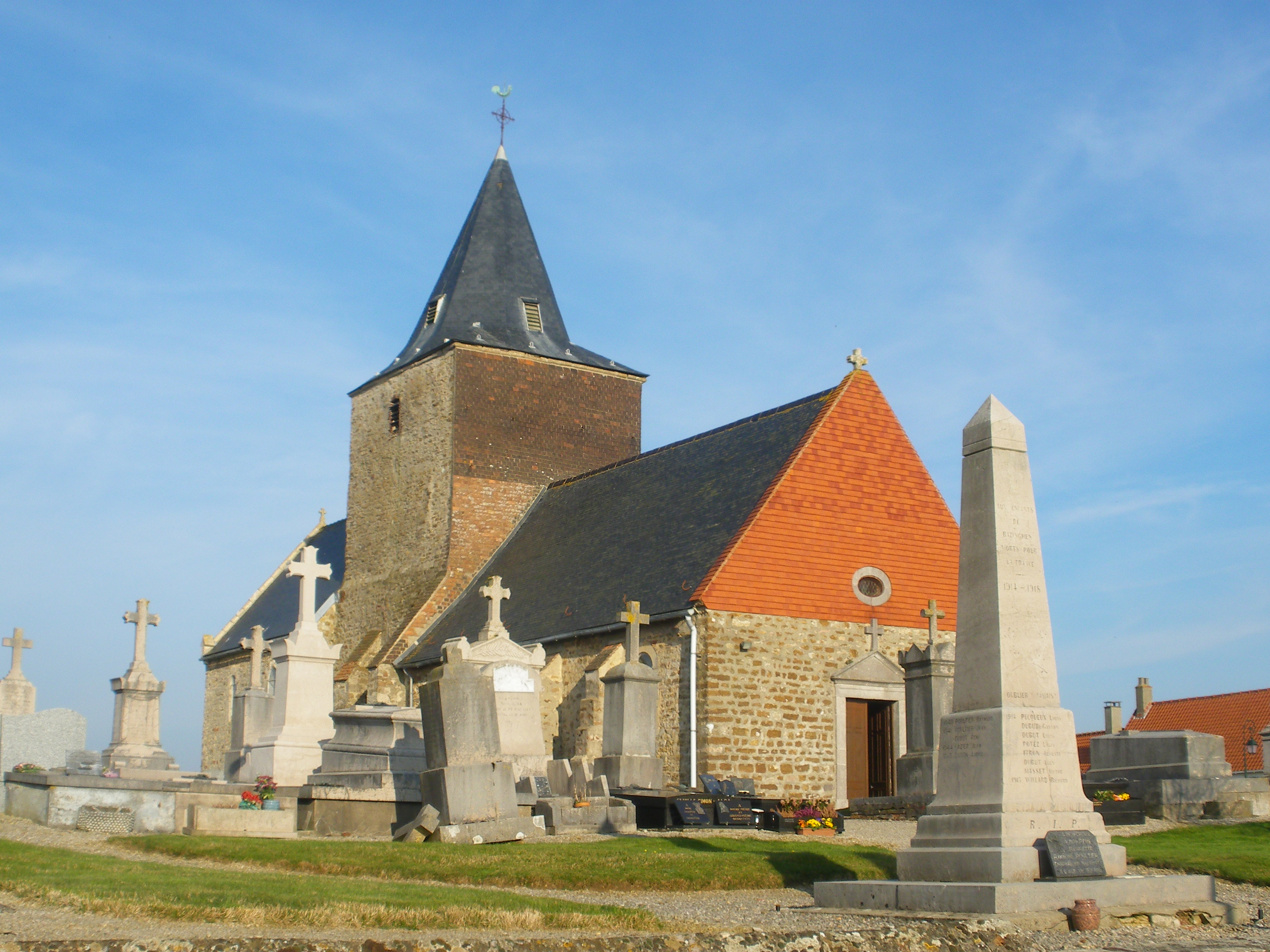
- The church of Bazinghen

- Coat of arms
- Location of Bazinghen
- Location within France Location within Hauts-de-France
- Coordinates: 50°49′34″N 1°39′48″E
- Country: France
- Region: Hauts-de-France
- Department: Pas-de-Calais
- Arrondissement: Boulogne-sur-Mer
- Canton: Desvres
- Intercommunality: CC Terre des Deux Caps

Government
  - Mayor (2020–2026): Franck Parenty
- Area^{1}: 13.2 km^{2} (5.1 sq mi)
- Elevation: 76 m (249 ft)
- Highest elevation: 122 m (400 ft)
- Lowest elevation: 3 m (9.8 ft)
- Population (2023): 410
  - Density: 31/km^{2} (80/sq mi)
- Time zone: UTC+01:00 (CET)
  - Summer (DST): UTC+02:00 (CEST)
- INSEE/Postal code: 62089 /62250
- ^{1} French Land Register data, which excludes lakes, ponds, glaciers > 1 km^{2} (0.386 sq mi or 247 acres) and river estuaries.

Bazinghen (French pronunciation: [bazɛ̃ɡɑ̃]; Picard: Bazinghin) is a commune in the Pas-de-Calais department in the Hauts-de-France region in northern France.

== Geography ==
A small farming commune, some 8 miles (13 km) northeast of Boulogne, at the junction of the D191 and the D191e roads.

== History ==
The community's existence was first attested to in 877 AD, and was referred to as Basingahem.

== Population ==
Historical population
Year	Pop.	±% p.a.
1968	207	—
1975	210	+0.21%
1982	254	+2.75%
1990	298	+2.02%
1999	344	+1.61%
2007	418	+2.47%
2012	419	+0.05%
2017	393	−1.27%
2023	410	+0.71%
Source: INSEE

== Sights ==
- The ruins of a watermill.
- The church of St. Eloi, dating from the eleventh century.
- A seventeenth century manorhouse at Colincthun.

== See also ==
- Communes of the Pas-de-Calais department
