= Canton of Desvres =

Coordinates: 50°42′12″N 1°51′09″E

Desvres
- Canton
- Location of Desvres within the department
- Country: France
- Region: Hauts-de-France
- Department: Pas-de-Calais
- No. of communes: {{{nbcomm}}}
- Area: 428.60 km^{2} (165.48 sq mi)
- Population (2023): 45,568
  - Density: 106.32/km^{2} (275.36/sq mi)
- INSEE code: 62 22

The canton of Desvres is a canton situated in the department of the Pas-de-Calais and in the Hauts-de-France region of northern France. The canton is organised around Desvres in the arrondissement of Boulogne-sur-Mer.

== Composition ==
At the French canton reorganisation which came into effect in March 2015, the canton was expanded from 23 to 52 communes:

- Alincthun
- Ambleteuse
- Audembert
- Audinghen
- Audresselles
- Bazinghen
- Bellebrune
- Belle-et-Houllefort
- Beuvrequen
- Bournonville
- Brunembert
- Carly
- Colembert
- Courset
- Crémarest
- Desvres
- Doudeauville
- Ferques
- Halinghen
- Henneveux
- Hervelinghen
- Lacres
- Landrethun-le-Nord
- Leubringhen
- Leulinghen-Bernes
- Longfossé
- Longueville
- Lottinghen
- Maninghen-Henne
- Marquise
- Menneville
- Nabringhen
- Offrethun
- Quesques
- Questrecques
- Rety
- Rinxent
- Saint-Inglevert
- Saint-Martin-Choquel
- Samer
- Selles
- Senlecques
- Tardinghen
- Tingry
- Verlincthun
- Vieil-Moutier
- Wacquinghen
- Le Wast
- Wierre-au-Bois
- Wierre-Effroy
- Wirwignes
- Wissant

== Population ==
Historical population
Year	Pop.	±% p.a.
2013	44,410	—
2018	45,422	+0.45%
Source: INSEE

== See also ==
- Cantons of Pas-de-Calais
- Communes of Pas-de-Calais
- Arrondissements of the Pas-de-Calais department
