= Canton of Boulogne-sur-Mer-Nord-Ouest =

Coordinates: 50°44′53″N 1°36′47″E

Boulogne-sur-Mer-Nord-Ouest
- Former canton
- Interactive map of Boulogne-sur-Mer-Nord-Ouest
- Country: France
- Region: Hauts-de-France
- Department: Pas-de-Calais
- No. of communes: {{{nbcomm}}}
- Disbanded: 2015
- Population (2012): 19,157

The canton of Boulogne-sur-Mer-Nord-Ouest is a former canton situated in the department of the Pas-de-Calais and in the Nord-Pas-de-Calais region of northern France. It was disbanded following the French canton reorganisation which came into effect in March 2015. It consisted of 2 communes, which joined the canton of Boulogne-sur-Mer-1 in 2015. It had a total of 19,157 inhabitants (2012, without double counting).

== Geography ==
The canton is organised around Boulogne-sur-Mer in the arrondissement of Boulogne-sur-Mer. The altitude varies from 0m to 110m in Boulogne-sur-Mer for an average altitude of 12m.

The canton comprised 2 communes:

- Boulogne-sur-Mer (partly)
- Wimereux

== See also ==
- Cantons of Pas-de-Calais
- Communes of Pas-de-Calais
- Arrondissements of the Pas-de-Calais department
