= Wacquinghen =

Wacquinghen Wakingem (West Flemish)
- Commune
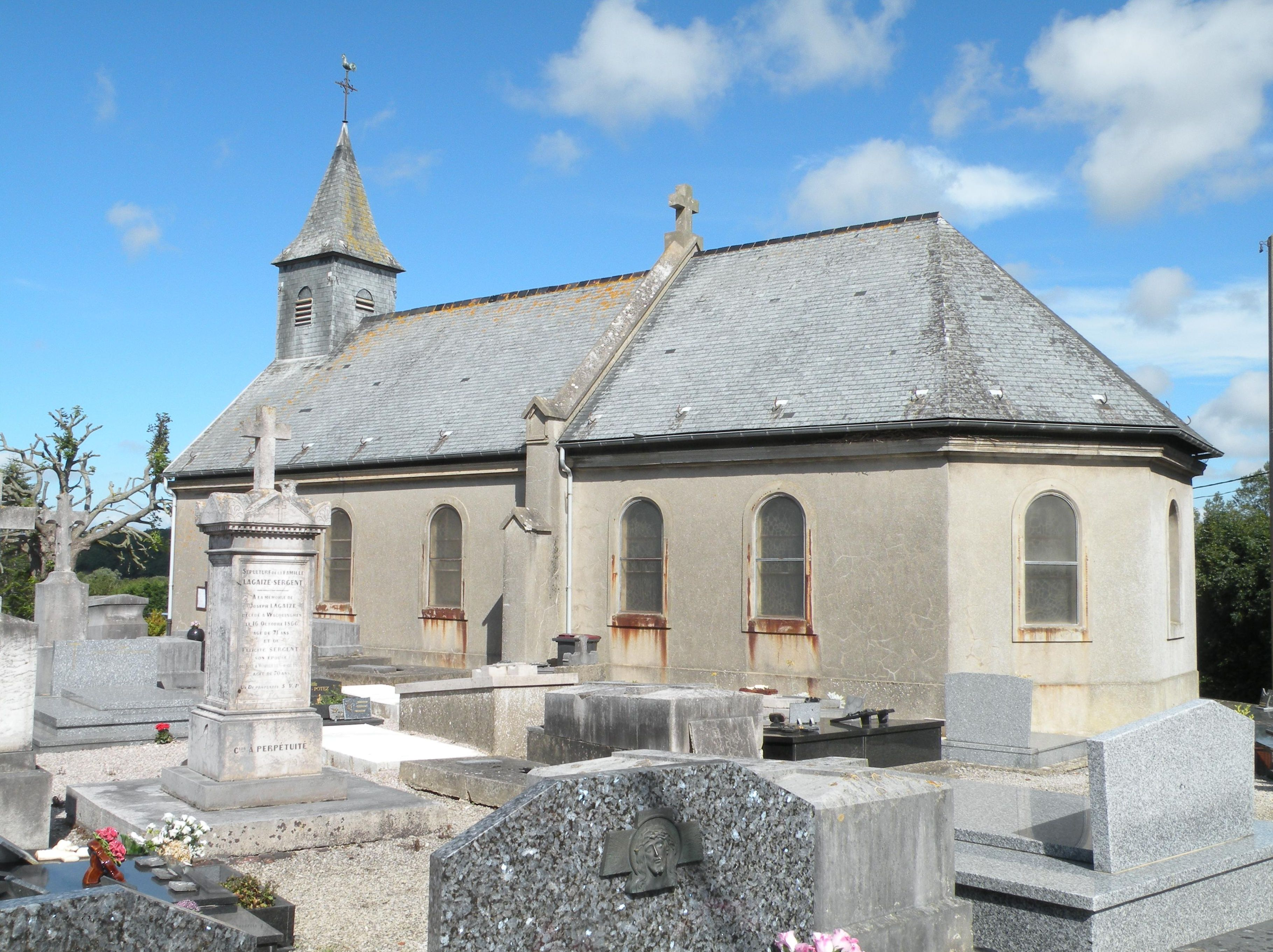
- The church of Wacquinghen

- Coat of arms
- Location of Wacquinghen
- Location within France Location within Hauts-de-France
- Coordinates: 50°47′00″N 1°40′00″E
- Country: France
- Region: Hauts-de-France
- Department: Pas-de-Calais
- Arrondissement: Boulogne-sur-Mer
- Canton: Desvres
- Intercommunality: Terre des Deux Caps

Government
  - Mayor (2020–2026): Denis Gavois
- Area^{1}: 2.47 km^{2} (0.95 sq mi)
- Elevation: 61 m (200 ft)
- Highest elevation: 96 m (315 ft)
- Lowest elevation: 32 m (105 ft)
- Population (2023): 259
  - Density: 105/km^{2} (272/sq mi)
- Time zone: UTC+01:00 (CET)
  - Summer (DST): UTC+02:00 (CEST)
- INSEE/Postal code: 62867 /62250
- ^{1} French Land Register data, which excludes lakes, ponds, glaciers > 1 km^{2} (0.386 sq mi or 247 acres) and river estuaries.

Wacquinghen (French pronunciation: [wakɛ̃ɡɑ̃]; West Flemish: Wakingem) is a commune in the Pas-de-Calais department in the Hauts-de-France region of France.

== Geography ==
Wacquinghen is situated some 7 miles (11 km) north of Boulogne, at the junction of the D233e and D242e3 roads. The A16 autoroute forms the western border of the commune.

== Population ==
Historical population
Year	Pop.	±% p.a.
1968	122	—
1975	124	+0.23%
1982	165	+4.17%
1990	188	+1.64%
1999	236	+2.56%
2007	235	−0.05%
2012	244	+0.75%
2017	262	+1.43%
2023	259	−0.19%
Source: INSEE

== Places of interest ==
- The church of St. Antoine, dating from the twentieth century.
- An eighteenth-century chateau.

== See also ==
- Communes of the Pas-de-Calais department
