= Bournonville, Pas-de-Calais =

Bournonville
- Commune
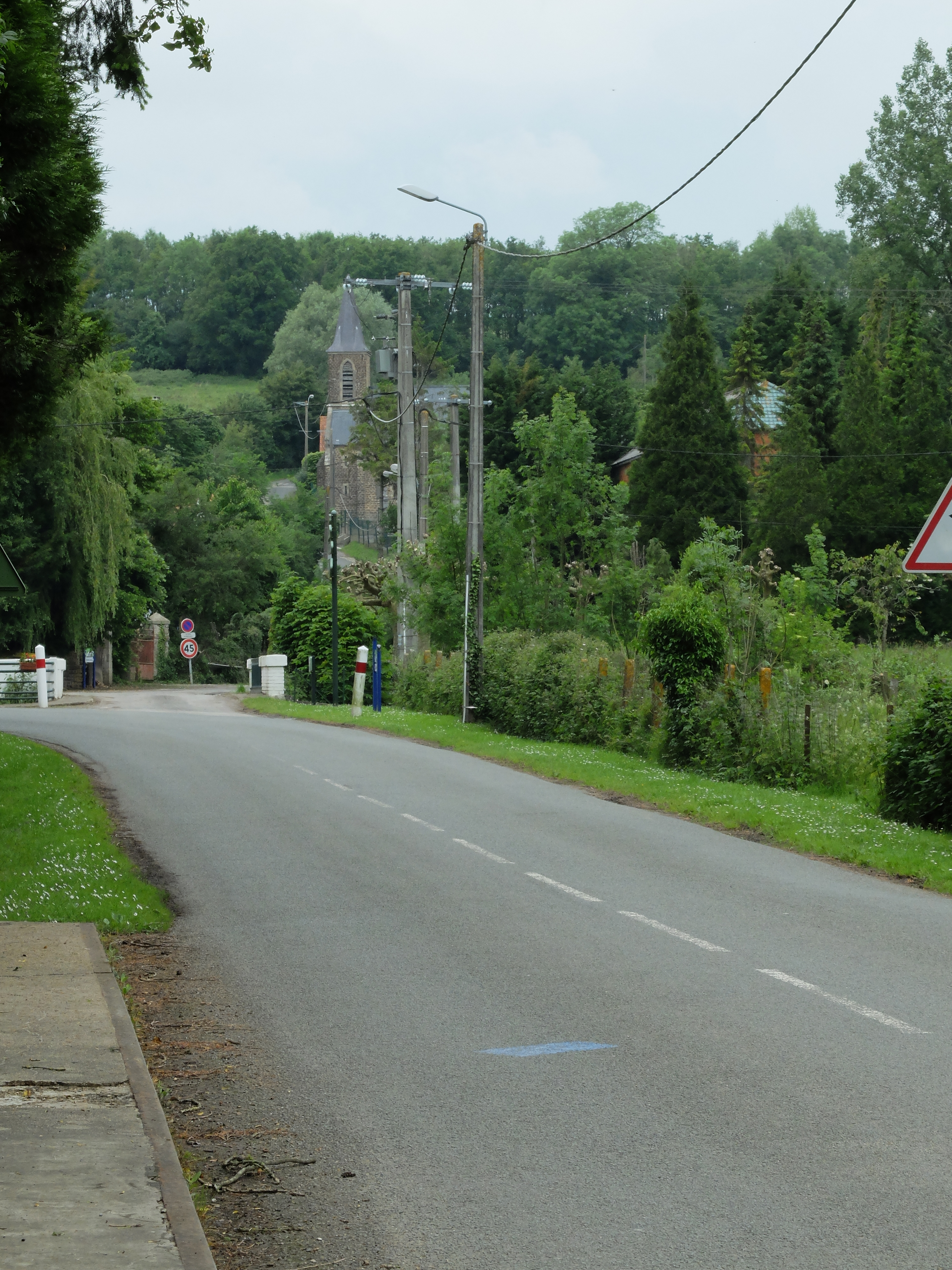
- The church seen from the town hall

- Coat of arms
- Location of Bournonville
- Location within France Location within Hauts-de-France
- Coordinates: 50°42′21″N 1°51′03″E
- Country: France
- Region: Hauts-de-France
- Department: Pas-de-Calais
- Arrondissement: Boulogne-sur-Mer
- Canton: Desvres
- Intercommunality: CC Desvres-Samer

Government
  - Mayor (2020–2026): Vincent Lachere
- Area^{1}: 8.71 km^{2} (3.36 sq mi)
- Elevation: 45 m (148 ft)
- Highest elevation: 125 m (410 ft)
- Lowest elevation: 36 m (118 ft)
- Population (2023): 223
  - Density: 25.6/km^{2} (66.3/sq mi)
- Time zone: UTC+01:00 (CET)
  - Summer (DST): UTC+02:00 (CEST)
- INSEE/Postal code: 62165 /62240
- ^{1} French Land Register data, which excludes lakes, ponds, glaciers > 1 km^{2} (0.386 sq mi or 247 acres) and river estuaries.

Bournonville (French pronunciation: [buʁnɔ̃vil]) is a commune in the Pas-de-Calais department in the Hauts-de-France region in northern France.

== Geography ==
A small farming commune, some 10 miles (16 km) east of Boulogne, at the junction of the D253 and the D254 roads, by the banks of the river Liane.

== Population ==
Historical population
Year	Pop.	±% p.a.
1968	200	—
1975	200	+0.00%
1982	196	−0.29%
1990	180	−1.06%
1999	211	+1.78%
2007	226	+0.86%
2012	235	+0.78%
2017	240	+0.42%
2023	223	−1.22%
Source: INSEE

== Sights ==
- The church of St. Laurent, dating from the seventeenth century.

== See also ==
- Communes of the Pas-de-Calais department
