= Communauté de communes de Desvres-Samer =

Federation of municipalities in France

Desvres-Samer
- Communauté de communes
- Interactive map of Desvres-Samer
- Coordinates: 50°41′N 01°50′E
- Country: France
- Region: Hauts-de-France
- Department: Pas-de-Calais
- No. of communes: {{{nbcomm}}}
- Established: 2009
- Area: 245.3 km^{2} (94.7 sq mi)
- Population (2018): 23,225
  - Density: 94.68/km^{2} (245.2/sq mi)

The Communauté de communes de Desvres-Samer is a communauté de communes, an intercommunal structure, in the Pas-de-Calais department, in the Hauts-de-France region, northern France. It was created in January 2009 by the merger of the former communautés de communes Pays de la Faïence de Desvres and Samer et environs. Its area is 245.3 km^{2}, and its population was 23,225 in 2018. Its seat is in Desvres.

== Composition ==
The communauté de communes consists of the following 31 communes:

1. Alincthun
2. Bellebrune
3. Belle-et-Houllefort
4. Bournonville
5. Brunembert
6. Carly
7. Colembert
8. Courset
9. Crémarest
10. Desvres
11. Doudeauville
12. Halinghen
13. Henneveux
14. Lacres
15. Longfossé
16. Longueville
17. Lottinghen
18. Menneville
19. Nabringhen
20. Quesques
21. Questrecques
22. Saint-Martin-Choquel
23. Samer
24. Selles
25. Senlecques
26. Tingry
27. Verlincthun
28. Vieil-Moutier
29. Le Wast
30. Wierre-au-Bois
31. Wirwignes
