= Menneville, Pas-de-Calais =

Menneville
- Commune
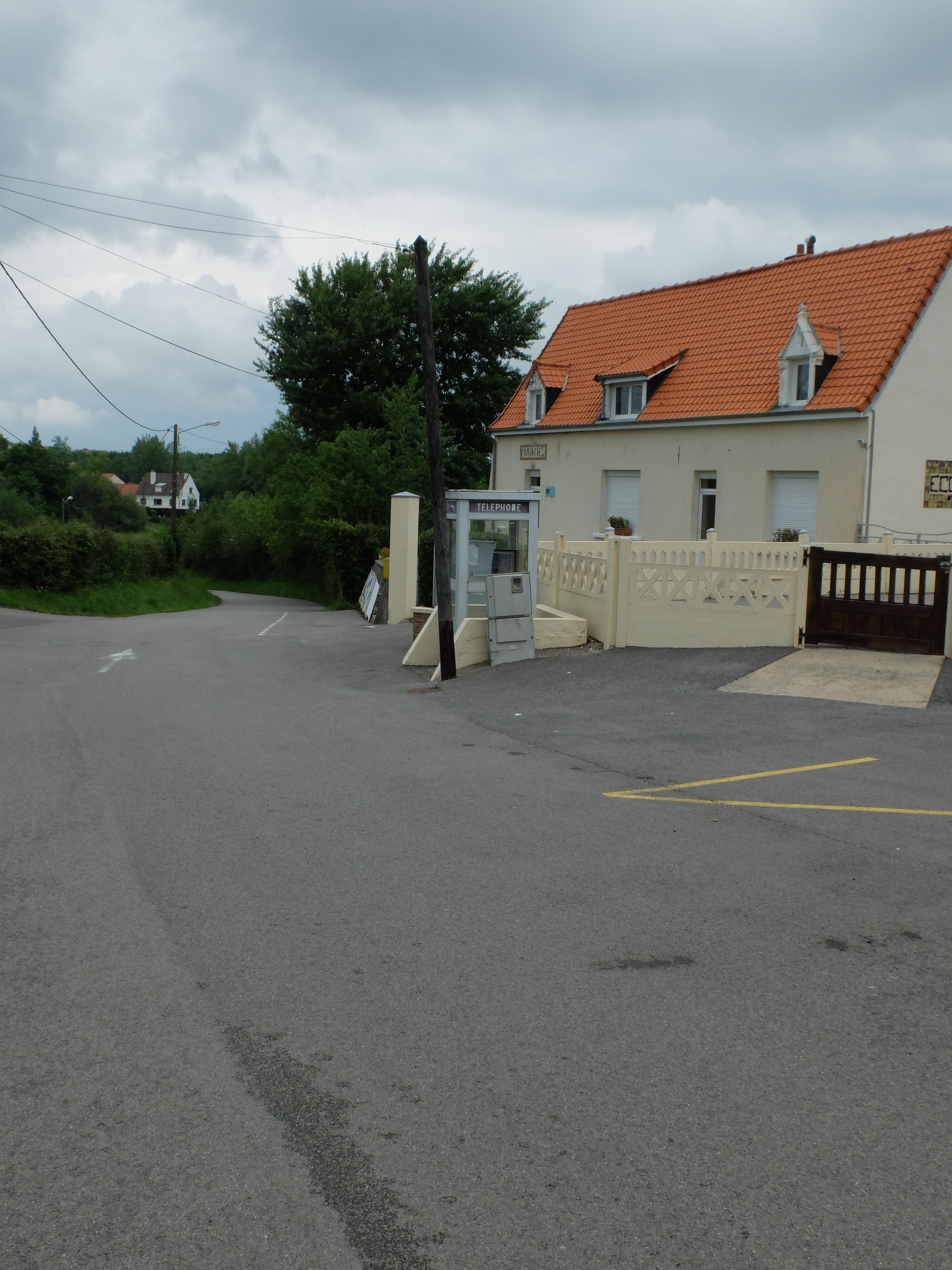
- A road in Menneville

- Coat of arms
- Location of Menneville
- Location within France Location within Hauts-de-France
- Coordinates: 50°40′32″N 1°51′45″E
- Country: France
- Region: Hauts-de-France
- Department: Pas-de-Calais
- Arrondissement: Boulogne-sur-Mer
- Canton: Desvres
- Intercommunality: CC Desvres-Samer

Government
  - Mayor (2020–2026): Michel Fournier
- Area^{1}: 5.27 km^{2} (2.03 sq mi)
- Elevation: 78 m (256 ft)
- Highest elevation: 206 m (676 ft)
- Lowest elevation: 65 m (213 ft)
- Population (2023): 670
  - Density: 130/km^{2} (330/sq mi)
- Time zone: UTC+01:00 (CET)
  - Summer (DST): UTC+02:00 (CEST)
- INSEE/Postal code: 62566 /62240
- ^{1} French Land Register data, which excludes lakes, ponds, glaciers > 1 km^{2} (0.386 sq mi or 247 acres) and river estuaries.

Menneville (French pronunciation: [mɛnvil]; Picard: Manneville) is a commune in the Pas-de-Calais department in the Hauts-de-France region of France about 12 miles (19 km) southeast of Boulogne.

== Population ==
Historical population
Year	Pop.	±% p.a.
1968	317	—
1975	347	+1.30%
1982	440	+3.45%
1990	605	+4.06%
1999	627	+0.40%
2007	671	+0.85%
2012	717	+1.33%
2017	700	−0.48%
2023	670	−0.73%
Source: INSEE

== See also ==
- Communes of the Pas-de-Calais department
