= Senlecques =

- Commune
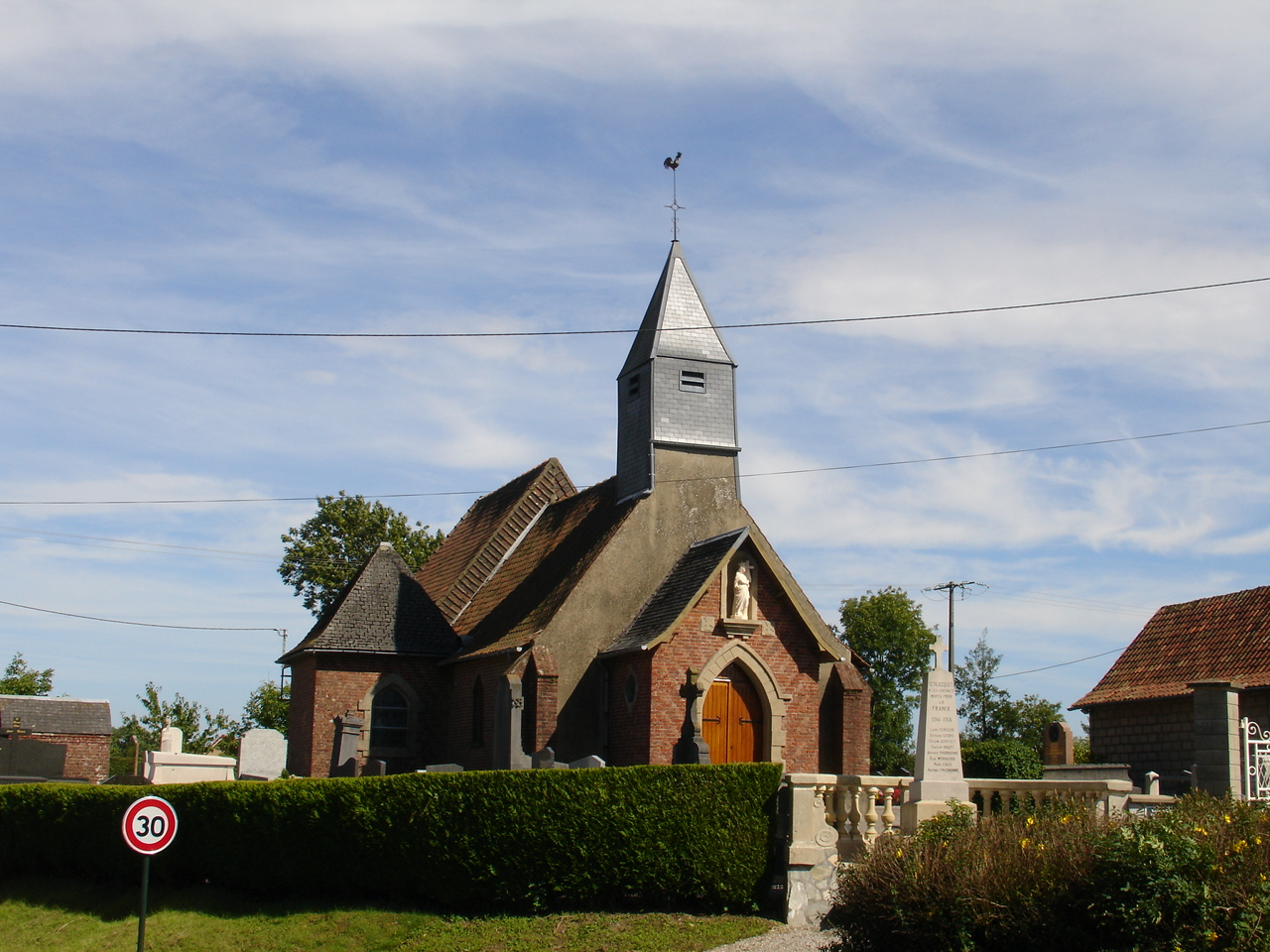
- The church of Senlecques

- Coat of arms
- Location of Senlecques
- Location within France Location within Hauts-de-France
- Coordinates: 50°38′50″N 1°56′11″E
- Country: France
- Region: Hauts-de-France
- Department: Pas-de-Calais
- Arrondissement: Boulogne-sur-Mer
- Canton: Desvres
- Intercommunality: CC Desvres-Samer

Government
  - Mayor (2020–2026): Christophe Fourcroy
- Area^{1}: 2.01 km^{2} (0.78 sq mi)
- Elevation: 190 m (620 ft)
- Highest elevation: 206 m (676 ft)
- Lowest elevation: 170 m (560 ft)
- Population (2023): 251
  - Density: 125/km^{2} (323/sq mi)
- Time zone: UTC+01:00 (CET)
  - Summer (DST): UTC+02:00 (CEST)
- INSEE/Postal code: 62789 /62240
- ^{1} French Land Register data, which excludes lakes, ponds, glaciers > 1 km^{2} (0.386 sq mi or 247 acres) and river estuaries.

Senlecques (French pronunciation: [sɑ̃lɛk]) is a commune in the Pas-de-Calais department in the Hauts-de-France region of France.

== Geography ==
Senlecques is situated some 15 miles (24 km) east of Boulogne, at the junction of the D254 and D341 roads.

== Population ==
Historical population
Year	Pop.	±% p.a.
1968	222	—
1975	235	+0.82%
1982	213	−1.39%
1990	226	+0.74%
1999	199	−1.40%
2007	233	+1.99%
2012	264	+2.53%
2017	269	+0.38%
2023	251	−1.15%
Source: INSEE

== Places of interest ==
- The church of St. Hélène, dating from the sixteenth century.
- A sixteenth century manorhouse.

== See also ==
- Communes of the Pas-de-Calais department
