= Brunembert =

Brunembert Bruinenberg
- Commune
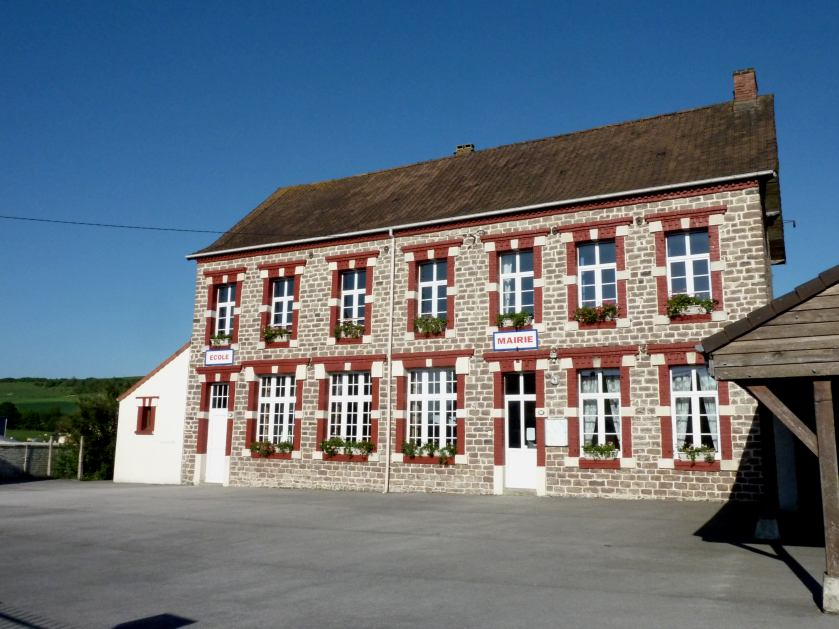
- The town hall and school of Brunembert

- Coat of arms
- Location of Brunembert
- Location within France Location within Hauts-de-France
- Coordinates: 50°42′51″N 1°53′39″E
- Country: France
- Region: Hauts-de-France
- Department: Pas-de-Calais
- Arrondissement: Boulogne-sur-Mer
- Canton: Desvres
- Intercommunality: CC Desvres-Samer

Government
  - Mayor (2020–2026): Philippe Delbarre
- Area^{1}: 6.11 km^{2} (2.36 sq mi)
- Elevation: 87 m (285 ft)
- Highest elevation: 180 m (590 ft)
- Lowest elevation: 47 m (154 ft)
- Population (2023): 387
  - Density: 63.3/km^{2} (164/sq mi)
- Time zone: UTC+01:00 (CET)
  - Summer (DST): UTC+02:00 (CEST)
- INSEE/Postal code: 62179 /62240
- ^{1} French Land Register data, which excludes lakes, ponds, glaciers > 1 km^{2} (0.386 sq mi or 247 acres) and river estuaries.

Brunembert (French pronunciation: [bʁynɑ̃bɛʁ]; West Flemish: Bruinenberg) is a commune in the Pas-de-Calais department in the Hauts-de-France region in northern France.

== Geography ==
A small farming commune, some 15 miles (24 km) east of Boulogne, at the junction of the D252 and the D215 roads.

== Population ==
Historical population
Year	Pop.	±% p.a.
1968	307	—
1975	298	−0.42%
1982	272	−1.30%
1990	255	−0.80%
1999	282	+1.12%
2007	358	+3.03%
2012	398	+2.14%
2017	418	+0.99%
2023	387	−1.28%
Source: INSEE

== Sights ==
- The church of St. Nicholas, dating from the fifteenth century.
- A fifteenth century watermill.
- Traces of two medieval castles.

== See also ==
- Communes of the Pas-de-Calais department
