= Nabringhen =

Nabringhen Nameringem
- Commune
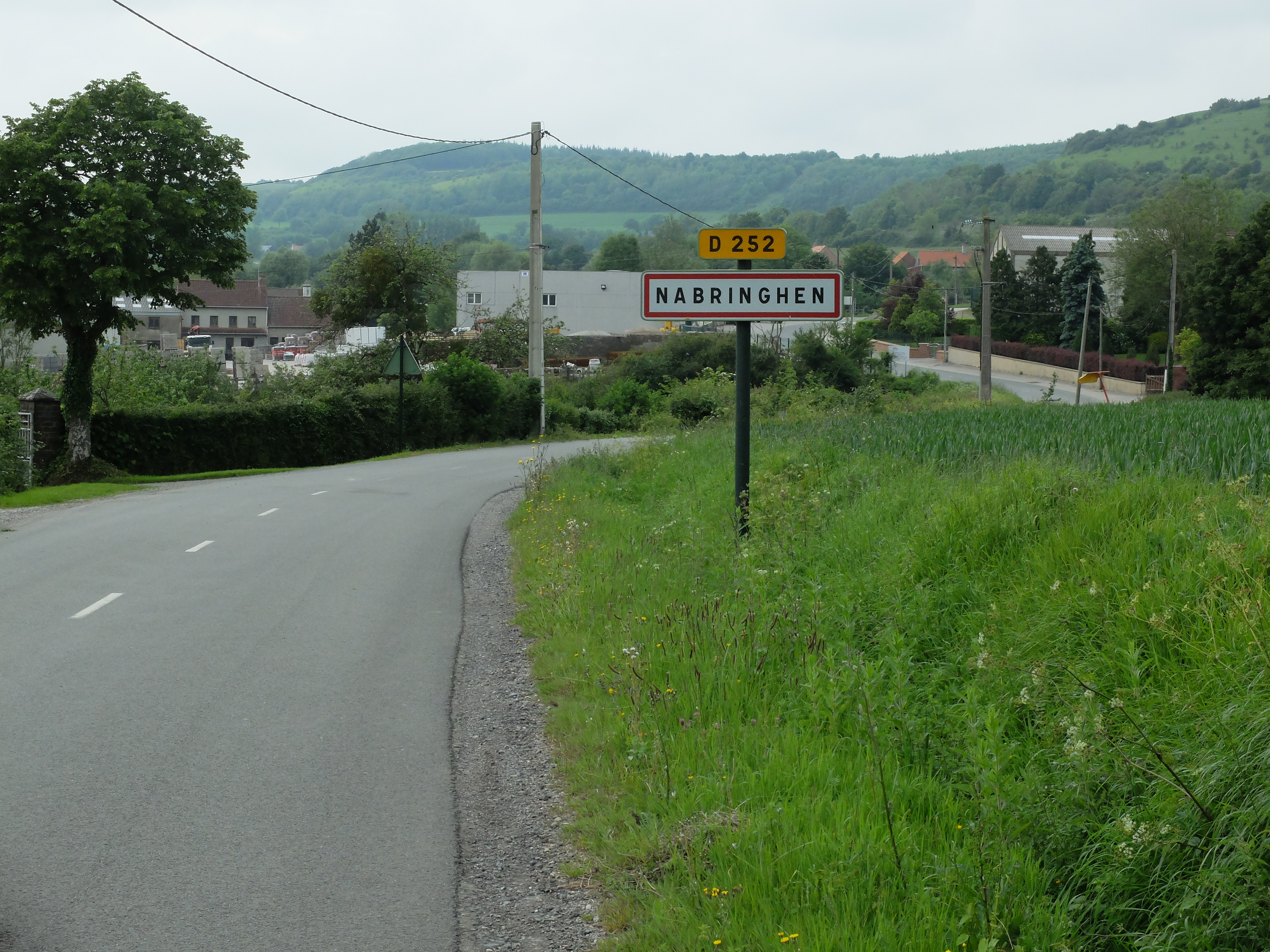
- The road into Nabringhen

- Coat of arms
- Location of Nabringhen
- Location within France Location within Hauts-de-France
- Coordinates: 50°44′42″N 1°51′46″E
- Country: France
- Region: Hauts-de-France
- Department: Pas-de-Calais
- Arrondissement: Boulogne-sur-Mer
- Canton: Desvres
- Intercommunality: Desvres-Samer

Government
  - Mayor (2020–2026): Hervé Brouart
- Area^{1}: 4.17 km^{2} (1.61 sq mi)
- Elevation: 125 m (410 ft)
- Highest elevation: 202 m (663 ft)
- Lowest elevation: 65 m (213 ft)
- Population (2023): 225
  - Density: 54.0/km^{2} (140/sq mi)
- Time zone: UTC+01:00 (CET)
  - Summer (DST): UTC+02:00 (CEST)
- INSEE/Postal code: 62599 /62142
- ^{1} French Land Register data, which excludes lakes, ponds, glaciers > 1 km^{2} (0.386 sq mi or 247 acres) and river estuaries.

Nabringhen (French pronunciation: [nabʁɛ̃ɡɑ̃]; West Flemish: Nameringem) is a commune in the Pas-de-Calais department in the Hauts-de-France region of France.

== Geography ==
Nabringhen is situated some 12 miles (19 km) east of Boulogne, at the junction of the N42 with the D224 and D206 roads.

== Population ==
Historical population
Year	Pop.	±% p.a.
1968	144	—
1975	165	+1.96%
1982	170	+0.43%
1990	154	−1.23%
1999	155	+0.07%
2007	163	+0.63%
2012	177	+1.66%
2017	212	+3.67%
2023	225	+1.00%
Source: INSEE

== Places of interest ==
- The church of St.Marguerite, dating from the sixteenth century.

== See also ==
- Communes of the Pas-de-Calais department
