= Courset =

- Commune
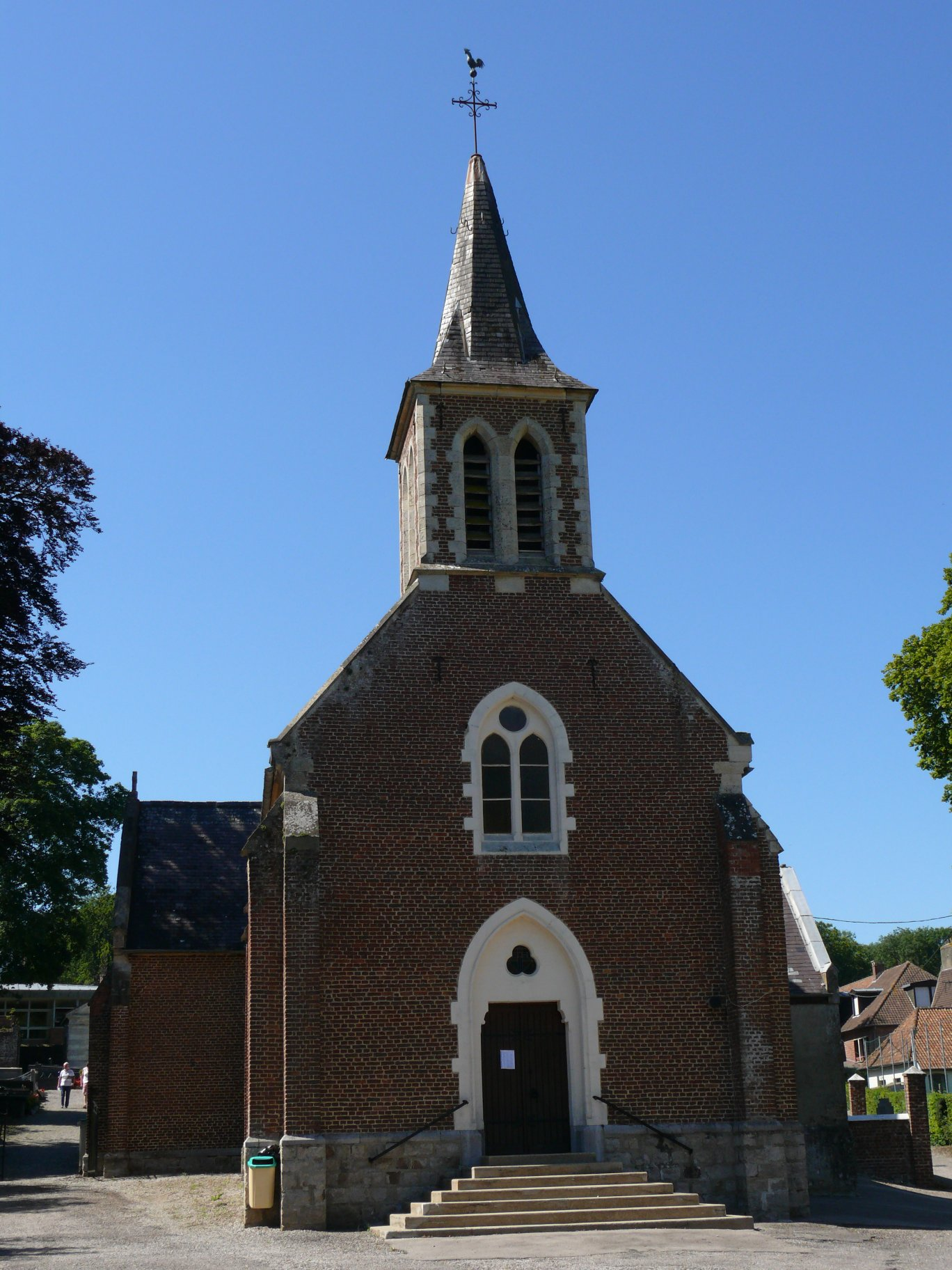
- The church of Courset

- Coat of arms
- Location of Courset
- Location within France Location within Hauts-de-France
- Coordinates: 50°38′49″N 1°50′32″E
- Country: France
- Region: Hauts-de-France
- Department: Pas-de-Calais
- Arrondissement: Boulogne-sur-Mer
- Canton: Desvres
- Intercommunality: CC Desvres-Samer

Government
  - Mayor (2020–2026): Marc Denavaut
- Area^{1}: 10.24 km^{2} (3.95 sq mi)
- Elevation: 118 m (387 ft)
- Highest elevation: 209 m (686 ft)
- Lowest elevation: 121 m (397 ft)
- Population (2023): 505
  - Density: 49.3/km^{2} (128/sq mi)
- Time zone: UTC+01:00 (CET)
  - Summer (DST): UTC+02:00 (CEST)
- INSEE/Postal code: 62251 /62240
- ^{1} French Land Register data, which excludes lakes, ponds, glaciers > 1 km^{2} (0.386 sq mi or 247 acres) and river estuaries.

Courset is a commune in the Pas-de-Calais department in the Hauts-de-France region of France about 12 miles (19 km) southeast of Boulogne.

== Population ==
Historical population
Year	Pop.	±% p.a.
1968	338	—
1975	363	+1.02%
1982	334	−1.18%
1990	365	+1.12%
1999	396	+0.91%
2007	445	+1.47%
2012	506	+2.60%
2017	515	+0.35%
2023	505	−0.33%
Source: INSEE

== See also ==
- Communes of the Pas-de-Calais department
