= Longfossé =

- Commune
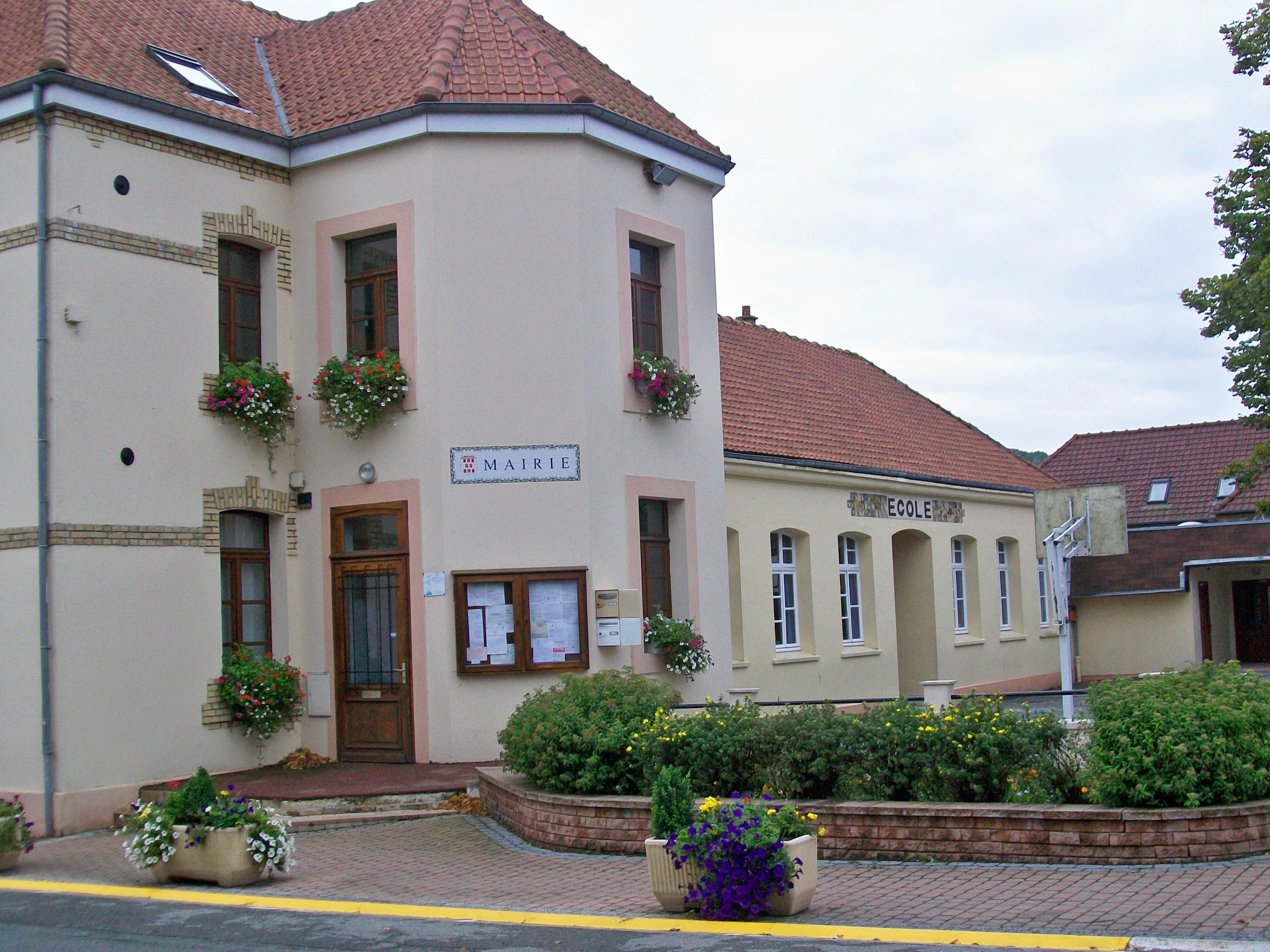
- The town hall and school of Longfossé

- Coat of arms
- Location of Longfossé
- Location within France Location within Hauts-de-France
- Coordinates: 50°39′10″N 1°48′23″E
- Country: France
- Region: Hauts-de-France
- Department: Pas-de-Calais
- Arrondissement: Boulogne-sur-Mer
- Canton: Desvres
- Intercommunality: CC Desvres-Samer

Government
  - Mayor (2020–2026): Anita Thomas
- Area^{1}: 10.22 km^{2} (3.95 sq mi)
- Elevation: 91 m (299 ft)
- Highest elevation: 207 m (679 ft)
- Lowest elevation: 39 m (128 ft)
- Population (2023): 1,528
  - Density: 149.5/km^{2} (387.2/sq mi)
- Time zone: UTC+01:00 (CET)
  - Summer (DST): UTC+02:00 (CEST)
- INSEE/Postal code: 62524 /62240
- ^{1} French Land Register data, which excludes lakes, ponds, glaciers > 1 km^{2} (0.386 sq mi or 247 acres) and river estuaries.

Longfossé (French pronunciation: [lɔ̃fose]) is a commune in the Pas-de-Calais department in the Hauts-de-France region of France.

== Geography ==
Longfossé is situated some 9 miles (14 km) southeast of Boulogne, at the junction of the D204 and D215 roads..

== Population ==
Historical population
Year	Pop.	±% p.a.
1968	1,151	—
1975	1,148	−0.04%
1982	1,160	+0.15%
1990	1,218	+0.61%
1999	1,226	+0.07%
2007	1,272	+0.46%
2012	1,420	+2.23%
2017	1,452	+0.45%
2023	1,528	+0.85%
Source: INSEE

== Places of interest ==
- The church of St.Pierre, dating from the seventeenth century.
- An eighteenth-century manorhouse.

== Gallery ==
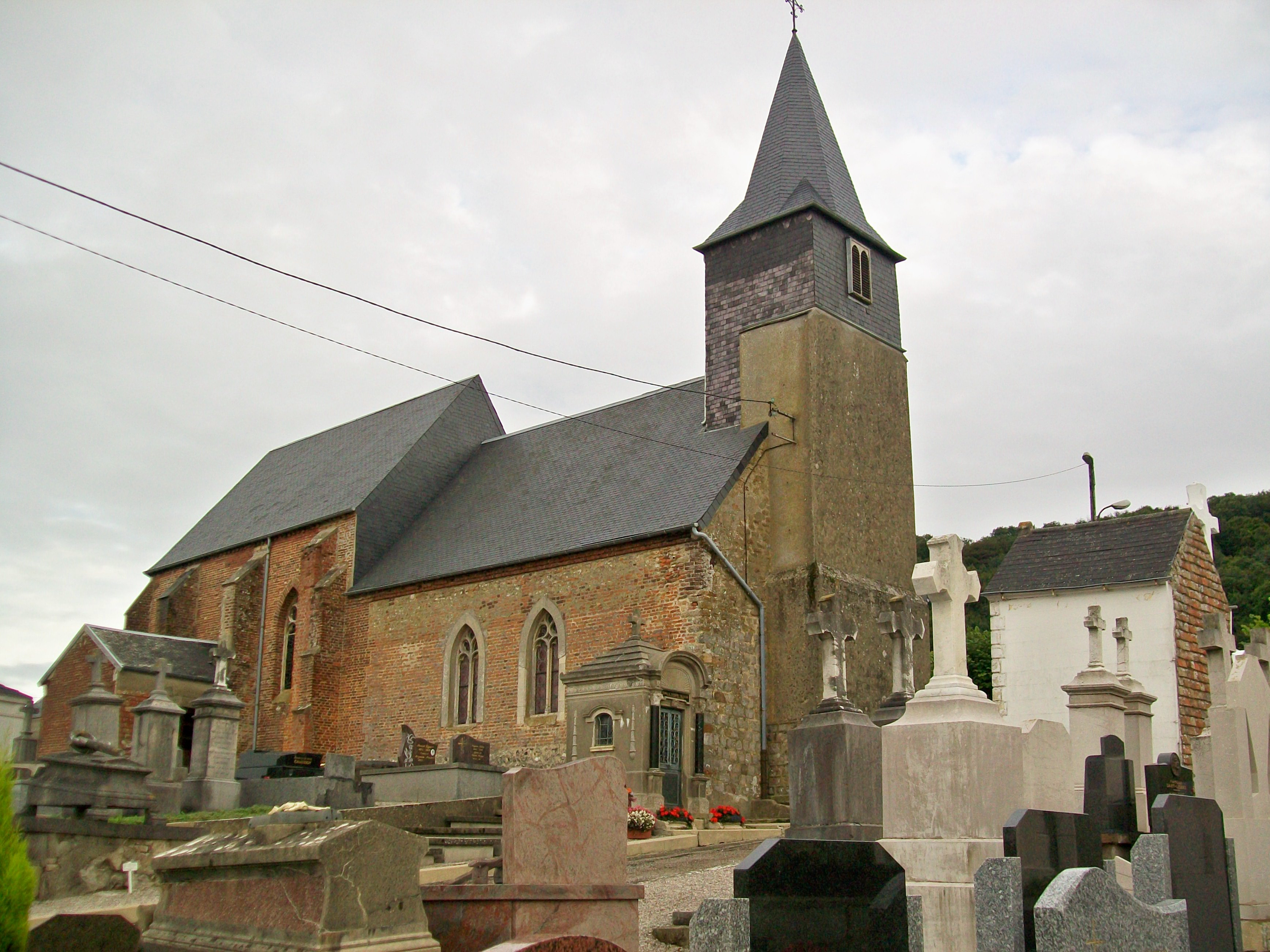
St.Pierre Church

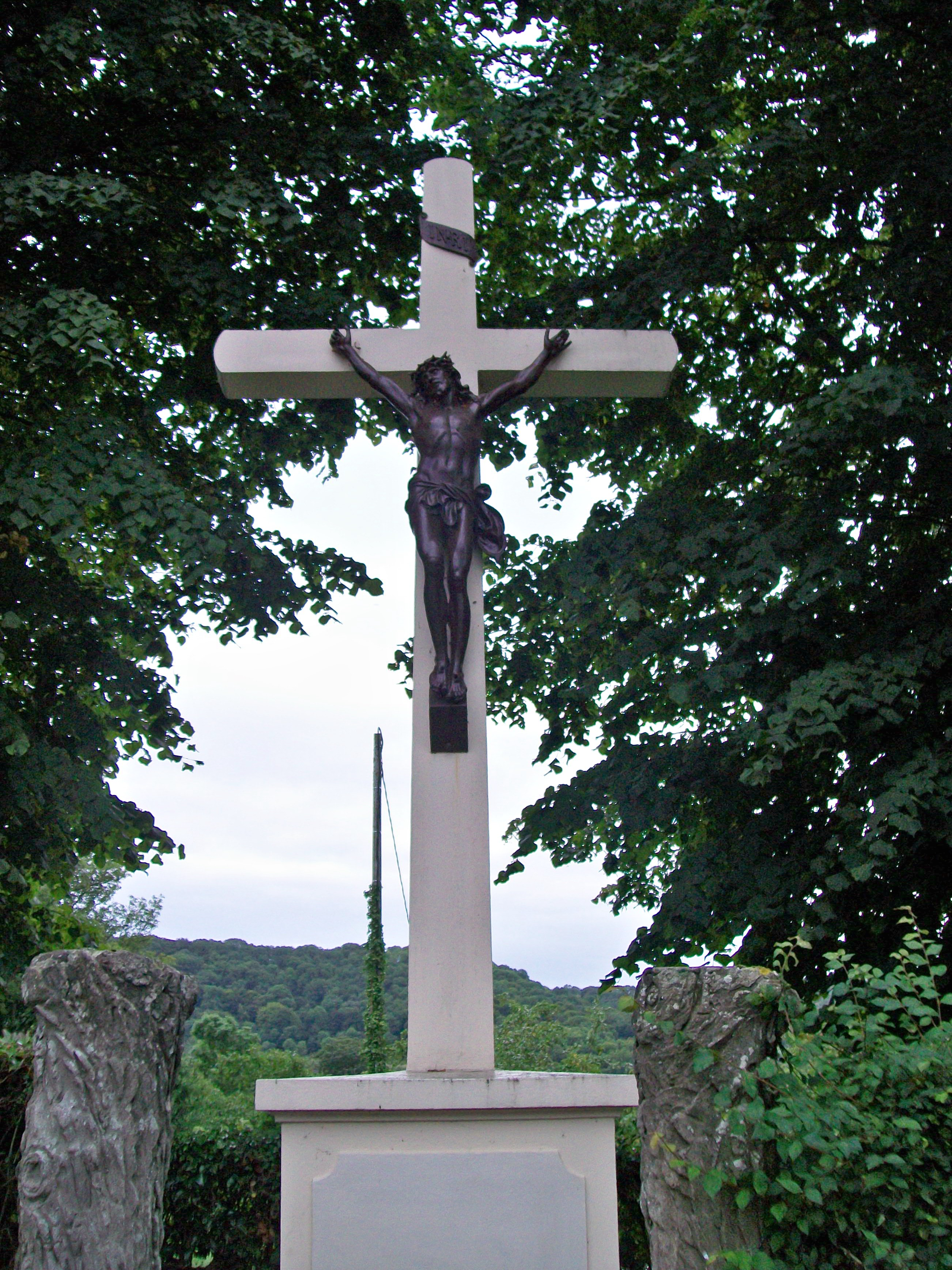
A crucifix in the town

== See also ==
- Communes of the Pas-de-Calais department
