= Saint-Martin-Choquel =

- Commune
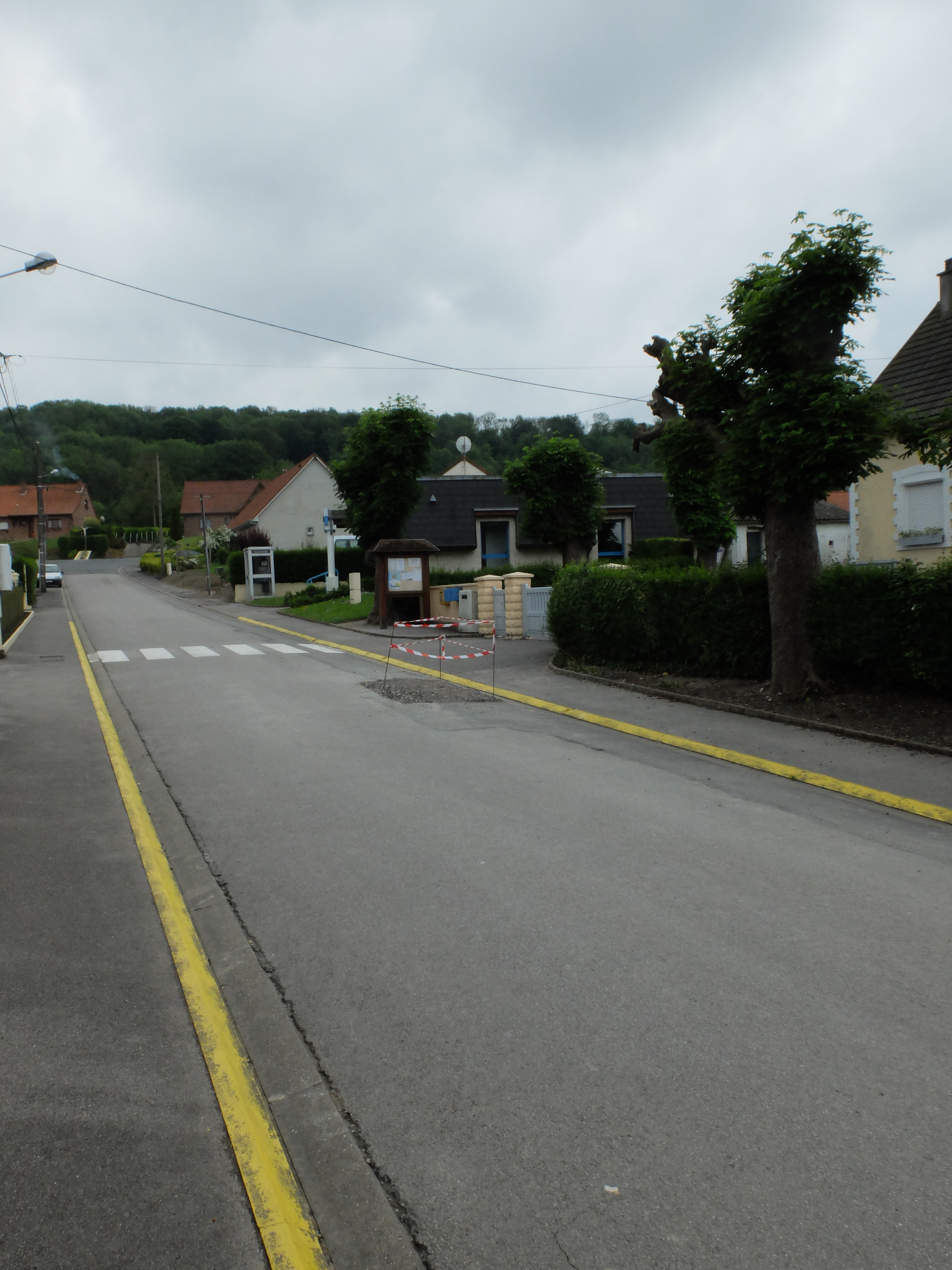
- A road within Saint-Martin-Choquel

- Coat of arms
- Location of Saint-Martin-Choquel
- Location within France Location within Hauts-de-France
- Coordinates: 50°40′20″N 1°52′51″E
- Country: France
- Region: Hauts-de-France
- Department: Pas-de-Calais
- Arrondissement: Boulogne-sur-Mer
- Canton: Desvres
- Intercommunality: CC Desvres-Samer

Government
  - Mayor (2021–2026): Patrick Quiertant
- Area^{1}: 6.18 km^{2} (2.39 sq mi)
- Elevation: 100 m (330 ft)
- Highest elevation: 204 m (669 ft)
- Lowest elevation: 75 m (246 ft)
- Population (2023): 443
  - Density: 71.7/km^{2} (186/sq mi)
- Time zone: UTC+01:00 (CET)
  - Summer (DST): UTC+02:00 (CEST)
- INSEE/Postal code: 62759 /62240
- ^{1} French Land Register data, which excludes lakes, ponds, glaciers > 1 km^{2} (0.386 sq mi or 247 acres) and river estuaries.

Saint-Martin-Choquel (French pronunciation: [sɛ̃ maʁtɛ̃ ʃɔkɛl]) is a commune in the Pas-de-Calais department in the Hauts-de-France region of France. about 13 miles (21 km) southeast of Boulogne.

== Population ==
Historical population
Year	Pop.	±% p.a.
1968	277	—
1975	304	+1.34%
1982	353	+2.16%
1990	344	−0.32%
1999	397	+1.60%
2007	440	+1.29%
2012	472	+1.41%
2017	482	+0.42%
2023	443	−1.40%
Source: INSEE

== See also ==
- Communes of the Pas-de-Calais department
