= Henneveux =

- Commune
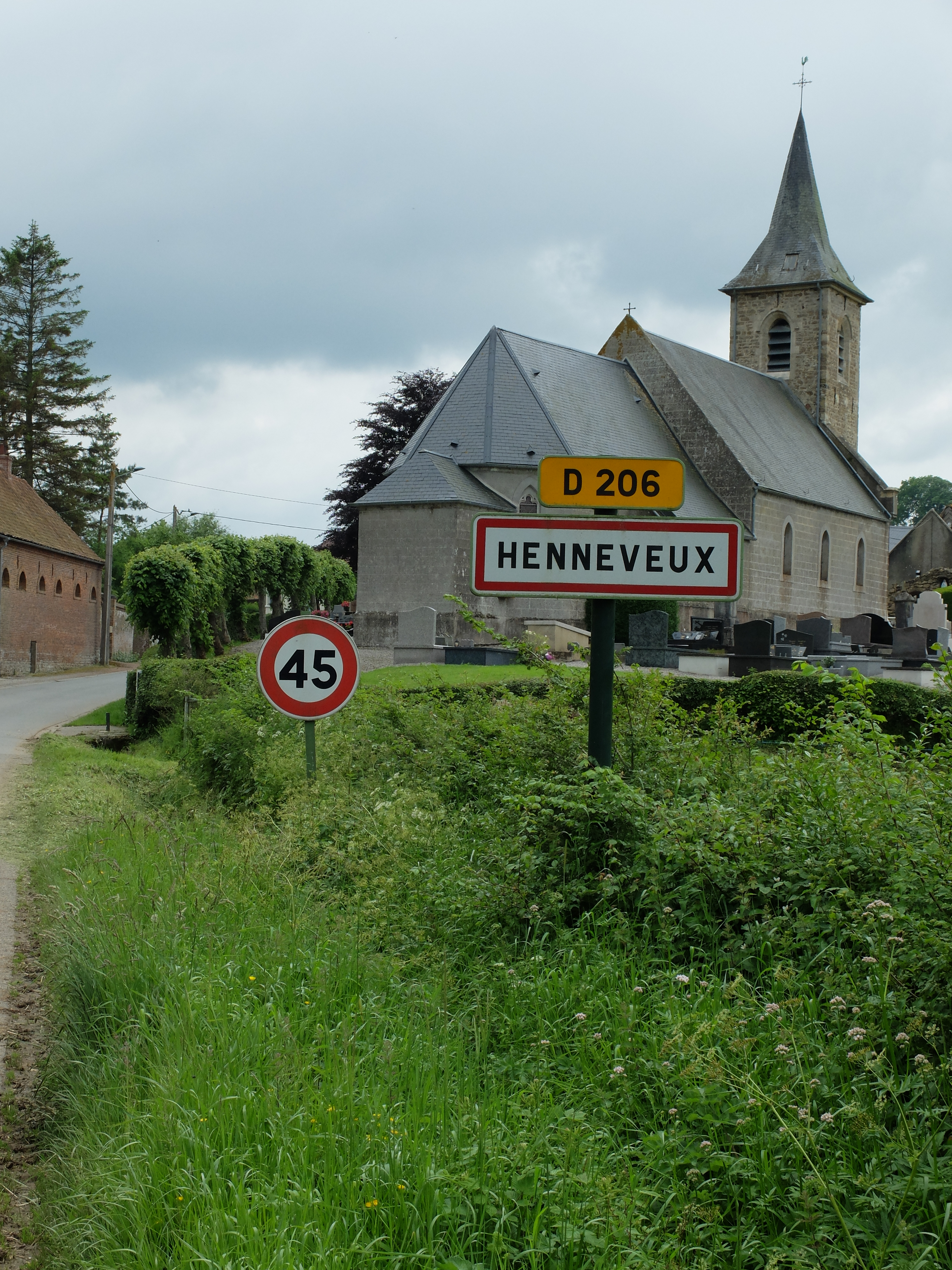
- The church of Henneveux

- Coat of arms
- Location of Henneveux
- Location within France Location within Hauts-de-France
- Coordinates: 50°43′26″N 1°51′07″E
- Country: France
- Region: Hauts-de-France
- Department: Pas-de-Calais
- Arrondissement: Boulogne-sur-Mer
- Canton: Desvres
- Intercommunality: CC Desvres-Samer

Government
  - Mayor (2020–2026): Jean-Claude Retaux
- Area^{1}: 5.49 km^{2} (2.12 sq mi)
- Elevation: 57 m (187 ft)
- Highest elevation: 126 m (413 ft)
- Lowest elevation: 49 m (161 ft)
- Population (2023): 272
  - Density: 49.5/km^{2} (128/sq mi)
- Time zone: UTC+01:00 (CET)
  - Summer (DST): UTC+02:00 (CEST)
- INSEE/Postal code: 62429 /62142
- ^{1} French Land Register data, which excludes lakes, ponds, glaciers > 1 km^{2} (0.386 sq mi or 247 acres) and river estuaries.

Henneveux (French pronunciation: [ɛnvø]; West Flemish: Hanevo) is a commune in the Pas-de-Calais department in the Hauts-de-France region of France about 8 miles (13 km) east of Boulogne-sur-Mer.

== Population ==
Historical population
| Year | Pop. | ±% p.a. |
|---|---|---|
| 1968 | 251 | — |
| 1975 | 246 | −0.29% |
| 1982 | 241 | −0.29% |
| 1990 | 232 | −0.47% |
| 1999 | 252 | +0.92% |
| 2007 | 301 | +2.25% |
| 2012 | 315 | +0.91% |
| 2017 | 300 | −0.97% |
| 2023 | 272 | −1.62% |
Source: INSEE

== See also ==
- Communes of the Pas-de-Calais department
