= Wierre-au-Bois =

Wierre-au-Bois Wilder
- Commune
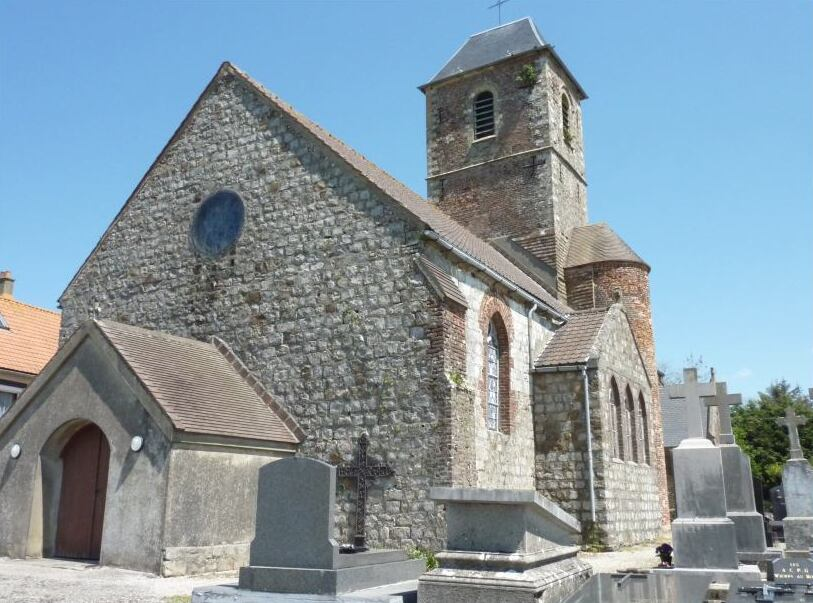
- The church of Wierre-au-Bois

- Coat of arms
- Location of Wierre-au-Bois
- Location within France Location within Hauts-de-France
- Coordinates: 50°38′42″N 1°45′47″E
- Country: France
- Region: Hauts-de-France
- Department: Pas-de-Calais
- Arrondissement: Boulogne-sur-Mer
- Canton: Desvres
- Intercommunality: Desvres-Samer

Government
  - Mayor (2020–2026): Bertrand Flahaut
- Area^{1}: 3.83 km^{2} (1.48 sq mi)
- Elevation: 170 m (560 ft)
- Highest elevation: 91 m (299 ft)
- Lowest elevation: 28 m (92 ft)
- Population (2023): 228
  - Density: 59.5/km^{2} (154/sq mi)
- Time zone: UTC+01:00 (CET)
  - Summer (DST): UTC+02:00 (CEST)
- INSEE/Postal code: 62888 /62830
- ^{1} French Land Register data, which excludes lakes, ponds, glaciers > 1 km^{2} (0.386 sq mi or 247 acres) and river estuaries.

Wierre-au-Bois (French pronunciation: [wjɛʁ o bwa]; West Flemish: Wilder) is a commune in the Pas-de-Calais department in the Hauts-de-France region of France.

== Geography ==
Wierre-au-Bois is situated some 8 miles (13 km) southeast of Boulogne, on the D215 just to the east of Samer.

== Population ==
Historical population
Year	Pop.	±% p.a.
1968	217	—
1975	195	−1.52%
1982	193	−0.15%
1990	203	+0.63%
1999	242	+1.97%
2007	211	−1.70%
2012	224	+1.20%
2017	226	+0.18%
2023	228	+0.15%
Source: INSEE

== Places of interest ==
- The church of St.Omer, dating from the fifteenth century.
- A seventeenth-century chateau.
- A medieval castle.

== See also ==
- Communes of the Pas-de-Calais department
