= Vieil-Moutier =

- Commune
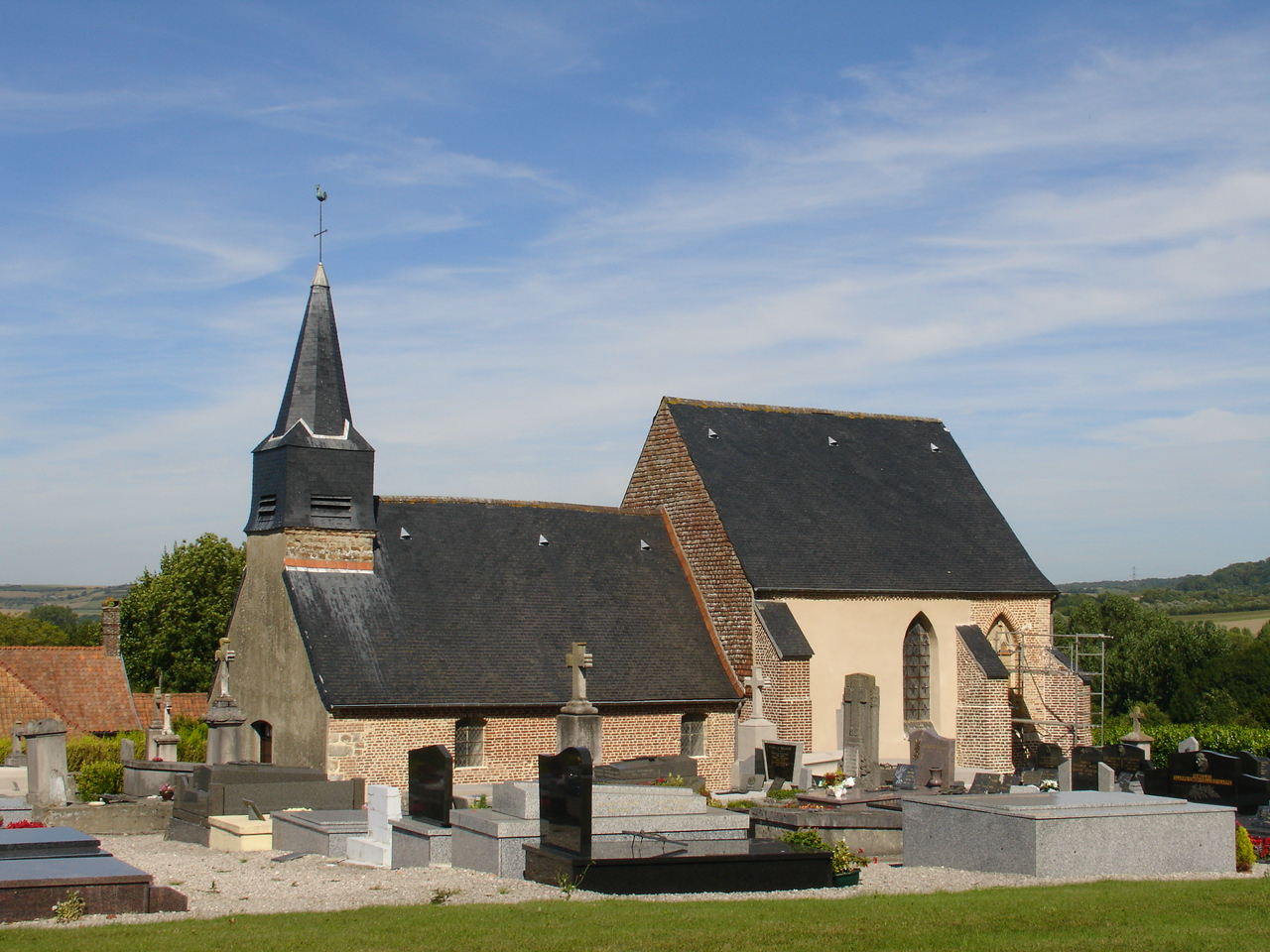
- The church of Vieil-Moutier

- Coat of arms
- Location of Vieil-Moutier
- Location within France Location within Hauts-de-France
- Coordinates: 50°40′28″N 1°54′51″E
- Country: France
- Region: Hauts-de-France
- Department: Pas-de-Calais
- Arrondissement: Boulogne-sur-Mer
- Canton: Desvres
- Intercommunality: CC Desvres-Samer

Government
  - Mayor (2020–2026): Joël Coquet
- Area^{1}: 5.77 km^{2} (2.23 sq mi)
- Elevation: 136 m (446 ft)
- Highest elevation: 204 m (669 ft)
- Lowest elevation: 85 m (279 ft)
- Population (2023): 391
  - Density: 67.8/km^{2} (176/sq mi)
- Time zone: UTC+01:00 (CET)
  - Summer (DST): UTC+02:00 (CEST)
- INSEE/Postal code: 62853 /62240
- ^{1} French Land Register data, which excludes lakes, ponds, glaciers > 1 km^{2} (0.386 sq mi or 247 acres) and river estuaries.

Vieil-Moutier is a commune in the Pas-de-Calais department in the Hauts-de-France region of France.

== Geography ==
Vieil-Moutier is situated some 14 miles (23 km) east of Boulogne, at the junction of the D204 and D204e roads..

== Population ==
Historical population
Year	Pop.	±% p.a.
1968	269	—
1975	302	+1.67%
1982	315	+0.60%
1990	338	+0.88%
1999	333	−0.17%
2007	386	+1.86%
2012	390	+0.21%
2017	386	−0.21%
2023	391	+0.21%
Source: INSEE

== Places of interest ==
- The church of St.Omer, dating from the seventeenth century.
- An ancient farmhouse.

== See also ==
- Communes of the Pas-de-Calais department
