= Verlincthun =

- Commune
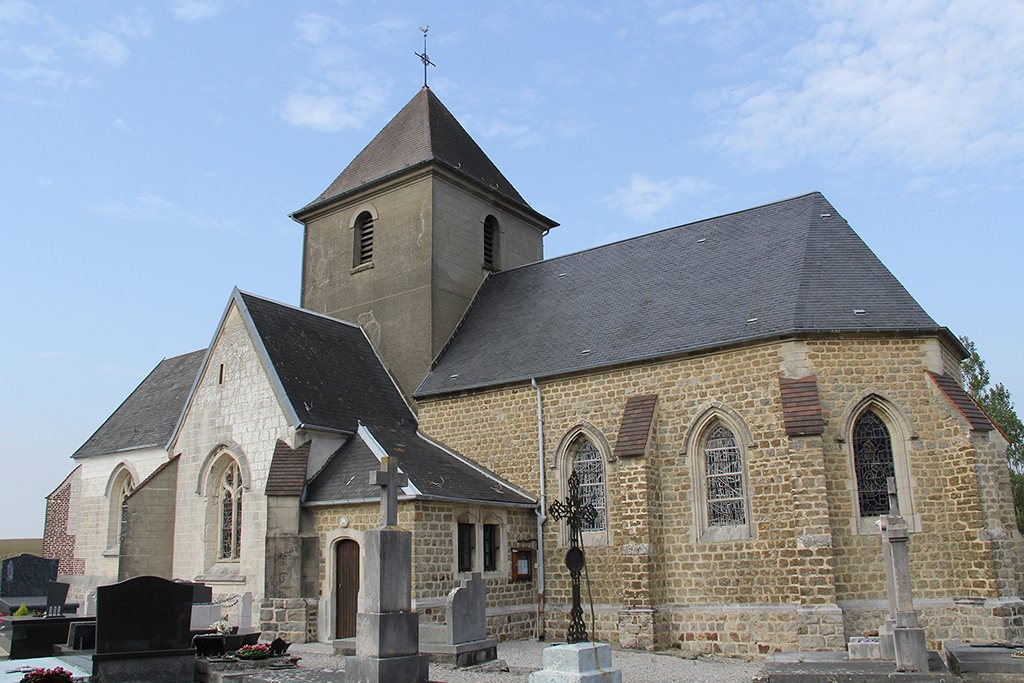
- The church of Verlincthun
- Location of Verlincthun
- Location within France Location within Hauts-de-France
- Coordinates: 50°37′46″N 1°40′46″E
- Country: France
- Region: Hauts-de-France
- Department: Pas-de-Calais
- Arrondissement: Boulogne-sur-Mer
- Canton: Desvres
- Intercommunality: CC Desvres-Samer

Government
  - Mayor (2020–2026): Francis Granderie
- Area^{1}: 7.02 km^{2} (2.71 sq mi)
- Elevation: 64 m (210 ft)
- Highest elevation: 171 m (561 ft)
- Lowest elevation: 24 m (79 ft)
- Population (2023): 516
  - Density: 73.5/km^{2} (190/sq mi)
- Time zone: UTC+01:00 (CET)
  - Summer (DST): UTC+02:00 (CEST)
- INSEE/Postal code: 62845 /62830
- ^{1} French Land Register data, which excludes lakes, ponds, glaciers > 1 km^{2} (0.386 sq mi or 247 acres) and river estuaries.

Verlincthun (French pronunciation: [vɛʁlɛ̃ktœ̃]) is a commune in the Pas-de-Calais department in the Hauts-de-France region of France.

== Geography ==
Verlincthun is situated some 9 miles (14 km) southeast of Boulogne, at the junction of the D215 and D239 roads..

== Population ==
Historical population
Year	Pop.	±% p.a.
1968	278	—
1975	245	−1.79%
1982	263	+1.02%
1990	298	+1.57%
1999	311	+0.48%
2007	366	+2.06%
2012	392	+1.38%
2017	444	+2.52%
2023	516	+2.54%
Source: INSEE

== Places of interest ==
- The church of St.Wulmer, dating from the sixteenth century.
- Traces of a feudal castle.

== See also ==
- Communes of the Pas-de-Calais department
