= Lacres =

- Commune
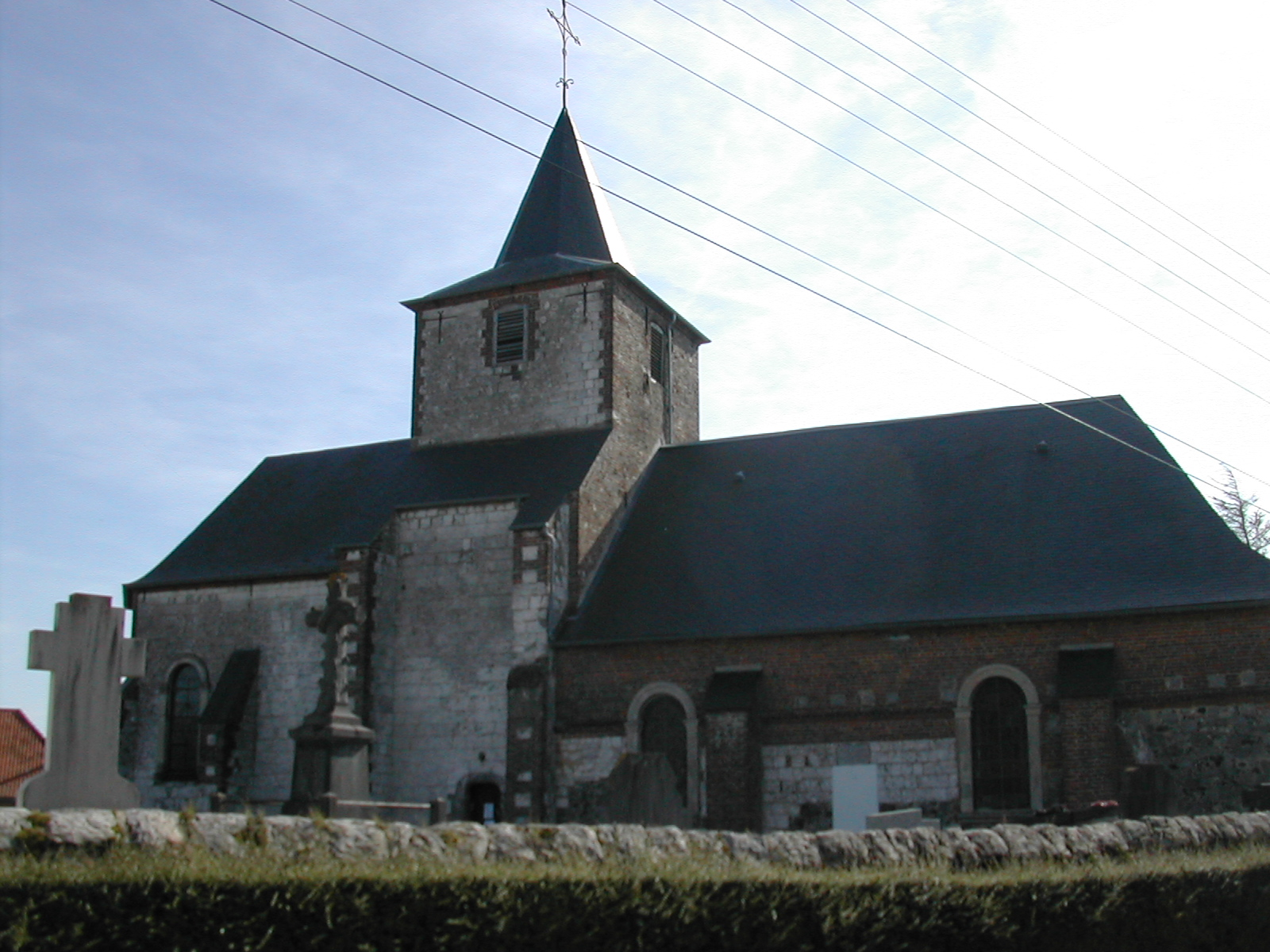
- The church of Lacres

- Coat of arms
- Location of Lacres
- Location within France Location within Hauts-de-France
- Coordinates: 50°35′43″N 1°45′07″E
- Country: France
- Region: Hauts-de-France
- Department: Pas-de-Calais
- Arrondissement: Boulogne-sur-Mer
- Canton: Desvres
- Intercommunality: CC Desvres-Samer

Government
  - Mayor (2024–2026): Jean-François Sagot
- Area^{1}: 8.23 km^{2} (3.18 sq mi)
- Elevation: 100 m (330 ft)
- Highest elevation: 193 m (633 ft)
- Lowest elevation: 75 m (246 ft)
- Population (2023): 250
  - Density: 30/km^{2} (79/sq mi)
- Time zone: UTC+01:00 (CET)
  - Summer (DST): UTC+02:00 (CEST)
- INSEE/Postal code: 62483 /62830
- ^{1} French Land Register data, which excludes lakes, ponds, glaciers > 1 km^{2} (0.386 sq mi or 247 acres) and river estuaries.

Lacres (French pronunciation: [lakʁ]) is a commune in the Pas-de-Calais department in the Hauts-de-France region of France.

== Geography ==
Lacres is situated about 12 miles (19 km) south east of Boulogne, at the junction of the D901 (formerly the N1 Paris-Calais highway) with the D125 and D125e roads.

== Population ==
Historical population
Year	Pop.	±% p.a.
1968	211	—
1975	194	−1.19%
1982	193	−0.07%
1990	190	−0.20%
1999	161	−1.82%
2007	218	+3.86%
2012	246	+2.45%
2017	247	+0.08%
2023	250	+0.20%
Source: INSEE

== Places of interest ==
- The church of St. Martin, dating from the fifteenth century.
- A seventeenth century manorhouse and farmhouse.

== See also ==
- Communes of the Pas-de-Calais department
