= Halinghen =

- Commune
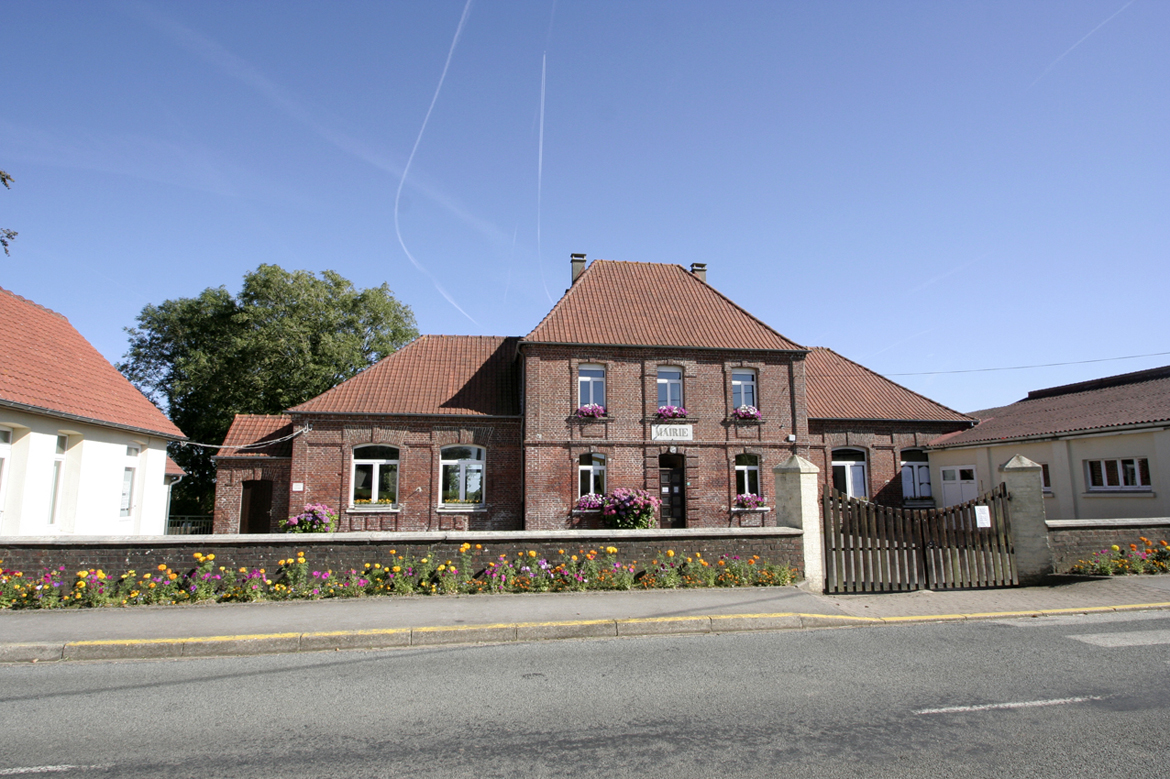
- The town hall of Halinghen

- Coat of arms
- Location of Halinghen
- Location within France Location within Hauts-de-France
- Coordinates: 50°36′11″N 1°41′34″E
- Country: France
- Region: Hauts-de-France
- Department: Pas-de-Calais
- Arrondissement: Boulogne-sur-Mer
- Canton: Desvres
- Intercommunality: CC Desvres-Samer

Government
  - Mayor (2020–2026): Guy Lambert
- Area^{1}: 5.53 km^{2} (2.14 sq mi)
- Elevation: 150 m (490 ft)
- Highest elevation: 178 m (584 ft)
- Lowest elevation: 68 m (223 ft)
- Population (2023): 308
  - Density: 55.7/km^{2} (144/sq mi)
- Time zone: UTC+01:00 (CET)
  - Summer (DST): UTC+02:00 (CEST)
- INSEE/Postal code: 62402 /62830
- ^{1} French Land Register data, which excludes lakes, ponds, glaciers > 1 km^{2} (0.386 sq mi or 247 acres) and river estuaries.

Halinghen (French pronunciation: [alɛ̃ɡɑ̃]) is a commune in the Pas-de-Calais department in the Hauts-de-France region of France about 10 miles (16 km) southeast of Boulogne.

== Population ==
Historical population
Year	Pop.	±% p.a.
1968	248	—
1975	252	+0.23%
1982	249	−0.17%
1990	283	+1.61%
1999	279	−0.16%
2007	287	+0.35%
2012	320	+2.20%
2017	325	+0.31%
2023	308	−0.89%
Source: INSEE

== See also ==
- Communes of the Pas-de-Calais department
