= Desvres =

Desvres Deveren
- Commune
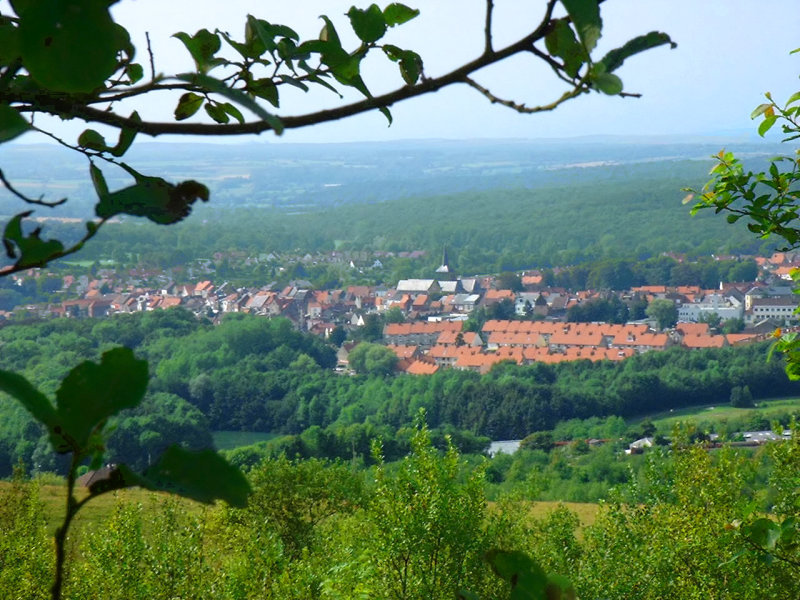
- A general view of Desvres

- Coat of arms
- Location of Desvres
- Location within France Location within Hauts-de-France
- Coordinates: 50°40′07″N 1°50′07″E
- Country: France
- Region: Hauts-de-France
- Department: Pas-de-Calais
- Arrondissement: Boulogne-sur-Mer
- Canton: Desvres
- Intercommunality: CC Desvres-Samer

Government
  - Mayor (2020–2026): Marc Demolliens
- Area^{1}: 9.42 km^{2} (3.64 sq mi)
- Highest elevation: 208 m (682 ft)
- Lowest elevation: 42 m (138 ft)
- Population (2023): 4,829
  - Density: 513/km^{2} (1,330/sq mi)
- Time zone: UTC+01:00 (CET)
  - Summer (DST): UTC+02:00 (CEST)
- INSEE/Postal code: 62268 /62240
- ^{1} French Land Register data, which excludes lakes, ponds, glaciers > 1 km^{2} (0.386 sq mi or 247 acres) and river estuaries.

Desvres (French pronunciation: [dɛvʁ]; Picard: Dèfes; West Flemish: Deveren) is a commune in the Pas-de-Calais department in northern France. It is a market town, known for its pottery. It is the seat of the canton of Desvres.

== Population ==
Historical population
Year	Pop.	±% p.a.
1968	5,789	—
1975	5,828	+0.10%
1982	5,573	−0.64%
1990	5,318	−0.58%
1999	5,205	−0.24%
2007	5,095	−0.27%
2012	5,142	+0.18%
2017	4,985	−0.62%
2023	4,829	−0.53%
Source: INSEE

== See also ==
- Communes of the Pas-de-Calais department
