= Questrecques =

- Commune
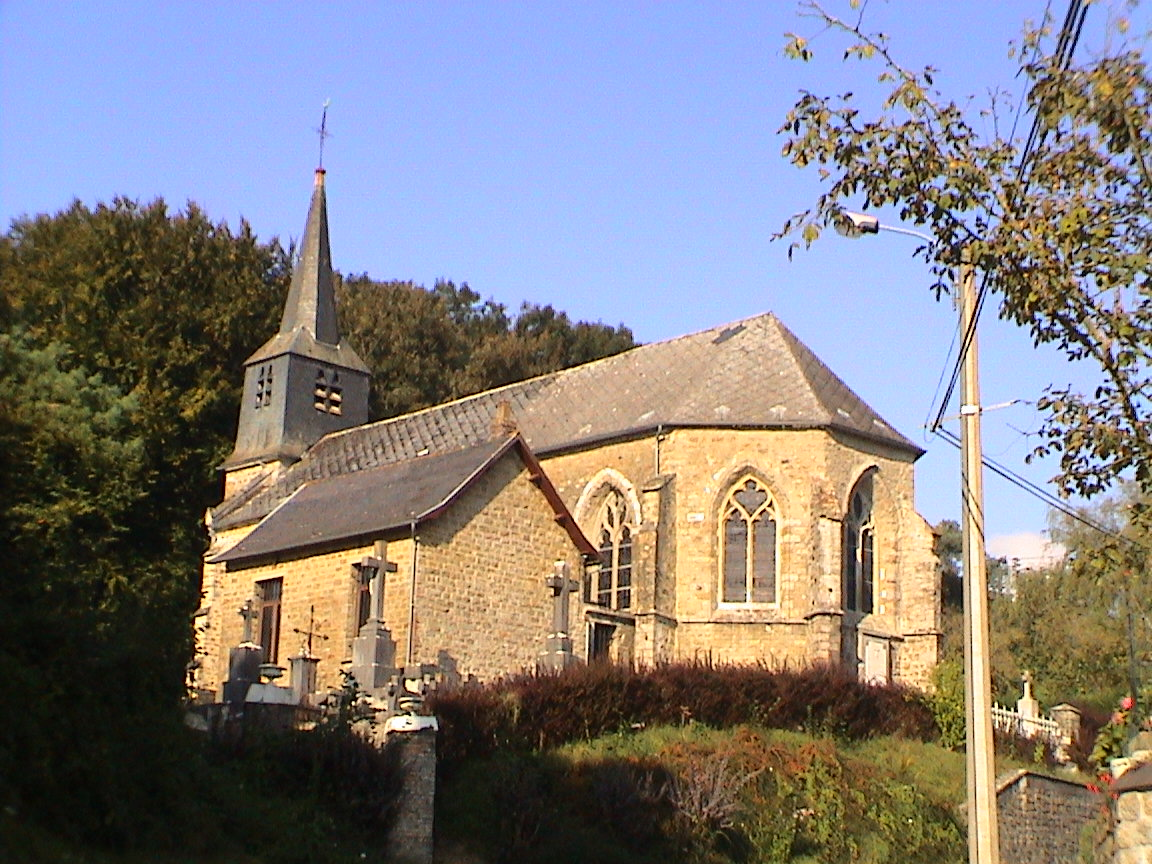
- The church of Questrecques

- Coat of arms
- Location of Questrecques
- Location within France Location within Hauts-de-France
- Coordinates: 50°39′53″N 1°44′55″E
- Country: France
- Region: Hauts-de-France
- Department: Pas-de-Calais
- Arrondissement: Boulogne-sur-Mer
- Canton: Desvres
- Intercommunality: CC Desvres-Samer

Government
  - Mayor (2020–2026): Dominique Paques
- Area^{1}: 5.84 km^{2} (2.25 sq mi)
- Elevation: 45 m (148 ft)
- Highest elevation: 94 m (308 ft)
- Lowest elevation: 16 m (52 ft)
- Population (2023): 333
  - Density: 57.0/km^{2} (148/sq mi)
- Time zone: UTC+01:00 (CET)
  - Summer (DST): UTC+02:00 (CEST)
- INSEE/Postal code: 62679 /62830
- ^{1} French Land Register data, which excludes lakes, ponds, glaciers > 1 km^{2} (0.386 sq mi or 247 acres) and river estuaries.

Questrecques is a commune in the Pas-de-Calais department in the Hauts-de-France region of France 7 miles (11 km) southeast of Boulogne, by the banks of the river Liane.

== Population ==
Historical population
Year	Pop.	±% p.a.
1968	187	—
1975	193	+0.45%
1982	181	−0.91%
1990	258	+4.53%
1999	354	+3.58%
2007	357	+0.11%
2012	336	−1.21%
2017	307	−1.79%
2023	333	+1.36%
Source: INSEE

== See also ==
- Communes of the Pas-de-Calais department
