= Doudeauville, Pas-de-Calais =

Doudeauville
- Commune
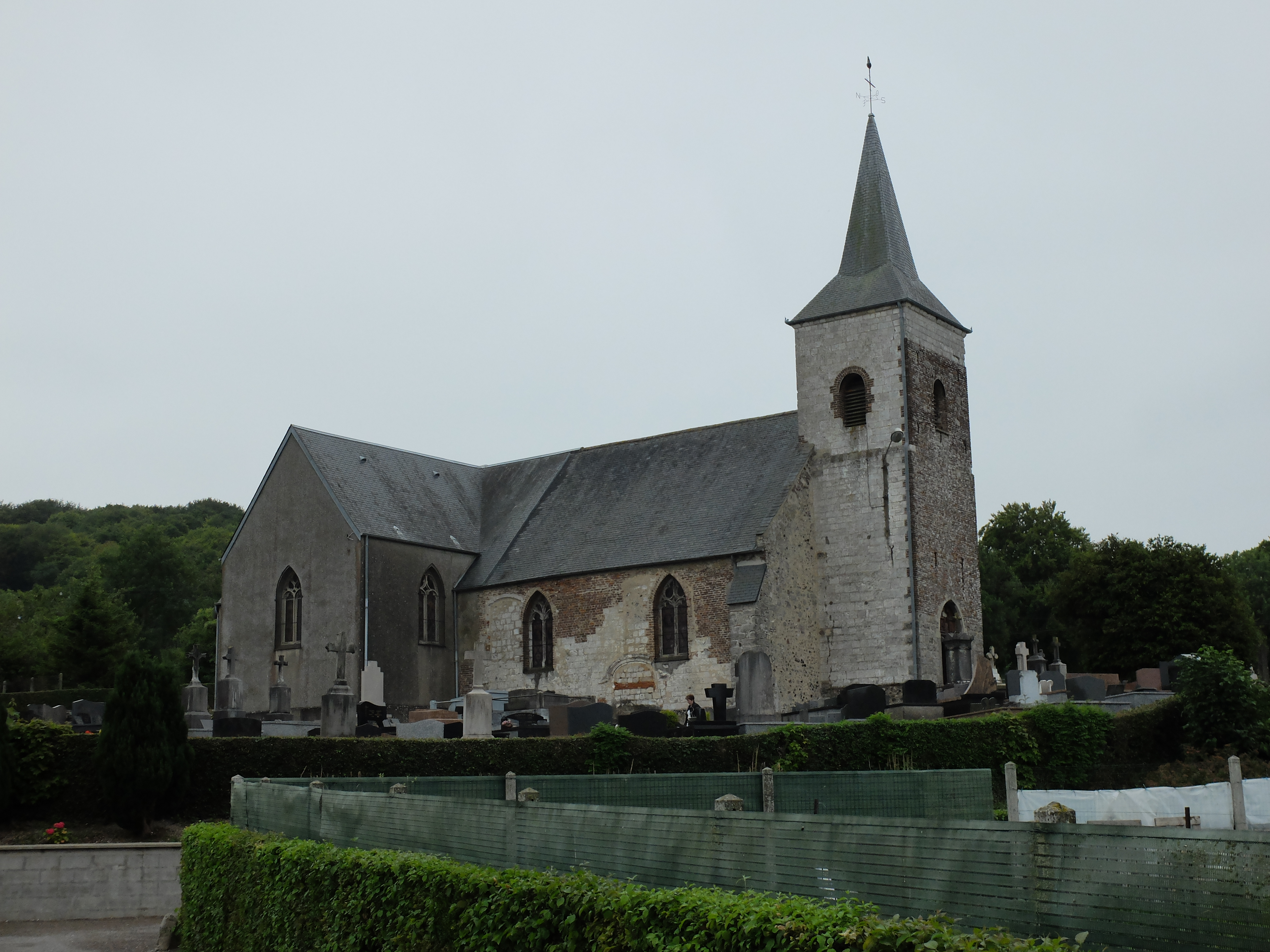
- The church of Doudeauville

- Coat of arms
- Location of Doudeauville
- Location within France Location within Hauts-de-France
- Coordinates: 50°36′45″N 1°49′47″E
- Country: France
- Region: Hauts-de-France
- Department: Pas-de-Calais
- Arrondissement: Boulogne-sur-Mer
- Canton: Desvres
- Intercommunality: CC Desvres-Samer

Government
  - Mayor (2020–2026): Christophe Cousin
- Area^{1}: 13.74 km^{2} (5.31 sq mi)
- Elevation: 85 m (279 ft)
- Highest elevation: 198 m (650 ft)
- Lowest elevation: 80 m (260 ft)
- Population (2023): 593
  - Density: 43.2/km^{2} (112/sq mi)
- Time zone: UTC+01:00 (CET)
  - Summer (DST): UTC+02:00 (CEST)
- INSEE/Postal code: 62273 /62830
- ^{1} French Land Register data, which excludes lakes, ponds, glaciers > 1 km^{2} (0.386 sq mi or 247 acres) and river estuaries.

Doudeauville (French pronunciation: [dudovil]) is a commune in the Pas-de-Calais department in the Hauts-de-France region of France about 13 miles (21 km) southeast of Boulogne.

== Population ==
Historical population
Year	Pop.	±% p.a.
1968	376	—
1975	412	+1.31%
1982	416	+0.14%
1990	383	−1.03%
1999	401	+0.51%
2007	470	+2.00%
2012	511	+1.69%
2017	600	+3.26%
2023	593	−0.20%
Source: INSEE

== See also ==
- Communes of the Pas-de-Calais department
