= Tingry =

- Commune
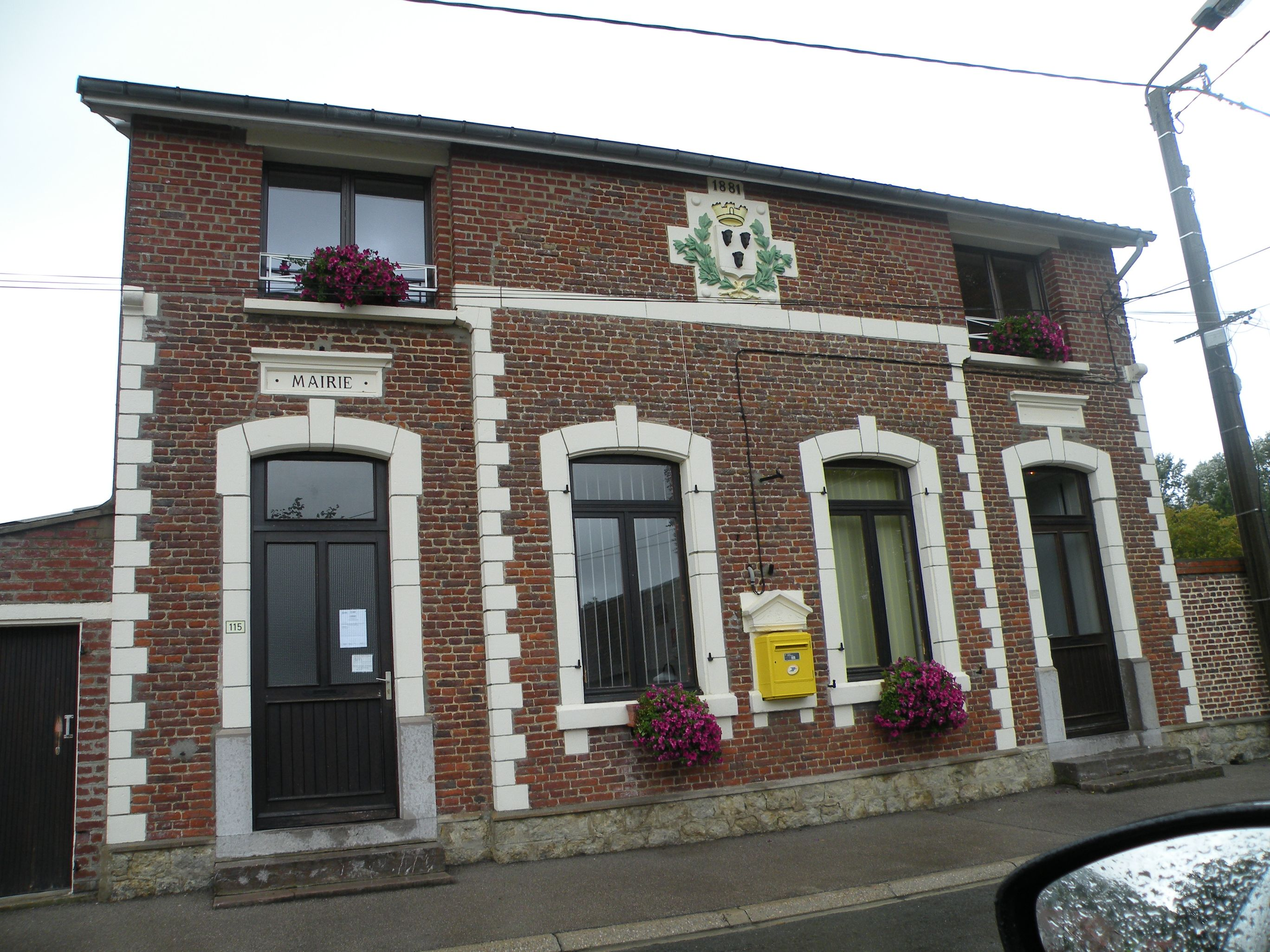
- The town hall of Tingry
- Location of Tingry
- Location within France Location within Hauts-de-France
- Coordinates: 50°37′09″N 1°43′52″E
- Country: France
- Region: Hauts-de-France
- Department: Pas-de-Calais
- Arrondissement: Boulogne-sur-Mer
- Canton: Desvres
- Intercommunality: CC Desvres-Samer

Government
  - Mayor (2020–2026): Didier Paques
- Area^{1}: 11.36 km^{2} (4.39 sq mi)
- Elevation: 71 m (233 ft)
- Highest elevation: 174 m (571 ft)
- Lowest elevation: 29 m (95 ft)
- Population (2023): 291
  - Density: 25.6/km^{2} (66.3/sq mi)
- Time zone: UTC+01:00 (CET)
  - Summer (DST): UTC+02:00 (CEST)
- INSEE/Postal code: 62821 /62830
- ^{1} French Land Register data, which excludes lakes, ponds, glaciers > 1 km^{2} (0.386 sq mi or 247 acres) and river estuaries.

Tingry (French pronunciation: [tɛ̃ɡʁi]) is a commune in the Pas-de-Calais department in the Hauts-de-France region of France about 10 miles (16 km) southeast of Boulogne.

== Population ==
Historical population
Year	Pop.	±% p.a.
1968	258	—
1975	250	−0.45%
1982	272	+1.21%
1990	307	+1.52%
1999	301	−0.22%
2007	315	+0.57%
2012	305	−0.64%
2017	290	−1.00%
2023	291	+0.06%
Source: INSEE

== See also ==
- Communes of the Pas-de-Calais department
