= Samer =

Samer Sint-Wulmaars
- Commune
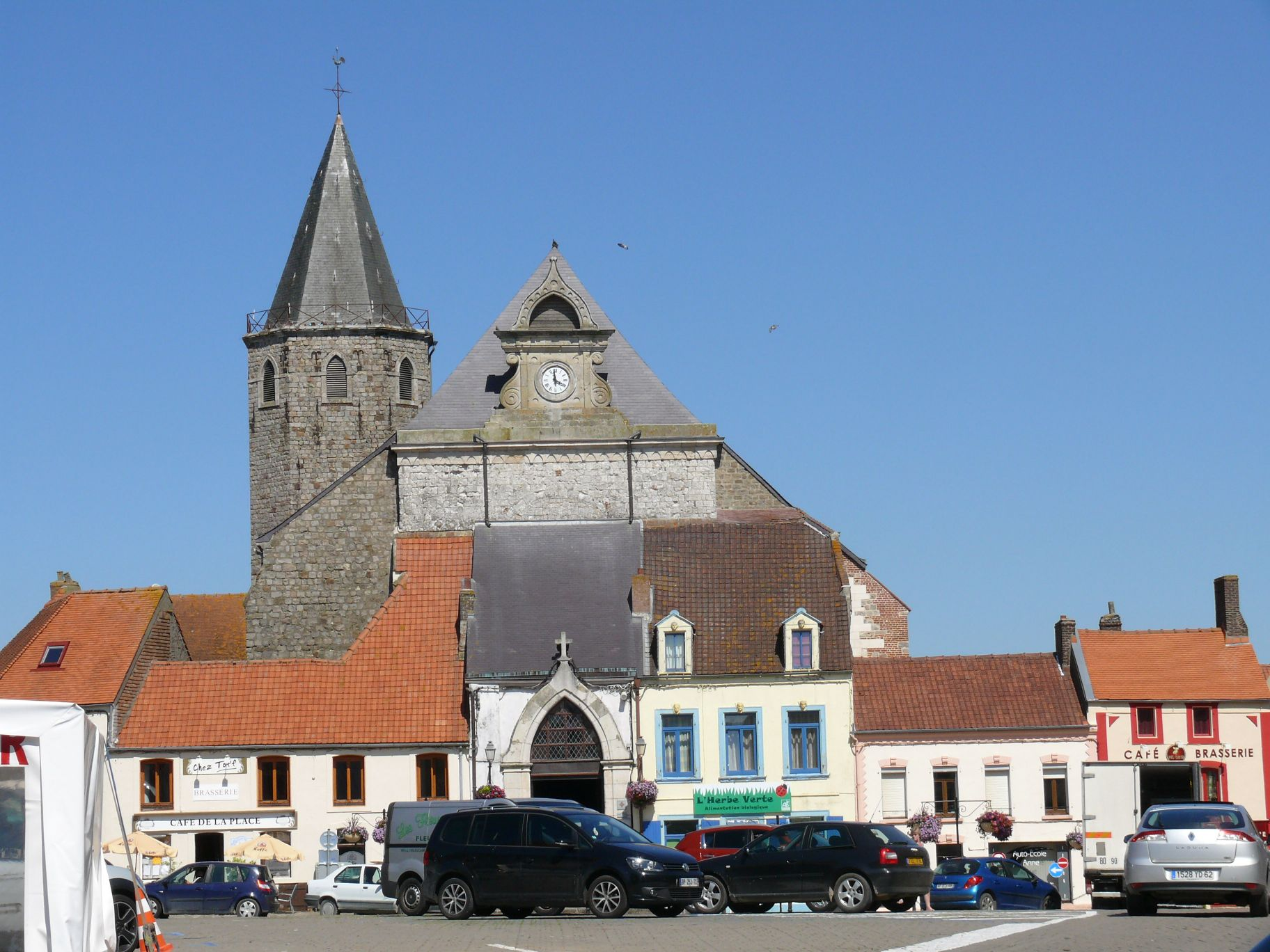
- The church of Samer

- Coat of arms
- Location of Samer
- Location within France Location within Hauts-de-France
- Coordinates: 50°38′20″N 1°44′45″E
- Country: France
- Region: Hauts-de-France
- Department: Pas-de-Calais
- Arrondissement: Boulogne-sur-Mer
- Canton: Desvres
- Intercommunality: CC Desvres-Samer

Government
  - Mayor (2022–2026): Christophe Douchain
- Area^{1}: 16.78 km^{2} (6.48 sq mi)
- Highest elevation: 199 m (653 ft)
- Lowest elevation: 12 m (39 ft)
- Population (2023): 4,704
  - Density: 280.3/km^{2} (726.1/sq mi)
- Time zone: UTC+01:00 (CET)
  - Summer (DST): UTC+02:00 (CEST)
- INSEE/Postal code: 62773 /62830
- ^{1} French Land Register data, which excludes lakes, ponds, glaciers > 1 km^{2} (0.386 sq mi or 247 acres) and river estuaries.

Samer (French pronunciation: [same]; Picard: Samé; West Flemish: Sint-Wulmaars) is a commune in the Pas-de-Calais department in the Hauts-de-France region of France.

== Population ==
Historical population
| Year | Pop. | ±% p.a. |
|---|---|---|
| 1968 | 2,675 | — |
| 1975 | 2,845 | +0.88% |
| 1982 | 2,930 | +0.42% |
| 1990 | 3,026 | +0.40% |
| 1999 | 3,105 | +0.29% |
| 2007 | 3,457 | +1.35% |
| 2012 | 3,891 | +2.39% |
| 2017 | 4,496 | +2.93% |
| 2023 | 4,704 | +0.76% |
Source: INSEE

== Notable people ==
- Saint Vulmar, hermit who founded Samer Abbey in the 6th century.
- Eustace the Monk (c. 1170–1217), pirate and mercenary, was a Benedictine monk at Samer Abbey
- Jean Mouton (c. 1459-30 October 1522), a French composer.
- Jean-Charles Cazin (1840-1901), French landscape painter, was born at Samer.

== See also ==
- Communes of the Pas-de-Calais department
