= Léon Bence =

French physician

- Born: 18 January 1929; Licques, Pas-de-Calais, France
- Died: 13 May 1987 (aged 58); Lille, France
- Education: Faculty of Medicine of Tours
- Known for: Biotherapy, music therapy
- Scientific career
- Fields: Medicine
- Institutions: Lumbres, Pas-de-Calais

Léon Bence (18 January 1929 – 13 May 1987) was a French physician.

== Life ==
Léon Bence had peasant origins, and was born in 1929 at Licques, Pas-de-Calais. He died in 1987 in Lille.

== Education ==
After secondary education in Saint-Omer (Pas-de-Calais), Bence joined the Faculty of Medecine of Lille, where his doctoral thesis was approved in 1955.

== Career ==
Bence's character as a man of the soil led him to choose a career as a country doctor. Although he practised for more than 20 years at Lumbres (Pas-de-Calais), he remained a permanent student. He obtained a diploma of agricultural medicine in 1974 at the Faculty of Medecine of Tours, and his work earned him a prize from the Faculty of Medecine of Strasbourg in 1978.

As a member of the Medical Society of Biotherapy he became familiar with the different systems of biotherapy, which corresponded closely with his convictions derived from his personal experience. His discoveries in the field of laser therapy attracted attention at world congresses in Palma (1982), Sofia (1953) and Brasilia (1984).

His final speciality concerned music therapy, for which he collaborated with the composer Max Méreaux to combine global medicine to take account of the whole person and his personality.
