= Chemin de fer de Boulogne à Bonningues =

Railway in Pas-de-Calais, France

Chemin de Fer de Boulogne à Bonningues
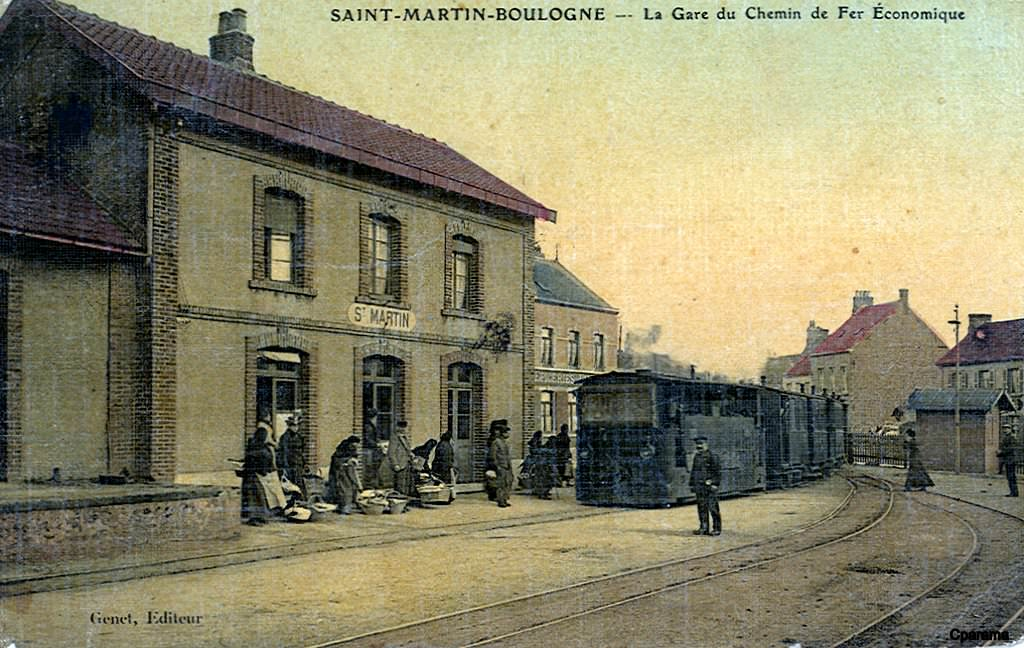
- A train at Saint-Martin-Boulogne station

Overview
- Status: Closed
- Locale: Pas-de-Calais, France
- Termini: Boulogne; Bonningues
- Stations: 26

History
- Opened: 22 April 1900
- Closed: 1948

Technical
- Track length: 43 kilometres (26.72 mi)
- Number of tracks: Single track
- Track gauge: 1,000 mm (3 ft 3 3/8 in) metre gauge
- Minimum radius: 100 metres (330 ft)

The Chemin de Fer de Boulogne à Bonningues (French pronunciation: [ʃəmɛ̃ də fɛʁ də bulɔɲ a bɔnɛ̃ɡ]; CF de BB) was a 1,000 mm (3 ft 3 3/8 in) gauge railway from Boulogne to Bonningues-lès-Ardres, Pas-de-Calais, France, where it had a connection with the Chemin de fer d'Anvin à Calais. It opened in 1900 and closed in 1948.

== Background ==
In France, the building of railways was controlled by the Government. This avoided the duplication of routes that was seen in the United Kingdom and meant that the large cities and towns were connected. The citizens of the smaller towns and villages also wanted railways to be built to connect them to the network. The departments were given authority to oversee the construction of these minor lines, some of which were built to standard gauge and others were built to metre gauge or less.

The Loi Migneret of 12 July 1865 established that railways in France were to be classified as of Intérêt Général or Intérêt Local. The former were deemed to be of sufficient importance that they could be partly charged to the state. The latter were charged to the department.

== History ==
In 1883, a proposal was put forward for a railway from Le Portel to Bonningues-lès-Ardres, in the Pas-de-Calais department. It was decided at an early stage that the line would have to go through Saint-Martin-Boulogne, a village 2.3 kilometres (1.43 mi) from Boulogne which lies at an elevation of 114 metres (374 ft). This presented a problem as a direct line would be too steep for steam trains. Two options were considered, an 8 kilometres (4.97 mi) route from the Gare de Boulogne-Ville northwards via Terlincthun and a 6 kilometres (3.73 mi) route southwards via the Val Saint-Martin. Consideration was given to the line east of Licques running to Tournehem-sur-la-Hem instead of Bonningues-lès-Ardres.

In 1890, permission was given to the Compagnie des Chemins de Fer Économiques du Nord (CEN) to build three metre gauge railways in Pas-de-Calais. Two were to run from Boulogne; one to Le Portel and the other to Bonningues-lès-Ardres. The third line was to run from Frévent to Lens. The two lines from Boulogne were run separately, with the Boulogne–Le Portel line operated as an electric tramway.

The 37-kilometre (22.99 mi) long line between Saint-Martin-Boulogne and Bonningues-lès-Ardres opened on 22 April 1900. In part, it ran through what is now the Parc naturel régional des Caps et Marais d'Opale. In 1901, the Tramways Électriques de Boulogne-sur-Mer (TEB) extended their tram line to Saint-Martin-Boulogne. This was to affect the viability of the section of line between Gare de Boulogne-Ville and Saint-Martin-Boulogne. The CF de BB was extended to the Gare de Boulogne-Ville on 12 May 1902, giving a total length of 43 kilometres (26.72 mi). Boulogne and Bonningues-lès-Ardres are 30 kilometres (18.64 mi) from each other in a direct line. By November 1902, the CF de BB was asking the department for permission to reduce the number of trains between Gare de Boulogne-Ville and Saint-Martin-Boulogne. It is likely that the request was granted. In 1909, the CF de BB carried 112,946 passengers.

In 1911, a proposal was made to run a branch line from the Boulevard Daunou to Boulogne's waste incineration plant, on the banks of the Liane. The branch was used to transport waste from the incineration plant to the town dump on Val Saint-Martin.

The CF de BB remained behind Allied lines during World War I. Boulogne was evacuated in 1914 but was later one of the major ports used by the Allies to import materiel. The line saw little use by the military for much of the war. In November 1917, the British Army laid an 85 metres (93 yd) long siding at La Waroquarie to serve a camp at Ostrohove. Following arguments re the provision of safety measures at the siding, from March 1918 a six-wagon train was run each night from Boulogne to La Waroquarie to bring in supplies.

Following the war, the CF de BB was suffering due to a lack of maintenance of its locomotives and stock during wartime, leading to poor timekeeping. Although services had been improved since 1917, when only one train a day ran the whole length of the line, there were still complaints. A 1919 request to reinstate a late train from Licques to Bonningues-lès-Ardres was refused on cost grounds. In the 1920s, extra trains were laid on from Boulogne to the Hippodrome de l'Inquéterie, a horse racing track between Blanc-Pignon and Souverain-Moulin. French bureaucracy required that the CF de BB had to apply for permission to run these extra trains for each and every race meeting. A new locomotive was ordered in 1922 at a cost of ₣108,000. It was in service by 1925. Another locomotive was ordered in 1924. In 1929, permission was given for part of the passenger service to be operated by buses.

On 31 December 1935, the department bought the concession to operate the CF de BB from the CEN. The line was closed completely between Val Saint-Martin and Colembert, and to passengers between Colembert and Bonningues-lès-Ardres. Freight services on the remaining section of the CF de BB were to be worked by the Chemin de fer d'Anvin à Calais (CF AC). The Boulogne end of the line was given to the Boulogne Town Council in January 1936, for an initial three-year period. It was reclassified as an industrial tramway. What locomotives operated in Boulogne after 1935 is not known, but they were not those of the CF de BB. In 1938, the railway between Val Saint-Martin and Colembert was officially declassified. In July 1939, six locomotives, 23 carriages, 32 goods wagons and five lorries were offered for sale by the department. Also offered for sale were the tools and effects from Saint-Martin-Boulogne depôt, and all moveable effects from the stations at Belle-Houllefort, La Capelle and Saint-Martin-Boulogne.

World War II broke out on 3 September 1939. On 7 May 1940, it was reported to the department that all tools and effects from the depôt at Saint-Martin-Boulogne had disappeared apart from the largest items. All six locomotives were in the depôt, but had been stripped of valuable metals such as copper. The wagons had been broken up and all wood removed. Only one lorry remained. The job of compiling a full inventory hampered by the fact that the depôt was occupied by a motorised unit of the French Army. It was reported that what was left was in a severely worn condition only fit for scrap and that there had been much theft and pillaging. Boulogne fell into German hands on 24 May 1940. The Pas-de-Calais department became a zone of special control, administered by the Oberkommando der Wehrmacht in Brussels, Belgium. Along the coast was the "red zone". It was said that French law did not apply in this zone. Under the terms of the armistice, France was to hand over its railways to the Germans undamaged and was to work with the German authorities to restore them to serviceable condition.

In September 1942, the Marine Verpflugungamt (MVA) decreed that the line between Boulogne and Colombert was to be brought back into use. It was reported that the section between the Gare de Boulogne-Ville and Le Portel was being operated by TEB. Boulogne Town Council were also using the line to Val Saint-Martin. Seven sections of railway, totaling 2.43 kilometres (1.51 mi) had been lifted and some sections of track at level crossings had been tarmaced over. About a quarter of the sleepers would have to be replaced. No rolling stock from the CF de BB was available. It would cost ₣2.65 million to return the railway to use. The line reopened in November 1942 with two trains a day available for conscripted workers. The railway ceased to be used for the transport of waste at Boulogne in April 1944, due to its stock being requisitioned by the Germans. The track serving the incineration plant was taken up. In May 1943, the MVA required two trains to run daily between Lumbres and Boulogne. From 7 June, ten trains a day were to run between Lumbres and Saint-Martin-Boulogne with supplies for the Kriegsmarine. These trains were to be operated by the Compagnie Générale des Voies Ferrées d'Intérêt Local (VFIL). Boulogne was bombed by the Allies on 17 September 1944 and liberated on 22 September. The Gare de Boulougne-Ville and all bridges over the Liane had been destroyed, as was the bridge over the Route de Paris. The latter was not rebuilt.

In 1945, the mayors of the communes served by the CF de BB held a meeting, requesting the reopening of the line between Saint-Martin-Boulogne and Colembert. They pointed out that it had already been refurbished and returned to use by the Germans. Although there was support from the Conseil-Général, the line had been damaged between Saint-Martin-Boulogne and Blanc-Pignon. Further inspection revealed that the Germans had only made the line fit for short-term use. It was stated in 1946 that bus services then being provided were adequate. VFIL stated that it was costing ₣9 million per year to run the freight service from Colembert to Bonningues-lès-Ardres. The line closed in 1948.

== Accidents and incidents ==
There were many minor accidents, mostly involving horse-drawn vehicles at level crossings. A few were of a more serious nature.

- In October 1910, locomotive 51 derailed at Bonningues-lès-Ardres. The cause was attributed to the CF de BB locomotives having shallower wheel flanges than the CF AC locomotives.
- On 19 January 1911, a drunk man sleeping across the tracks between Pernes and Souverain-Moulin was run over in the dark by a train. Both feet had to be amputated.
- On 21 January 1911, two horses were startled by a train near Le Wast-Alicthun. One of the carts ended up being crushed by the train when the horse bolted. The three people on board were thrown clear and suffered minor injuries. The subsequent enquiry place the blame on the horses.
- On 22 June 1911, two men attempted to board a train on the move between Saint-Martin-Boulogne and Belle-Houlefort. The first succeeded, but the second slipped and became trapped under carriage 556. The train was stopped and he was taken to hospital by a passing doctor and later had his right foot amputated. The company decided not to take any further action against him. It is not known whether the fact that the victim was the son of the Mayor of Boulogne had a bearing on the decision.
- In September and October 1912, locomotive 47 derailed three times at or near Tournehem-sur-la-Hem. A meeting between the CF AC and CF de BB failed to find a definite cause for one of the derailments, but it was thought that there was too much weight on the locomotive's centre axle. The locomotives short (1.80 metres (5 ft 11 in)) wheelbase may also have been a factor. Adjustments were made to the springing to put more weight on the first and third axle. The cause of the other two derailments were attributed to the track being wide of gauge, at 1,030 millimetres (3 ft 5 in).
- On 22 June 1924, a passenger train hauled by locomotive 48, comprising five second-class and one first-class carriage, was derailed between Le Wast-Alicthun and Belle-Houllefort. Carriage 567 ended up on the N42. At least one passenger was injured. No explanation was found for the derailment, although it was noted that the locomotive was not fitted with a speedometer.
- On 7 April 1943, a rake of wagons ran away after being detached from a train at La Cappelle. They collided with a train from Belle-Houllefort.

== Description of the line ==
From the Quay Chanzy at Boulogne-Ville, the railway ran in the street, across the Pont de la Lampe over the Liane. One side of this bridge had to be strengthened to take the weight of the trains, trams of the Tramways Électrique du Boulogne ran on the other side, which did not need to be strengthened. The railway then ran along the Rue Pierre Daunou, under the Boulogne–Calais railway and along the Rue de Brecquerecque to La Madeleine Halte. Leaving the road, the railway began a climb to Saint-Martin-Boulogne, crossing the Route de Paris by means of an overbridge with a span of 7.35 metres (24 ft 1 in) and a clearance of 12.00 metres (39 ft 4 in) over the road. The line continued around the Val Saint-Martin through Ostrohove and La Waroquerie to Saint-Martin-Boulogne, at an elevation of 114.4 metres (375 ft). Saint-Martin-Boulogne was the headquarters of the CF de BB, with a locomotive depôt and carriage sheds located near the station. The line then descended through Blanc-Pignon to Le Wast-Alincthun (52 metres (171 ft)) before climbing again through Colembert to a summit at 136 metres (446 ft) between Longueville and Surques. The line descended to Licques (67 metres (220 ft) before climbing to Bonningues-lès Ardres, where there was a junction with the Chemin de fer d'Anvin à Calais.

Rails were Vignole rails, 21 kilograms per metre (42 lb/yd) except between Boulogne and La Madelaine, where tramway rails of 45 kilograms per metre (91 lb/yd) were used. Minimum curve radius was 100 metres (330 ft). Maximum gradient was 30mm/m for 460 metres (500 yd) near Ostrohove. The next steepest gradient was 22mm/m for 3.5 kilometres (2.17 mi) between Le Wast-Alicthun and Colembert. Apart from the bridge over the Route de Paris, the only other significant bridge was that over the Hem near Audenfort.

== Stations ==
Station had a two-storey building, some of which had a single storey wing that handled freight traffic. Halts had a single storey building. Arrêts may have been provided with shelters, although some had no facilities. For further details of stations marked (CF AC), refer to the article on that system.

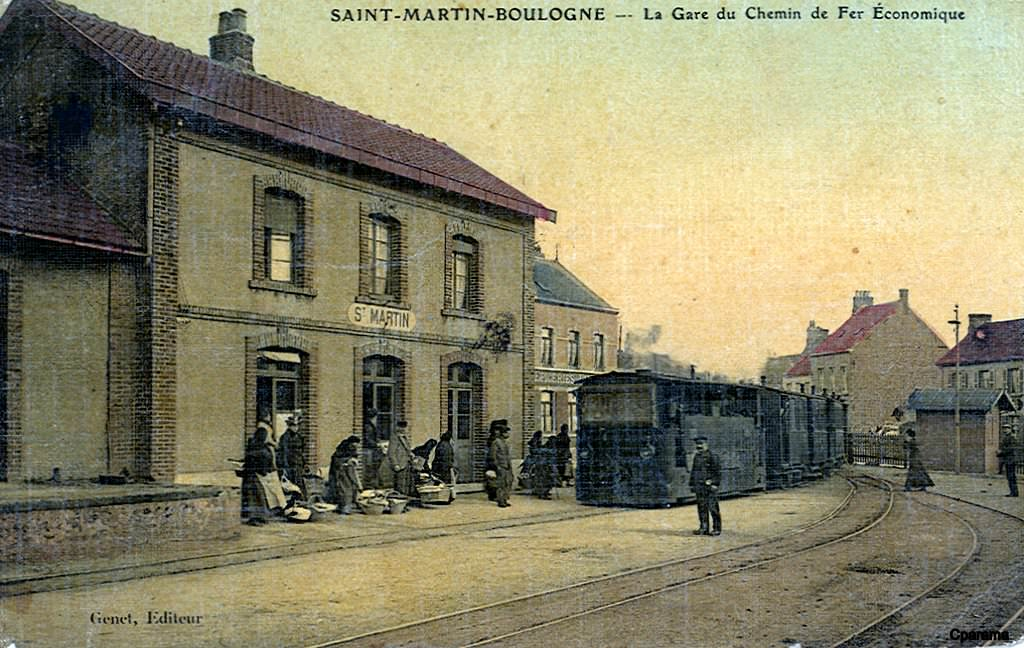
Saint-Martin-Boulogne

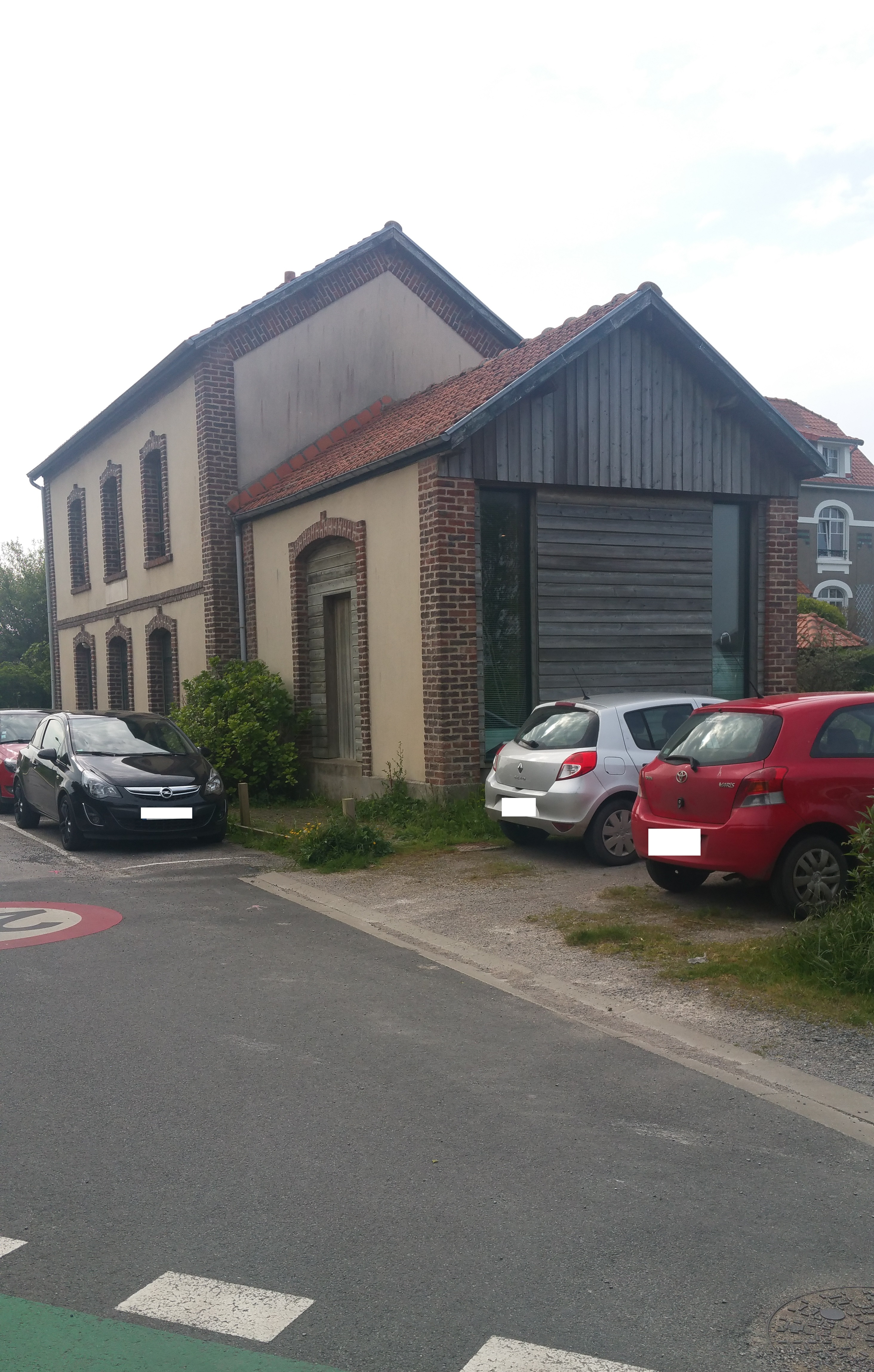
La Cappelle

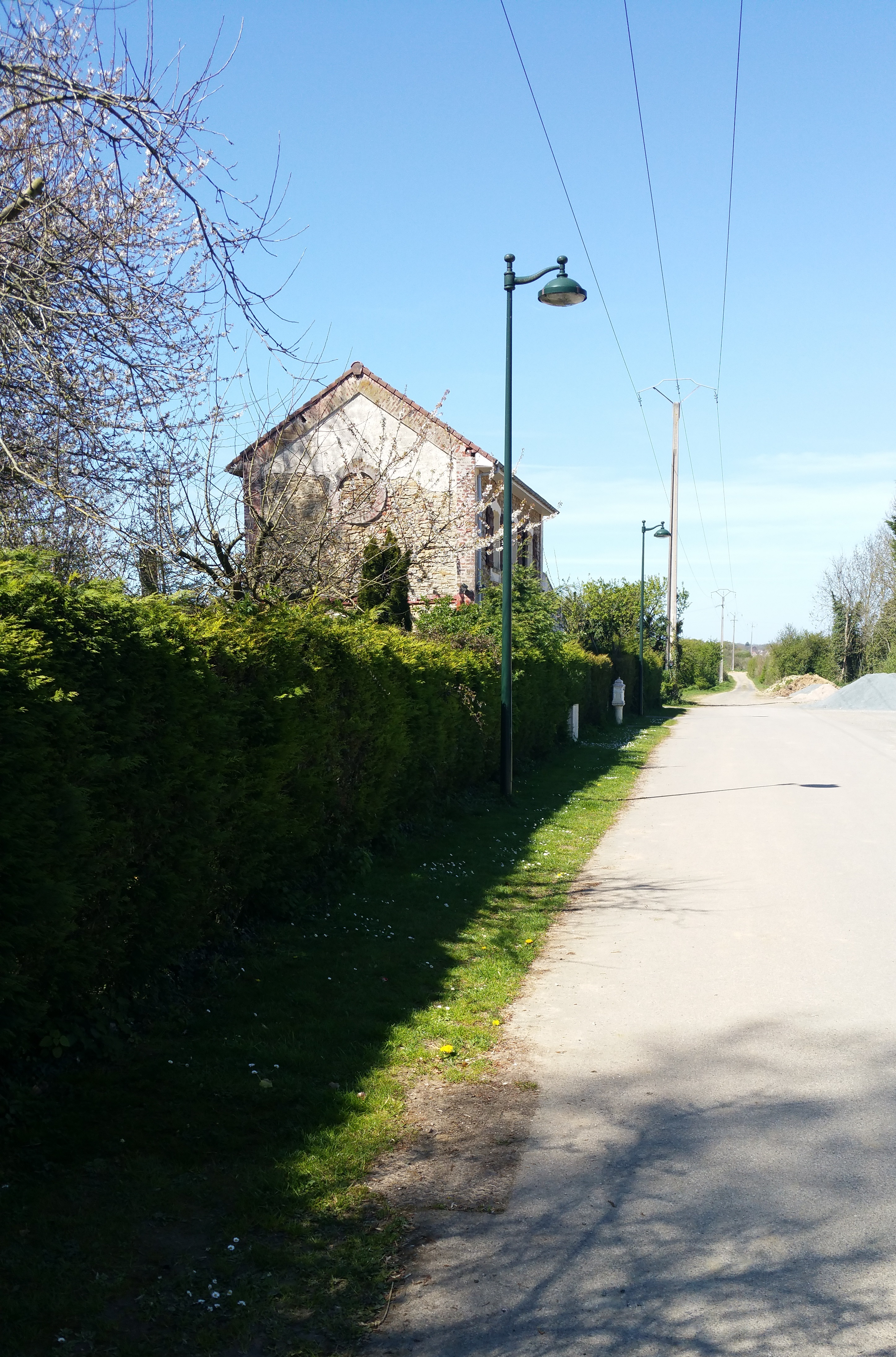
Belle-et-Houllefort

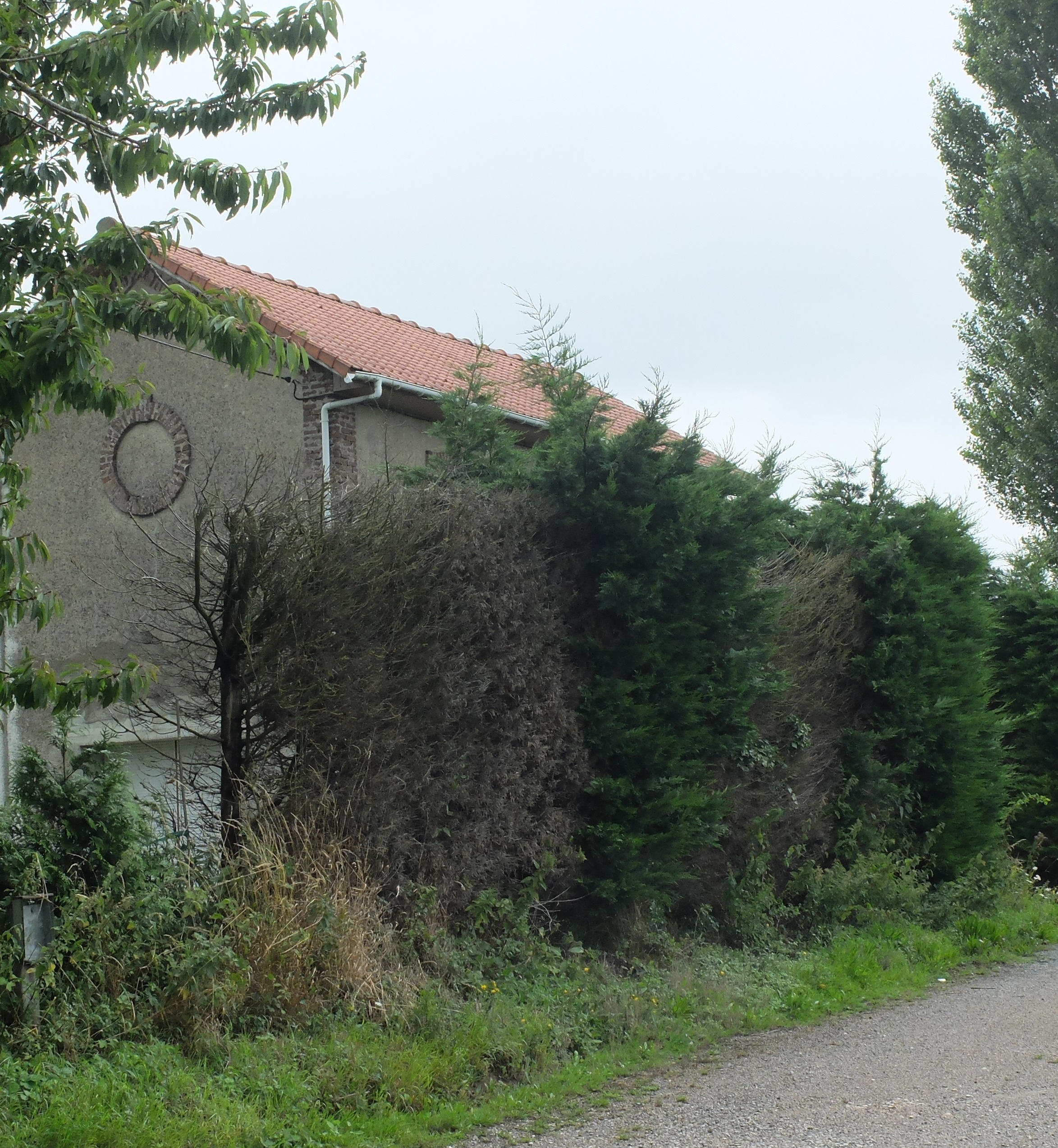
Le Wast-Alincthun

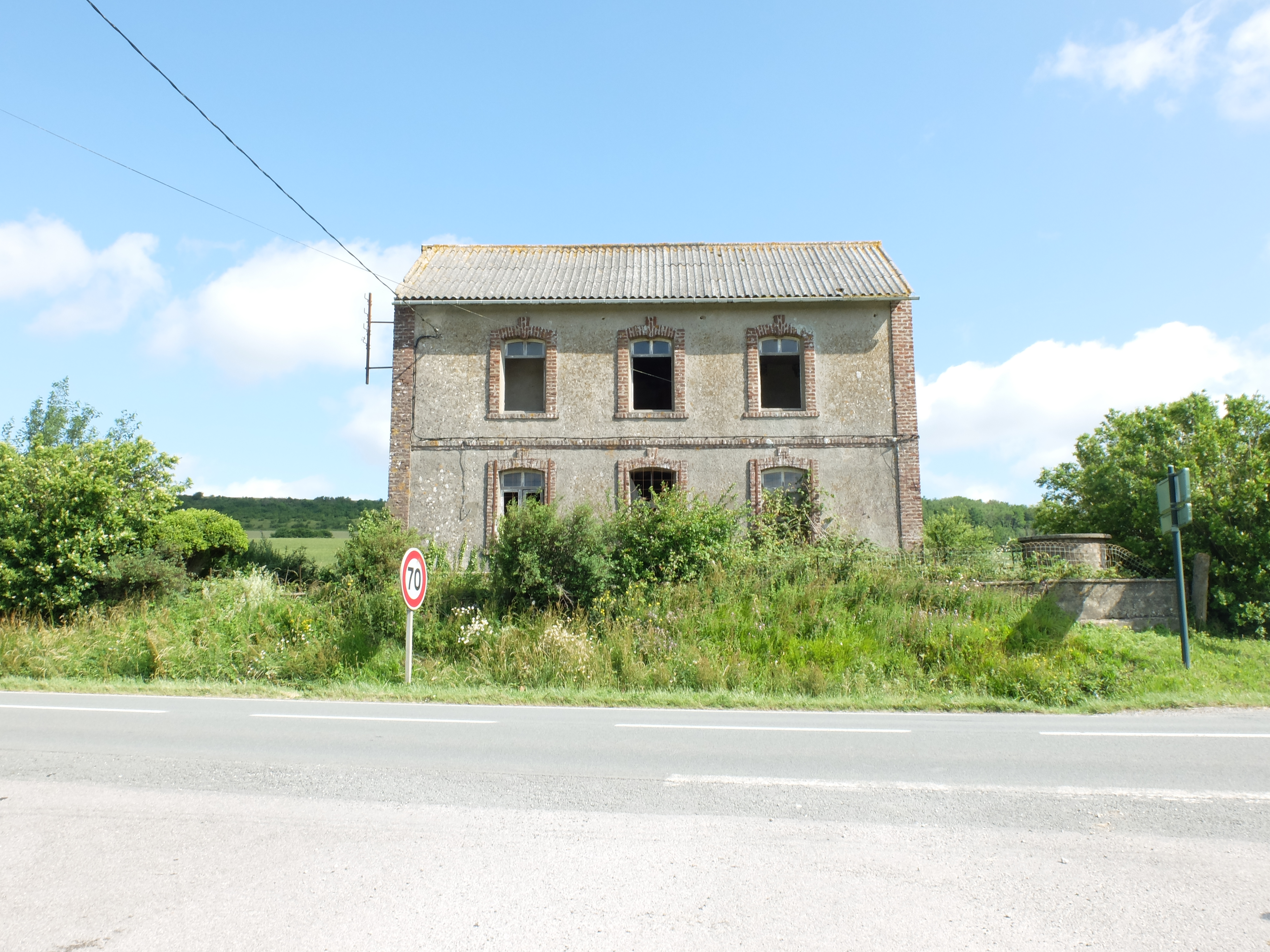
Longueville

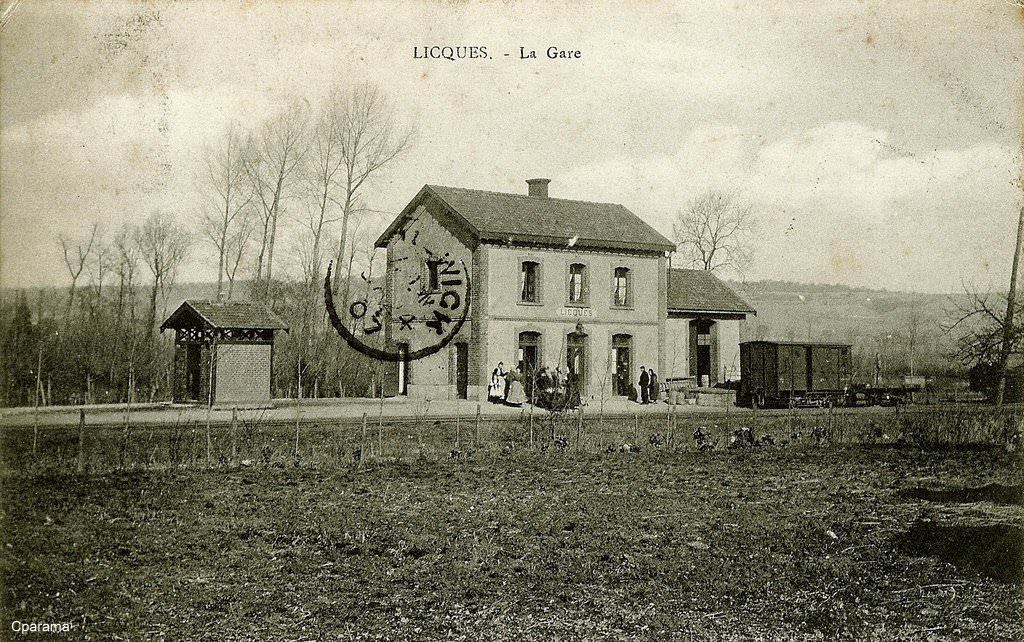
Licques
- Boulogne - 0 kilometres (0 mi) point. The CF BB started alongside the Gare de Boulogne-Ville on the Quai Chanzy. Elevation 6 metres (20 ft).
- Rue de la Lampe - 0.5 kilometres (550 yd) from Boulogne. An arrêt. Elevation 6 metres (20 ft). Closed shortly after opening.
- Rue de la Liane - An arrêt. Elevation 6 metres (20 ft). Closed shortly after opening.
- Abbatoir - 1.3 kilometres (1,400 yd) from Boulogne. An arrêt. Elevation 13 metres (43 ft).
- La Madelaine - 1.8 kilometres (1.12 mi) from Boulogne. A halt. Elevation 20 metres (66 ft).
- Ostrohove - 2.8 kilometres (1.7 mi) from Boulogne. An arrêt, upgraded to halt status by 1935. Elevation 44 metres (144 ft)).
- La Waroquerie - 3.7 kilometres (2.30 mi) from Boulogne. An arrêt. Elevation 69 metres (226.38 ft).
- Saint-Martin-Boulogne - 6.1 kilometres (3.79 mi) from Boulogne. A station, and the main station on the line. Elevation 114.4 metres (375 ft).
- Blanc-Pignon - 8.2 kilometres (5.10 mi) from Boulogne. An arrêt. Elevation 97 metres (318 ft).
- Souverain-Moulin - 10.5 kilometres (6.52 mi) from Boulogne. An arrêt. Elevation 102 metres (335 ft).
- Pernes - 11.4 kilometres (7.08 mi) from Boulogne. A halt. Elevation 106 metres (348 ft).
- La Cappelle - 12.6 kilometres (7.83 mi) from Boulogne. A station. Elevation 103 metres (338 ft).
- La Fôret - 13.4 kilometres (8.33 mi) from Boulogne. An arrêt. Elevation 85 metres (279 ft).
- Conteville - 14.8 kilometres (9.20 mi) from Boulogne. A station. Elevation 57 metres (187 ft).
- Belle-et-Houllefort - 17.7 kilometres (11.00 mi) from Boulogne. A station. Elevation 41 metres (135 ft).
- Le Wast-Alincthun - 20.8 kilometres (12.92 mi) from Boulogne. A station. Elevation 52 metres (171 ft).
- Le Plouy - 21.8 kilometres (13.55 mi) from Boulogne. An arrêt opened between 1900 and 1937. Elevation 63 metres (207 ft).
- Colembert - 24.3 kilometres (15.10 mi) from Boulogne. A station. Elevation 114 metres (374 ft).
- Longueville - 28.0 kilometres (17.40 mi) from Boulogne. A station. Elevation 120 metres (390 ft).
- Escœuilles - An arrêt opened between 1900 and 1937.
- Surques - 31.5 kilometres (19.57 mi) from Boulogne. A station. Elevation 110 metres (360 ft).
- Le Mouflon - 32.5 kilometres (20.19 mi) from Boulogne. An arrêt . Elevation 109 metres (358 ft).
- Bainghen - An arret opened between 1900 and 1937.
- Herbinghen-Hocquinghen - 35.1 kilometres (21.81 mi) from Boulogne. A halt. Elevation 35.1 metres (115 ft).
- Licques - 37.5 kilometres (23.30 mi) from Boulogne. A station. Elevation 67 metres (220 ft).
- Audenfort - 39.8 kilometres (24.73 mi) from Boulogne. A halt. Elevation 55 metres (180 ft).
- Bonningues (CF AC) - 43.1 kilometres (26.78 mi) from Boulogne. A Type 2 station. Elevation 68 metres (223 ft).

== Rolling stock ==
=== Locomotives ===
The CF de BB operated the following steam locomotives.

No.	Builder	Year	Wheel arrangement	Notes
1	Corpet-Louvet		0-6-0T	Ordered in 1922, in service by 1925
23	Piguet	1924	0-6-0T	
47	Blanc-Misseron	1900	0-6-0T	Probably constructed by Tubize, Belgium.
48	Blanc-Misseron	1900	0-6-0T	Probably constructed by Tubize.
49	Blanc-Misseron	1900	0-6-0T	Probably constructed by Tubize.
51	Blanc-Misseron	1900	0-6-0T	Probably constructed by Tubize.

=== Passenger stock ===
For the opening of the line in 1900, 22 four-wheeled carriages were bought. These had end platforms. Three were first class, with seats for six passengers and room for eight more to stand. They also doubled as fourgons (baggage cars). The other nineteen carriages were second class, eighteen seated and fourteen standing. By 1914, a composite carriage had been added to the fleet.

=== Freight stock ===
For the opening of the line in 1900, 52 wagons were bought. These were a mixture of flat wagons, open wagons and vans. Following World War I, 28 further ex-British Army wagons were acquired. When the line closed, 4 flat wagons, 15 open wagons and 13 vans were offered for sale.
