= Bonningues =

Bonningue may refer to:

- Bonningues-lès-Ardres, a commune in the Pas-de-Calais department in the Hauts-de-France region in northern France
- Bonningues-lès-Calais, a commune in the Pas-de-Calais department in the Hauts-de-France region in northern France.
