= Fracas (perfume) =

1948 tuberose perfume by Germaine Cellier for Robert Piguet

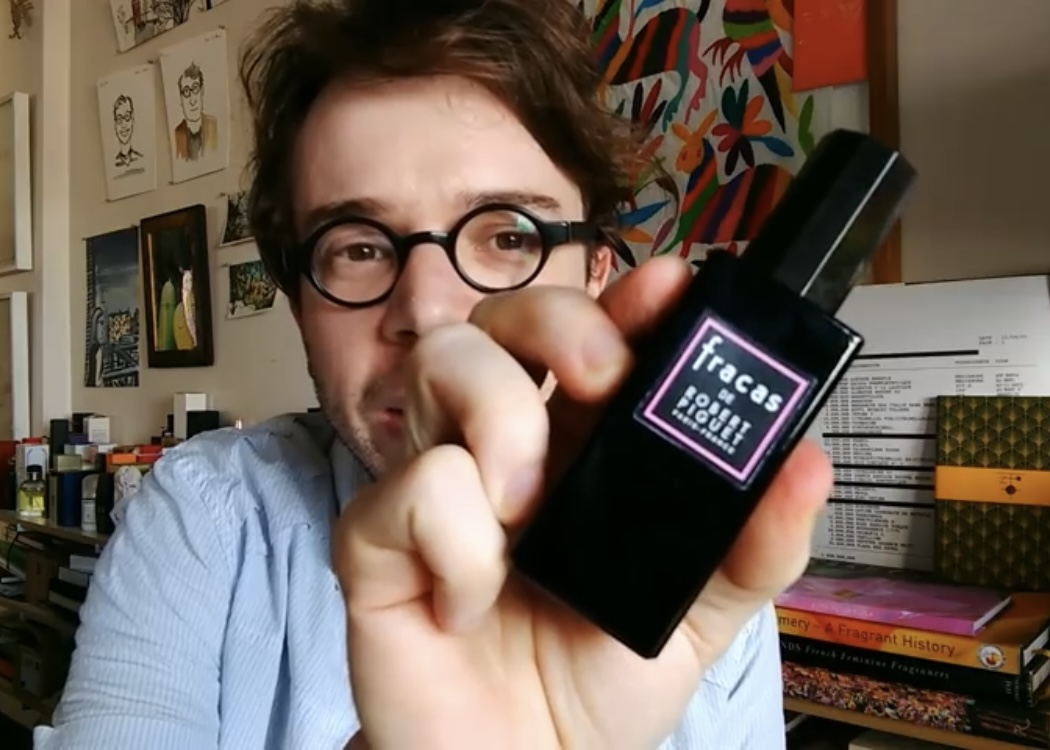
A fragrance vlogger holds up a bottle of Fracas in 2017

Fracas is a 1948 perfume created by French perfumer Germaine Cellier for French fashion designer Robert Piguet. It is based on the scent of tuberose, a pungent small white flower (unrelated to rose). A landmark fragrance, it has spawned many imitators and as of 2024 has been in production for over 75 years.

== Background ==
Cellier, then one of the only women working as a "nose" in formal perfumery, dedicated it to actress Edwige Feuillère, who had been the object of scandal when she appeared nude in the 1935 film Lucrezia Borgia.

== Fragrance notes ==
The fragrance is known as a tuberose powerhouse, but other ingredients amplify the effect. Reviewing the fragrance for The New York Times, Chandler Burr detailed its notes:

"Cellier packed her formula with Indian tuberose absolute, which gives it huge power and 'sillage' (the olfactory trail)....To achieve an even more lifelike, more raw tuberose (this flower smells of armpit, flesh and decay due to heavy molecules called indoles; jasmine is similarly loaded with them), she used an even larger quantity of Tunisian orange blossom absolute, plus some astronomically expensive French jasmine and Italian iris root butter. Add natural violet leaf to give the sweet, heavy scent a refreshingly harsh, wet green aspect, iris for a woody depth, synthetic civet (the smell of unwashed construction worker) for power, the synthetics C18 for an unctuous, milky, soft tropical quality and methyl anthranilate for fizz."

Since inception, it has been reformulated and as of 2008 perfumer Aurélien Guichard was responsible for the newer versions.

== Reception ==
Fracas's fans include Courtney Love, who said of the fragrance, "No one can ignore you when you're wearing it, yet it's not annoying. It smells to me like a baby's head, a field of dreamy white meadow flowers, and a touch of sex." Chandler Burr gave Fracas five stars and called it "transcendent", saying it has "a signature, a persistence on skin, and a diffusion that are – all three – astonishing. [A] hat trick." In Perfumes: The A-Z Guide, Luca Turin gave Fracas five stars, signaling "masterpiece". Writing in the first part of the 21st century, he noted that recent reformulations had brought the scent closer to Cellier's original, as compared with "threadbare" versions sold in the 1980s.

== Influence ==
Perfume line founder Frédéric Malle of Éditions de Parfums Frédéric Malle has said, "Every single person making a tuberose fragrance is trying to knock off the classic, which is Fracas." His line's contribution to the genre is Carnal Flower. Madonna's celebrity scent Truth or Dare is also based on Fracas, which the singer's mother wore.
