= Surques =

Surques Zurke
- Commune
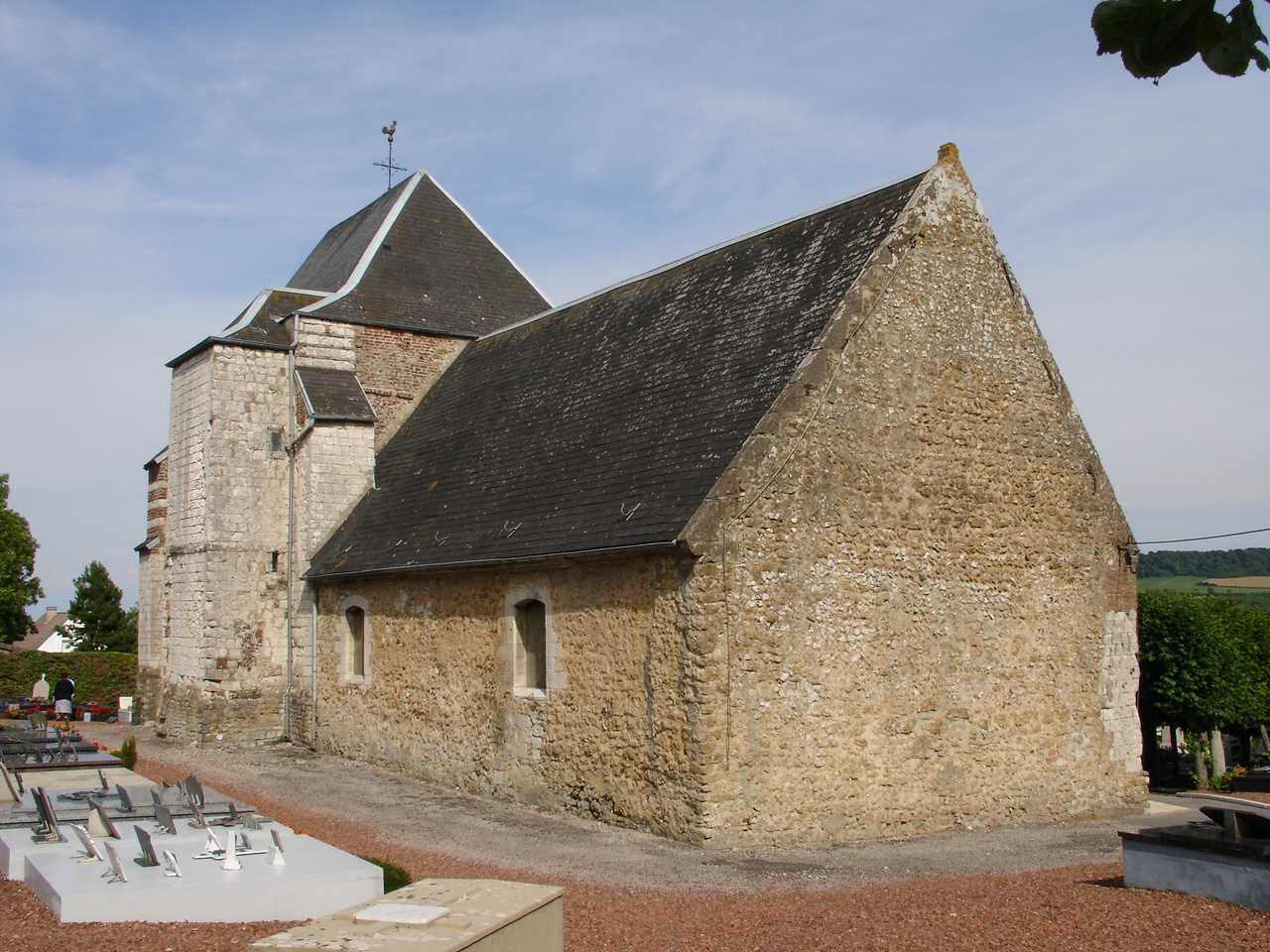
- The church of Surques

- Coat of arms
- Location of Surques
- Location within France Location within Hauts-de-France
- Coordinates: 50°44′27″N 1°55′01″E
- Country: France
- Region: Hauts-de-France
- Department: Pas-de-Calais
- Arrondissement: Saint-Omer
- Canton: Lumbres
- Intercommunality: Pays de Lumbres

Government
  - Mayor (2020–2026): Marie-Hélène Taverne
- Area^{1}: 6.85 km^{2} (2.64 sq mi)
- Elevation: 144 m (472 ft)
- Highest elevation: 199 m (653 ft)
- Lowest elevation: 69 m (226 ft)
- Population (2023): 624
  - Density: 91.1/km^{2} (236/sq mi)
- Time zone: UTC+01:00 (CET)
  - Summer (DST): UTC+02:00 (CEST)
- INSEE/Postal code: 62803 /62850
- ^{1} French Land Register data, which excludes lakes, ponds, glaciers > 1 km^{2} (0.386 sq mi or 247 acres) and river estuaries.

Surques (French pronunciation: [syʁk]; West Flemish: Zurke) is a commune in the Pas-de-Calais department in the Hauts-de-France region of France about 15 miles (24 km) west of Saint-Omer, in the valley of the Hem river.

== Population ==
Historical population
Year	Pop.	±% p.a.
1968	327	—
1975	357	+1.26%
1982	345	−0.49%
1990	364	+0.67%
1999	365	+0.03%
2007	463	+3.02%
2012	577	+4.50%
2017	640	+2.09%
2023	624	−0.42%
Source: INSEE

== Transport ==
The Chemin de fer de Boulogne à Bonningues (CF de BB) opened a station at Surques on 22 April 1900. Passenger services were withdrawn on 31 December 1935. They were reinstated in November 1942. The CF de BB closed in 1948.

== See also ==
- Communes of the Pas-de-Calais department
