= Antonio Castillo (costume designer) =

Spanish fashion and costume designer

- Born: Antonio Cánovas del Castillo de Rey; 13 December 1908; Madrid, Spain
- Died: 13 May 1984 (aged 75); Madrid, Spain
- Occupations: Costume designer; fashion designer
- Years active: 1936–1972

Antonio Cánovas del Castillo de Rey (13 December 1908 – 13 May 1984), known professionally as Antonio Castillo, was a Spanish fashion and costume designer. His accolades include an Academy Award, in addition to nominations for a BAFTA Award and a Tony Award.

== Biography ==
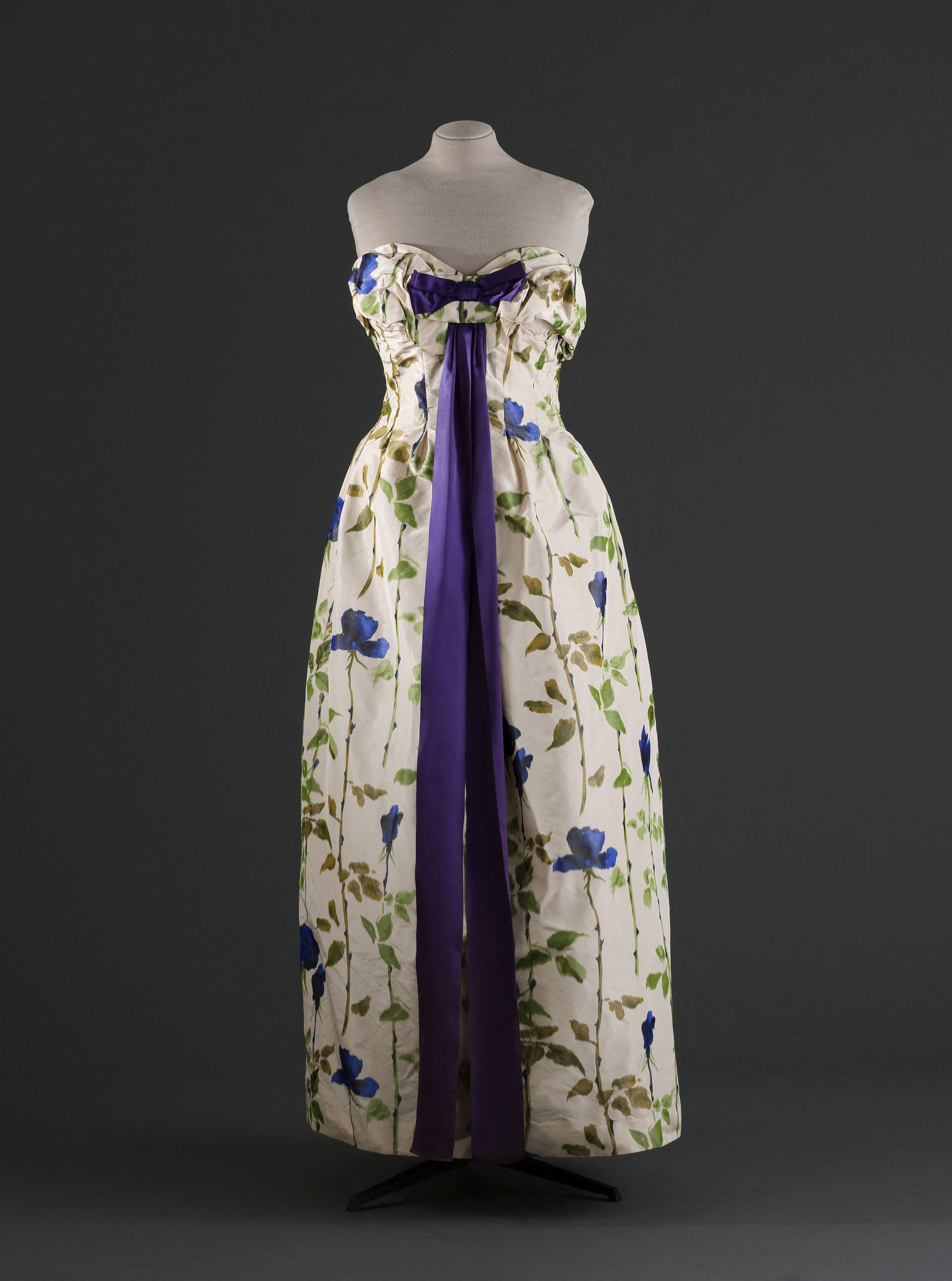
Timbale evening gown, Lanvin-Castillo, Spring-Summer 1957 (Palais Galliera)

Antonio Cánovas del Castillo de Rey was born in 1908 in Madrid. He was educated in his home city at the Colegio del Pilar and the University of Madrid before studying in Granada at the El Sacro Monte.

In 1936 the Spanish Civil War started and Castillo went to Paris. He spent some time as a diplomat until in 1949 he became a designer for Paquin and Robert Piguet. He also designed accessories for Coco Chanel.

Castillo, together with Pierre Balmain, Cristóbal Balenciaga, and Christian Dior, were the new generation of Paris designers after World War 2. In 1945, Elizabeth Arden persuaded him to join her in New York. He produced collections based on natural shoulder lines and slim silhouettes, topped with small hats, until 1950. Castillo also worked as a costume designer for the New York Metropolitan Opera Company and for Broadway shows.

In 1950, Castillo was invited by Jeanne Lanvin's daughter to design for her mother's firm in Paris, with hopes of reinvigorating the firm's name. In 1950 he joined the fashion house of Lanvin. Lanvin had died in 1946 and the salon needed a new designer. From 1950 to 1962, the salon was known for elegant clothes, slender lines, long flowing skirts in rich fabrics, and elaborate embroideries. In 1962, Castillo left Lanvin and in 1964 opened his own business in Paris. He continued to design clothes for clients, the film and the stage. His assistant at Lanvin for ten years until 1962 was Dominic Toubeix who went to New York and became a Coty Award winning designer there, before returning to Paris in 1974 to present a couture collection in Castillo's name.

== Awards and nominations ==
Academy Awards

Year	Category	Nominated work	Result	Ref.
1971	Best Costume Design	Nicholas and Alexandra	Won	

BAFTA Awards

Year	Category	Nominated work	Result	Ref.
British Academy Film Awards
1971	Best Costume Design	Nicholas and Alexandra	Nominated	

Tony Awards

Year	Category	Nominated work	Result	Ref.
1959	Best Costume Design	Goldilocks	Nominated	

== See also ==
- List of Spanish Academy Award winners and nominees
