= Licques =

- Commune
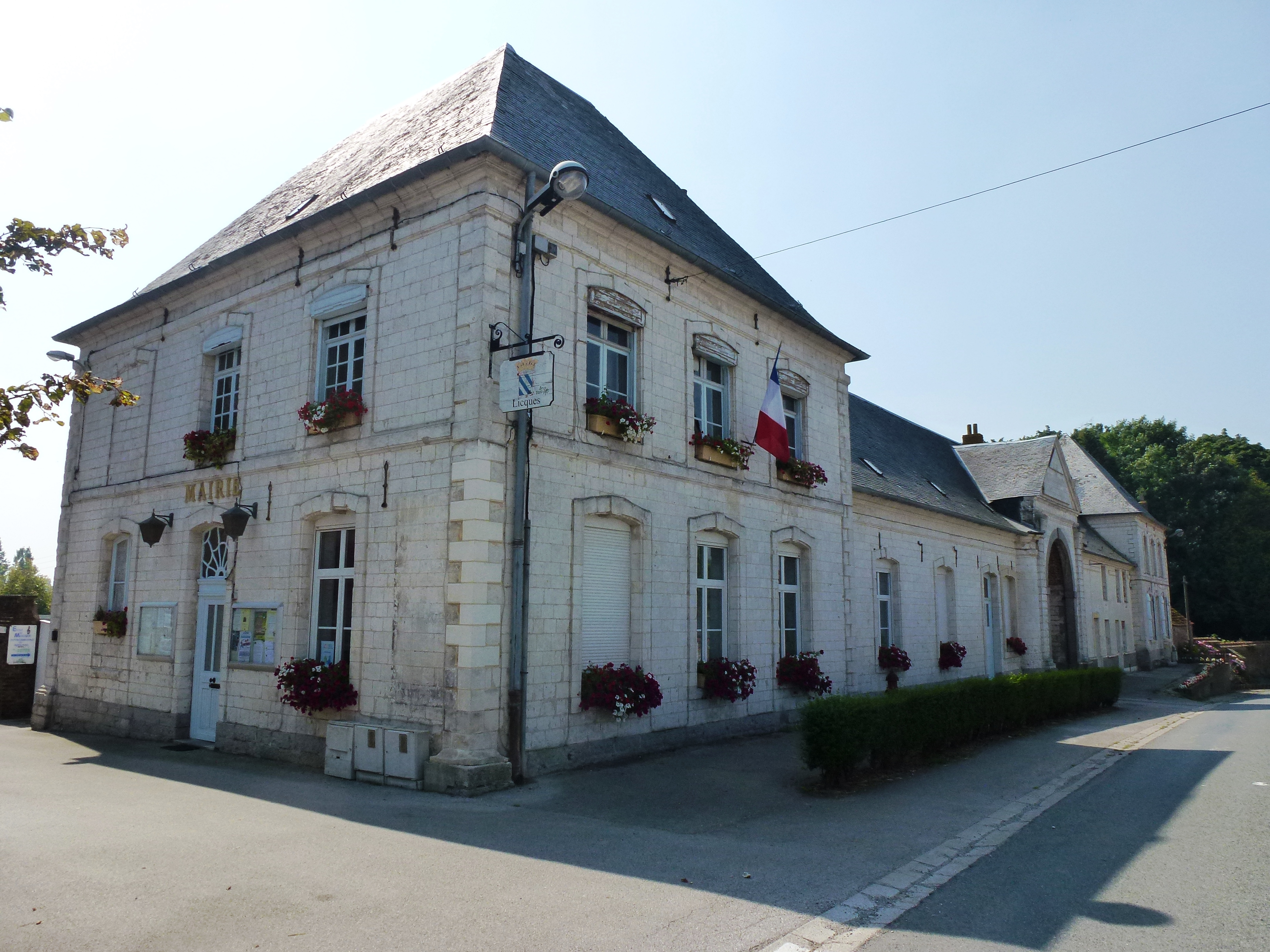
- The town hall of Licques

- Coat of arms
- Location of Licques
- Location within France Location within Hauts-de-France
- Coordinates: 50°47′09″N 1°56′15″E
- Country: France
- Region: Hauts-de-France
- Department: Pas-de-Calais
- Arrondissement: Calais
- Canton: Calais-2
- Intercommunality: CC Pays d'Opale

Government
  - Mayor (2020–2026): Brigitte Havart
- Area^{1}: 18.36 km^{2} (7.09 sq mi)
- Elevation: 87 m (285 ft)
- Highest elevation: 176 m (577 ft)
- Lowest elevation: 52 m (171 ft)
- Population (2023): 1,679
  - Density: 91.45/km^{2} (236.9/sq mi)
- Time zone: UTC+01:00 (CET)
  - Summer (DST): UTC+02:00 (CEST)
- INSEE/Postal code: 62506 /62850
- ^{1} French Land Register data, which excludes lakes, ponds, glaciers > 1 km^{2} (0.386 sq mi or 247 acres) and river estuaries.

Licques (French pronunciation: [lik]) is a commune in the Pas-de-Calais department in the Hauts-de-France region of France 24 km south of Calais in the valley of the Hem. It is a large producer of turkeys and other fowl.

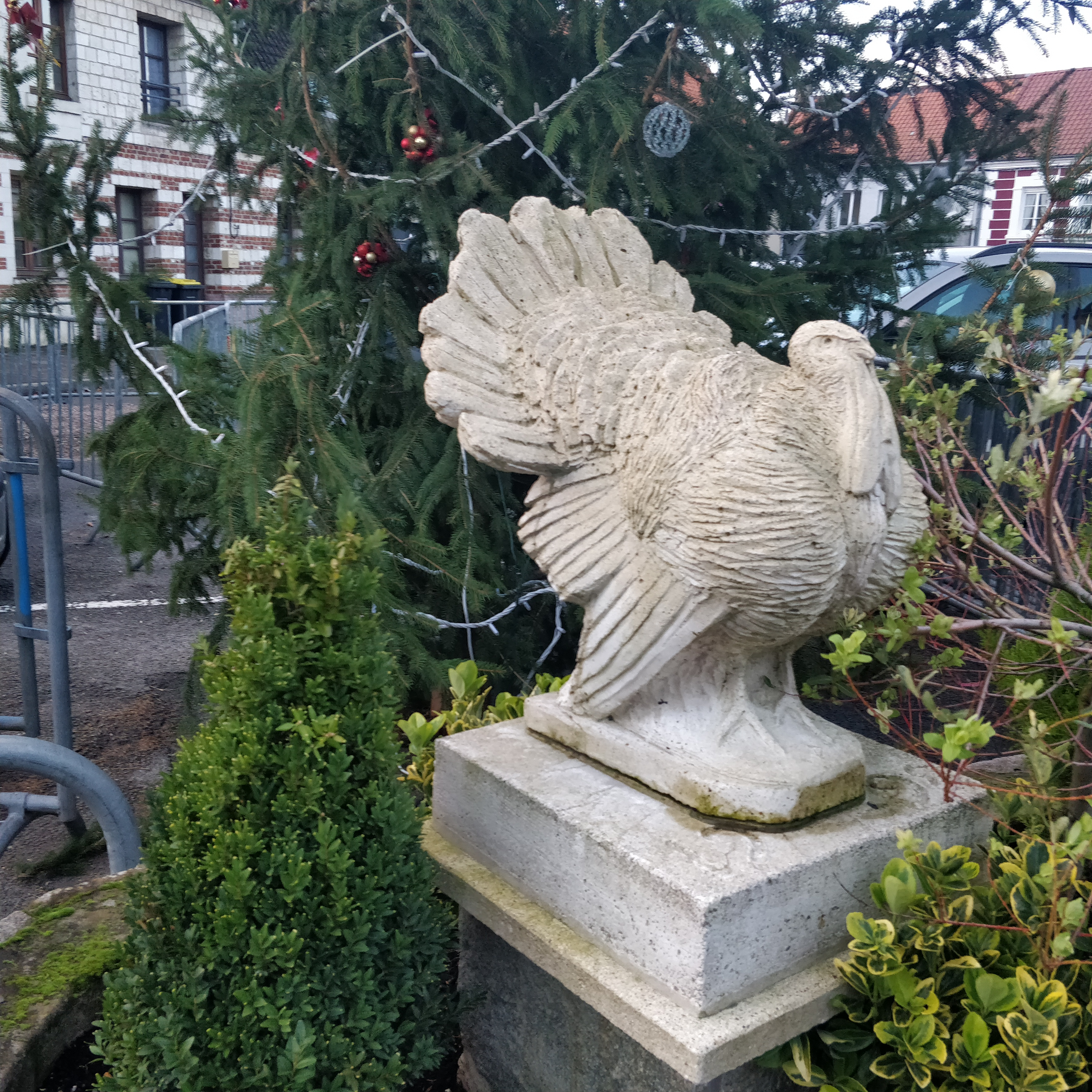
Licques turkey statue

== Population ==
Historical population
Year	Pop.	±% p.a.
1968	1,307	—
1975	1,389	+0.87%
1982	1,387	−0.02%
1990	1,351	−0.33%
1999	1,440	+0.71%
2007	1,520	+0.68%
2012	1,585	+0.84%
2017	1,631	+0.57%
2023	1,679	+0.48%
Source: INSEE

== Transport ==
The Chemin de fer de Boulogne à Bonningues (CF de BB) opened a station at Licques on 22 April 1900 which closed in 1948.

== Notable person ==
- Léon Bence (1929–1987), physician, was born in Licques

== Turkey festival ==
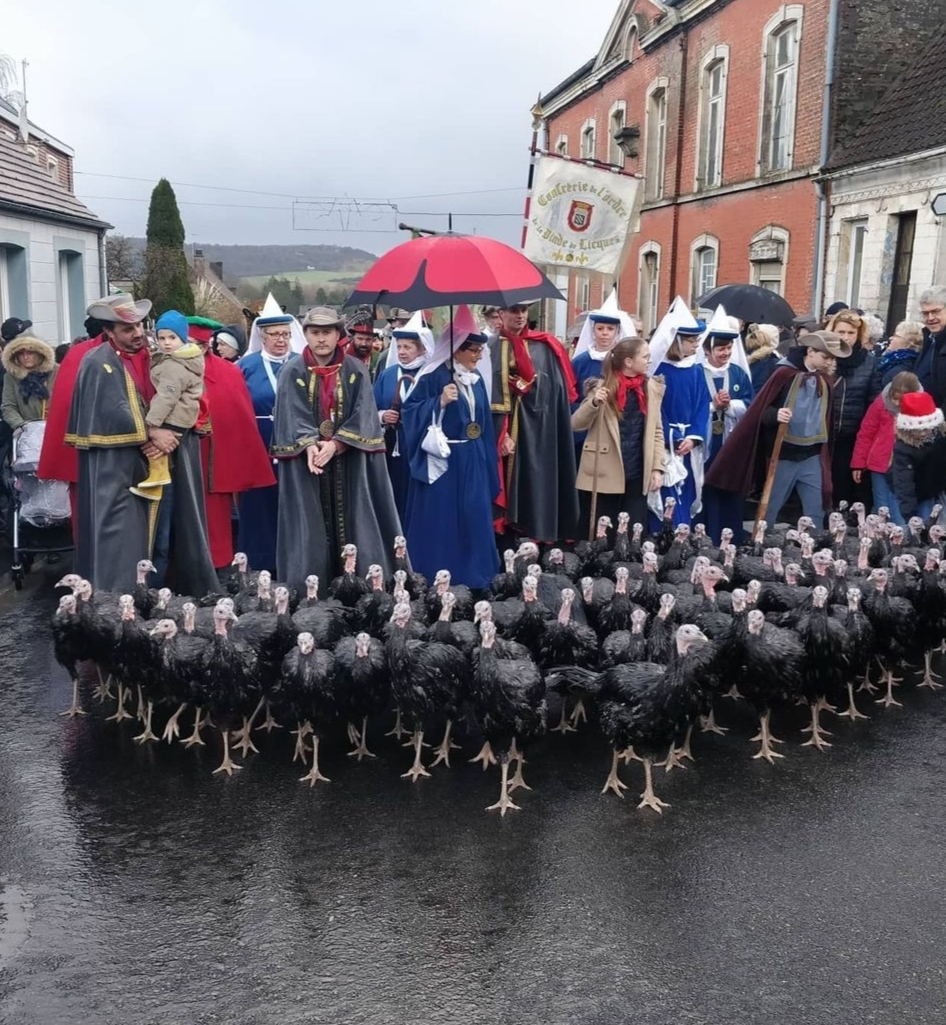
Parade of the Turkeys

Licques holds an annual turkey festival, which features a parade of local notables in traditional robes and costumes herding turkeys through the town center, led by the Noble Dames and Knights of the Brotherhood of the Turkey. In the past, a local liqueur was served heated from a communal cauldron set up in the town square, but this has been replaced in recent years by turkey soup.

Cultural events are staged throughout the day, and a large farmer's market is set up, selling turkeys and other local produce.

== See also ==
- Communes of the Pas-de-Calais department
