= Colembert =

Colembert Kolesberg
- Commune
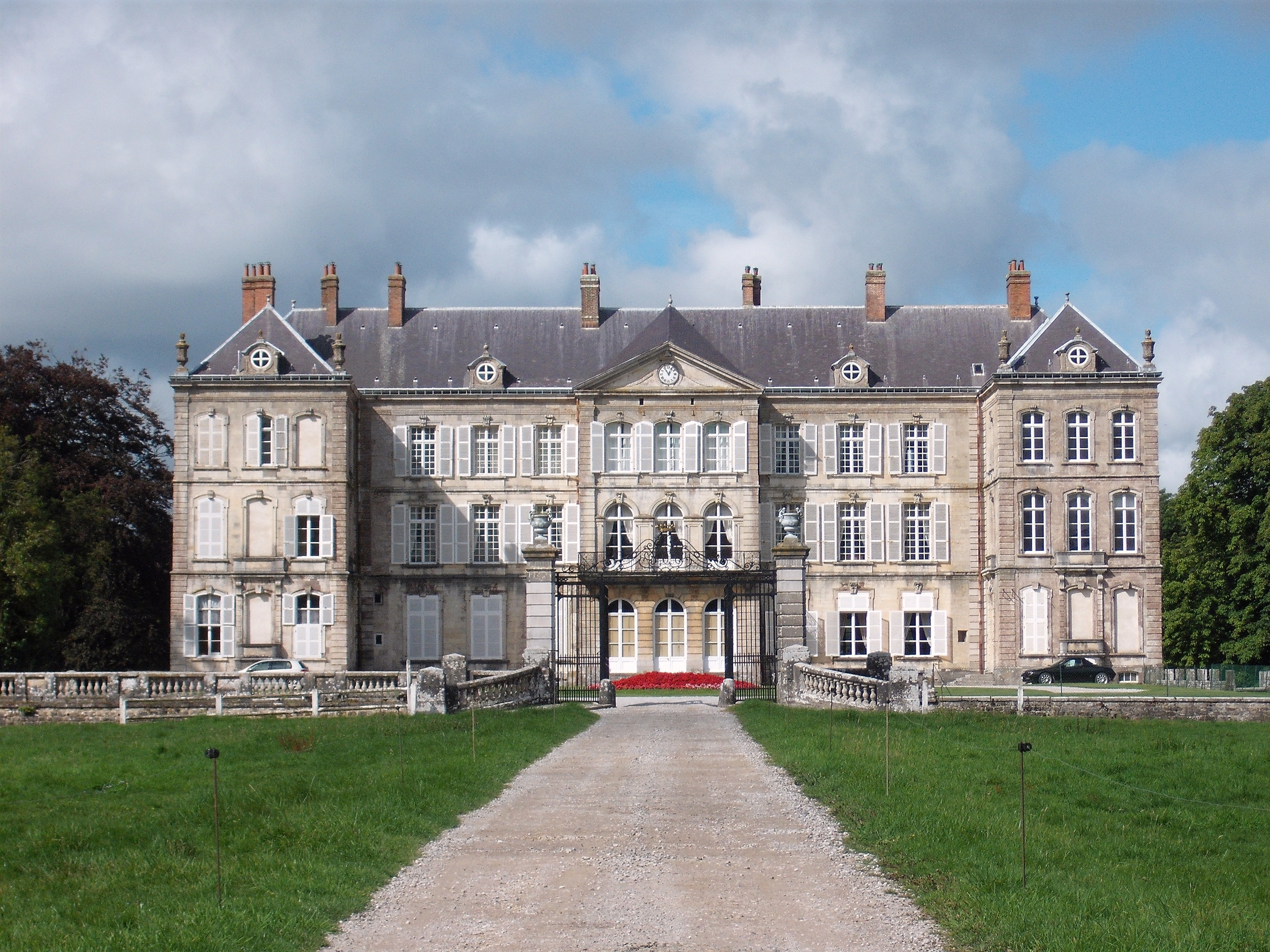
- The chateau of Colembert

- Coat of arms
- Location of Colembert
- Location within France Location within Hauts-de-France
- Coordinates: 50°44′50″N 1°50′33″E
- Country: France
- Region: Hauts-de-France
- Department: Pas-de-Calais
- Arrondissement: Boulogne-sur-Mer
- Canton: Desvres
- Intercommunality: CC Desvres-Samer

Government
  - Mayor (2020–2026): Étienne Maes
- Area^{1}: 9.92 km^{2} (3.83 sq mi)
- Elevation: 107 m (351 ft)
- Highest elevation: 202 m (663 ft)
- Lowest elevation: 44 m (144 ft)
- Population (2023): 907
  - Density: 91.4/km^{2} (237/sq mi)
- Time zone: UTC+01:00 (CET)
  - Summer (DST): UTC+02:00 (CEST)
- INSEE/Postal code: 62230 /62142
- ^{1} French Land Register data, which excludes lakes, ponds, glaciers > 1 km^{2} (0.386 sq mi or 247 acres) and river estuaries.

Colembert (French pronunciation: [kɔlɑ̃bɛʁ]; West Flemish: Kolesberg) is a commune in the Pas-de-Calais department in the Hauts-de-France region of France.

== Geography ==
A farming commune, some 12 miles (19 km) east of Boulogne, at the junction of the D252, D253 and the N42 roads.

== Population ==
Historical population
Year	Pop.	±% p.a.
1968	507	—
1975	447	−1.78%
1982	509	+1.87%
1990	588	+1.82%
1999	687	+1.74%
2007	730	+0.76%
2012	803	+1.92%
2017	942	+3.24%
2023	907	−0.63%
Source: INSEE

== Transport ==
The Chemin de fer de Boulogne à Bonningues (CF de BB) opened a station at Colembert on 22 April 1900. Passenger services were withdrawn on 31 December 1935. They were reinstated in November 1942. The CF de BB closed in 1948.

== Places of interest ==
- The church of St.Nicholas, dating from the eighteenth century.
- The eighteenth-century chateau.
- The manorhouse of La Cabocherie

== See also ==
- Communes of the Pas-de-Calais department
