= Dominic Toubeix =

French fashion designer (1924 - 2008)

Dominique Maurice Toubeix (24 September 1924 – 16 July 2008), usually known as Dominic Toubeix or simply Dominic, was a French fashion designer who worked for some time in New York in the 1960s.

== Early life and career ==
Toubeix was born in Paris, on 24 September 1924. He trained in the couture industry, first for Marcel Rochas, and then as an assistant to Antonio del Castillo whilst he was heading the house of Lanvin. Toubeix worked with Castillo for ten years. After Castillo was let go by Lanvin in 1962, Toubeix protested what he saw as his mentor's unfair treatment by throwing a rock through the window of the Lanvin establishment on the Rue d'Boissy Anglais, for which he spent a night in police custody. After this, Toubeix went to New York.

== New York career ==
In 1963, Toubeix became a partner in the firm of Matty Talmack, which was founded in 1949. He was not just head designer, but vice-president and secretary as well, and Matty Talmack commented "He says in clothes exactly what I think about fashion." Whilst in New York, he was mainly known by his first name, and as "Dominic of Matty Talmack" he won the 1966 Coty Award following a vote by 62 fashion editors. In 1967, Dominic Toubeix, Chester Weinberg and Luba Marks were noted as being "three fast-rising young ready-to-wear designers" who championed the midi-length dress as an alternative to the miniskirt in American fashion. In 1970, Dominic was designing for the New York branch of Dior when he was abruptly sacked by the Dior New York president, Henry Sherman, but was swiftly reinstated by Jacques Rouet from the Paris company, who sacked Sherman and assured Dominic of his indefinite contract. In 1973, Dominic was creating coats for a New York firm called Originalia.

== Later career ==
By July 1974, Toubeix was back in Paris and presenting a couture collection of luxurious separates under the name of his former mentor, Castillo.

== Death ==
Toubeix died in Paimbœuf on 16 July 2008, at the age of 83.
