= Piguet =

Piguet is a surname. Notable people with the surname include:

- Amédée Piguet (1904–1990), Swiss wrestler
- Charles Piguet (1859–1918), Swiss tutor
- Gabriel Piguet (1887–1952), Roman Catholic bishop
- Robert Piguet (1898–1953), Swiss fashion designer

== See also ==
- Audemars Piguet, company
