= Germaine Cellier =

French perfumer

- Born: March 26, 1909; Bordeaux, France
- Died: June 12, 1976 (aged 67); Clichy, Hauts-de-Seine, France
- Known for: Perfumery
- Notable work: Fracas, Bandit, Vent Vert

Germaine Cellier (French pronunciation: [ʒɛʁmɛn sɛlje]; 26 March 1909, Bordeaux – 12 June 1976, Clichy, Hauts-de-Seine) was a French perfumer. She was known for creating bold, pioneering fragrances such as Fracas and Bandit. Cellier was also one of the first prominent female perfumers, at a time when the industry was dominated by men.

== Early life ==
Cellier was born in Bordeaux, France in 1909. In 1930, she moved to Paris to study chemistry. After obtaining her degree, she went to work as a chemist for the French company Roure Bertrand. In 1943, she left Roure to work for Colgate-Palmolive as a functional perfumer, but returned to Roure after three months.

== Career ==
In the 1940s, Cellier met Robert Piguet, a former designer for Paul Poiret who had started his own fashion house. Piguet aspired to create young, vibrant fashions for the post-war period. In 1944, she created Bandit, one of the first leather chypres in perfumery. Cellier used 1% isobutyl quinoline to give Bandit an intense, leathery quality.

In 1947, she created Vent Vert for the house of Balmain, which contained an overdose of 8% galbanum, and was considered to be the first "green" perfume.

In 1948, she created Fracas, considered today to be the landmark tuberose fragrance. The formula, among other ingredients, contained Indian tuberose absolute, Tunisian orange blossom absolute, French jasmine, and Italian iris root butter.

Throughout her life, Cellier cultivated friendships with some of France's most famous figures, such as writer Jean Cocteau, actor François Périer, and Pierre Brisson, long-time editor of Le Figaro.

In 1999, Fashion Fragrances & Cosmetics, owner of the Piguet fragrances, launched re-orchestrated versions of Fracas and Bandit.

== Personal life ==
Cellier is frequently thought and reported to have been a lesbian. However, according to her niece Martine Azoulai, Cellier entered only relationships with men; first the painter Chas Laborde, then cartoonist Jean Oberlé, and finally, the tennis player Christian Boussus.

Cellier died at the age of 67 from pulmonary edema, a condition influenced both by her work with volatile chemicals and her love of smoking and alcohol.

== List of creations ==
=== Balenciaga ===
- La Fuite Des Heures (1949)

=== Balmain ===
- Elysees 64 83 (1946)
- Vent Vert (1947)
- Jolie Madame (1953)
- Monsieur Balmain (1964)
- Miss Balmain (1967)

=== Robert Piguet ===
- Bandit (1944)
- Visa (1945)
- Fracas (1948)
- Cravache (1963)

=== Nina Ricci ===
- Coeur Joie (1946)
