= Max Méreaux =

French composer

Max Méreaux (born October 1946) is a French composer.

He was born in Saint-Omer, near Calais, where he undertook his first music lessons. After gaining his baccalaureate in philosophy, Méreaux studied musical analysis at the Paris Conservatoire under Jacques Castérède.

Méreaux is a music teacher and educational advisor, and adheres to a particular interest in "active teaching methods". Subsequently, Méreaux has composed several didactic works.

He is known for his books on musical therapy written in collaboration with Dr. Léon Bence. Additionally, Méreaux has composed several chamber and orchestral works.

== Works ==
- Pentacle pour orchestre symphonique.
- Rituel pour orchestre d’harmonie et percussions.
- Alturas de Macchu Picchu pour baryton et orchestre symphonique sur un poème espagnol de Pablo Neruda.
- Hommage à Rameau (pour flûte, clarinette, trompette, piano et orchestre à cordes).
- Concerto pour violon et onze instruments à cordes œuvre primée au Concours International de Composition Valentino BUCCHI de Rome en novembre 1981.
- Concerto pour violon et douze instruments à cordes dedicated to Tibor Varga
- Cosmogonie pour flûte, hautbois, clarinette en la, basson, cor en fa, clavecin et quatuor à cordes.
- Noctuor pour 2 hautbois, 2 clarinettes, 2 cors en fa et 2 bassons.
- Solstice pour quintette à vent pour flûte, cor anglais, clarinette en si bémol, cor en fa et basson.
- Divertimento pour 4 cors en fa.
- Coïncidences quatuor à cordes.
- Prélude et fugue pour quatuor de saxophones.
- Sonate à trois pour clarinette en si bémol, violoncelle et piano.
- Polysonance pour hautbois, harpe et violoncelle.
- Moment pour orgue.
- Sonatine pour piano.
- Aria, toccata et fugue pour piano.
- Élégie pour flûte à bec alto.
- Isthme pour flûte à bec ténor et guitare.
- Melodia pour hautbois seul.
- Entrelacs pour cor anglais et piano.
- Lamento pour clarinette et piano.
- Hymne pour cor seul.
- Contemplation pour trompette seule.
- Fata Morgana pour trompette et piano.
- Psaume pour trombone seul.
- Sibylle pour trombone et piano.
- Arcane pour saxhorn basse en si bémol et piano.
- Sonnet de Louise Labé pour voix de mezzo-Soprano et piano.
- Te rogamus pour voix de Soprano et piano ou orgue.
- Soledad pour violon seul.
- Offrande pour violon et piano.
- Préludes à trois légendes pour alto seul.
- Idylle pour alto seul.
- Invocation pour alto et piano.
- Calligramme pour viole de gambe.
- Melancholia pour violoncelle et piano.
- Le gardien du seuil pour contrebasse et piano.
- Sonatine pour guitare et piano
