= Bonningues-lès-Ardres =

Bonningues-lès-Ardres Boninge
- Commune
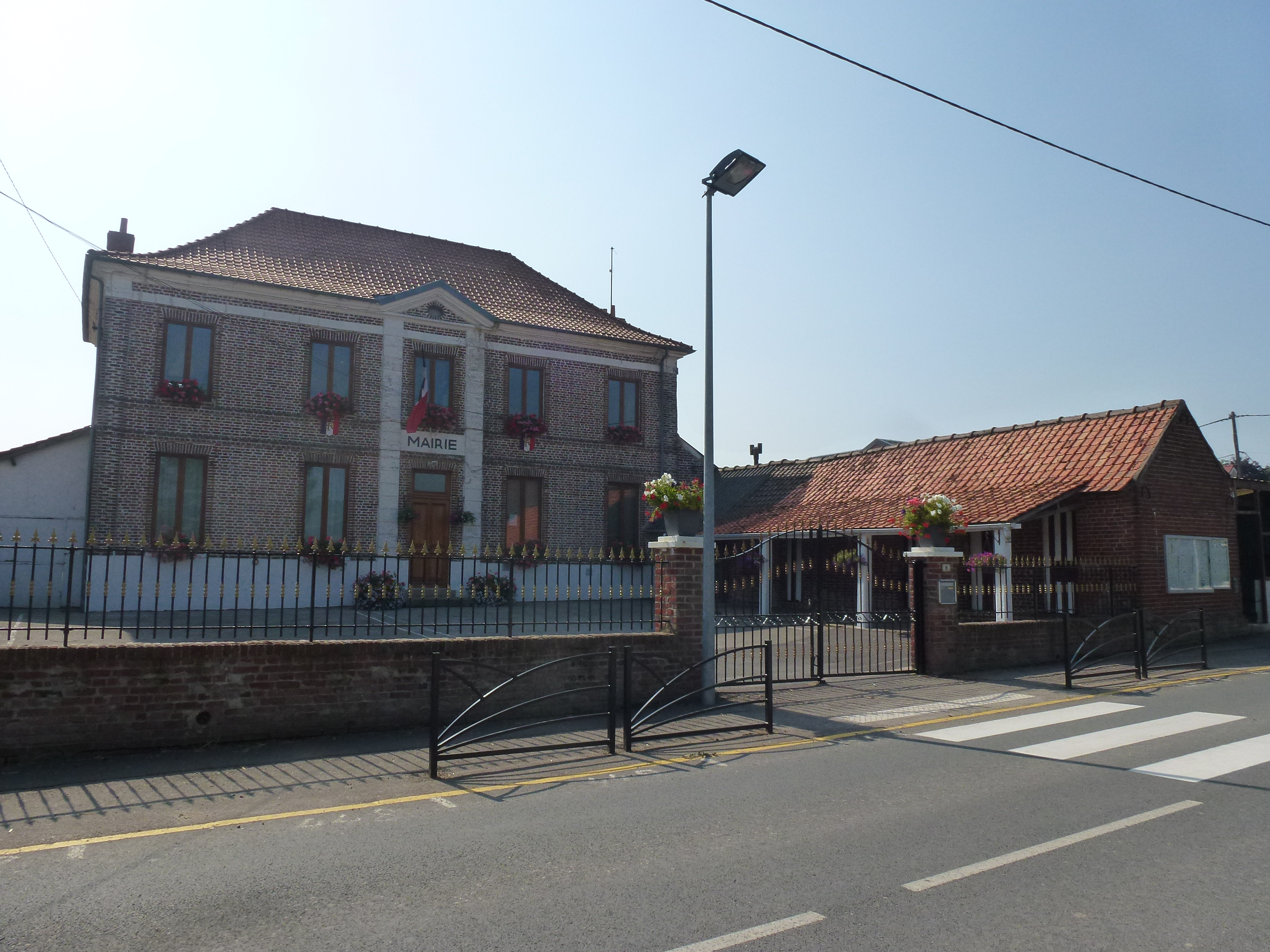
- The town hall of Bonningues-lès-Ardres

- Coat of arms
- Location of Bonningues-lès-Ardres
- Location within France Location within Hauts-de-France
- Coordinates: 50°47′37″N 2°00′56″E
- Country: France
- Region: Hauts-de-France
- Department: Pas-de-Calais
- Arrondissement: Saint-Omer
- Canton: Lumbres
- Intercommunality: Pays de Lumbres

Government
  - Mayor (2020–2026): Gérard Franque
- Area^{1}: 10.6 km^{2} (4.1 sq mi)
- Elevation: 43 m (141 ft)
- Highest elevation: 184 m (604 ft)
- Lowest elevation: 34 m (112 ft)
- Population (2023): 637
  - Density: 60.1/km^{2} (156/sq mi)
- Time zone: UTC+01:00 (CET)
  - Summer (DST): UTC+02:00 (CEST)
- INSEE/Postal code: 62155 /62890
- ^{1} French Land Register data, which excludes lakes, ponds, glaciers > 1 km^{2} (0.386 sq mi or 247 acres) and river estuaries.

Bonningues-lès-Ardres (French pronunciation: [bɔnɛ̃ɡ lɛ.z‿aʁdʁ], literally Bonningues near Ardres; West Flemish: Boninge) is a commune in the Pas-de-Calais department in the Hauts-de-France region in northern France.

== Geography ==
A village situated 10 miles (16 km) northwest of Saint-Omer, on theD217 road.

== Population ==
Historical population
Year	Pop.	±% p.a.
1968	451	—
1975	401	−1.66%
1982	457	+1.89%
1990	443	−0.39%
1999	509	+1.56%
2007	615	+2.39%
2012	690	+2.33%
2017	656	−1.01%
2023	637	−0.49%
Source: INSEE

== Sights ==
- The church of St. Leger, dating from the sixteenth century.

== Transport ==
The Chemin de fer d'Anvin à Calais (CF AC) opened a railway station at Bonningues-lès-Ardres in 1881. In 1900, the Chemin de fer de Boulogne à Bonningues (CF BB) opened. The CF BB closed in 1948, the CF AC closed in 1955.

== See also ==
- Communes of the Pas-de-Calais department
