= Robert Piguet =

Swiss-born, Paris-based fashion designer (1898–1953)

- Born: 6 May 1898; Yverdon-les-Bains, Switzerland
- Died: 22 February 1953 (aged 54); Lausanne, Switzerland
- Known for: Haute Couture

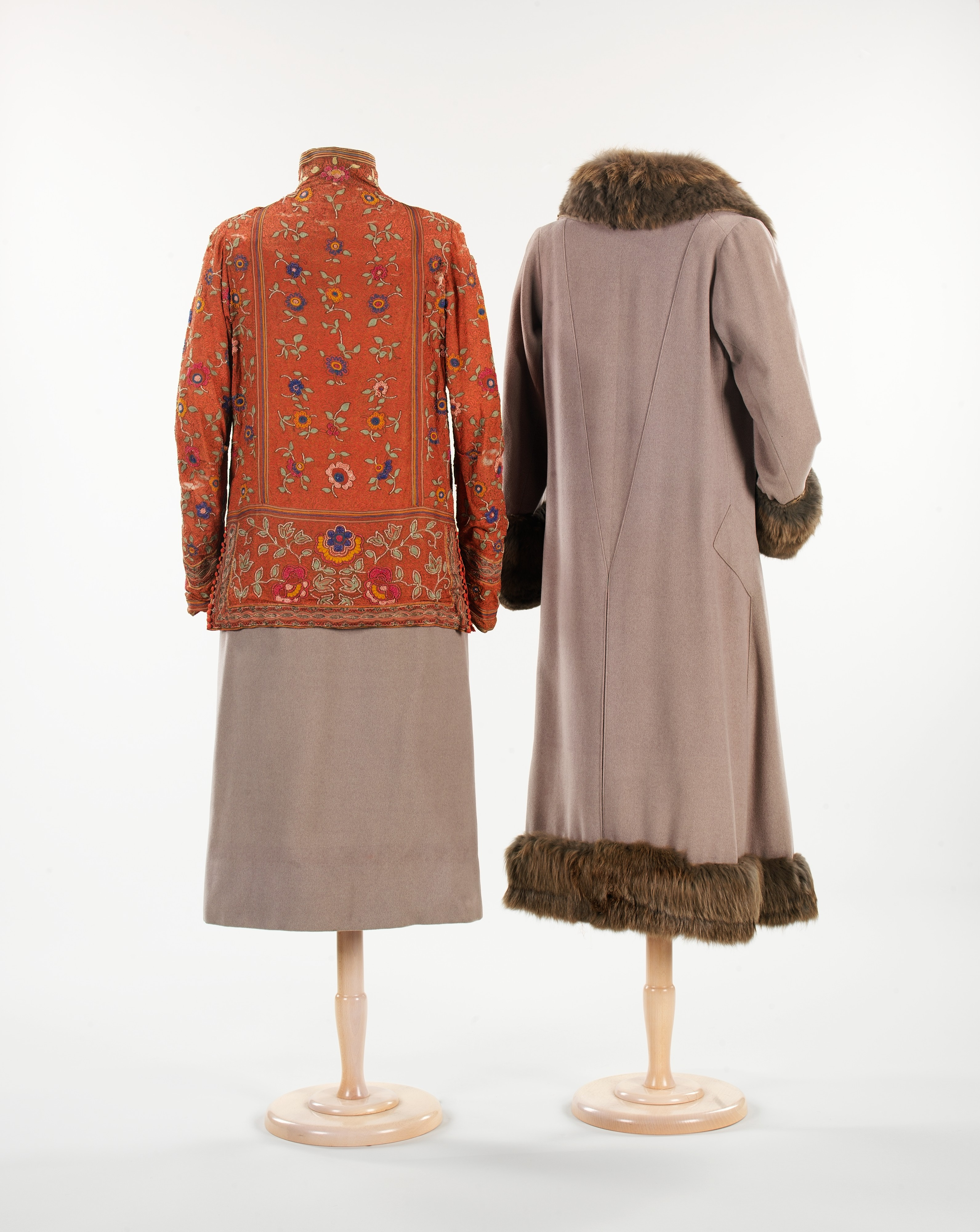
Redfern Paris by Piguet, 1930

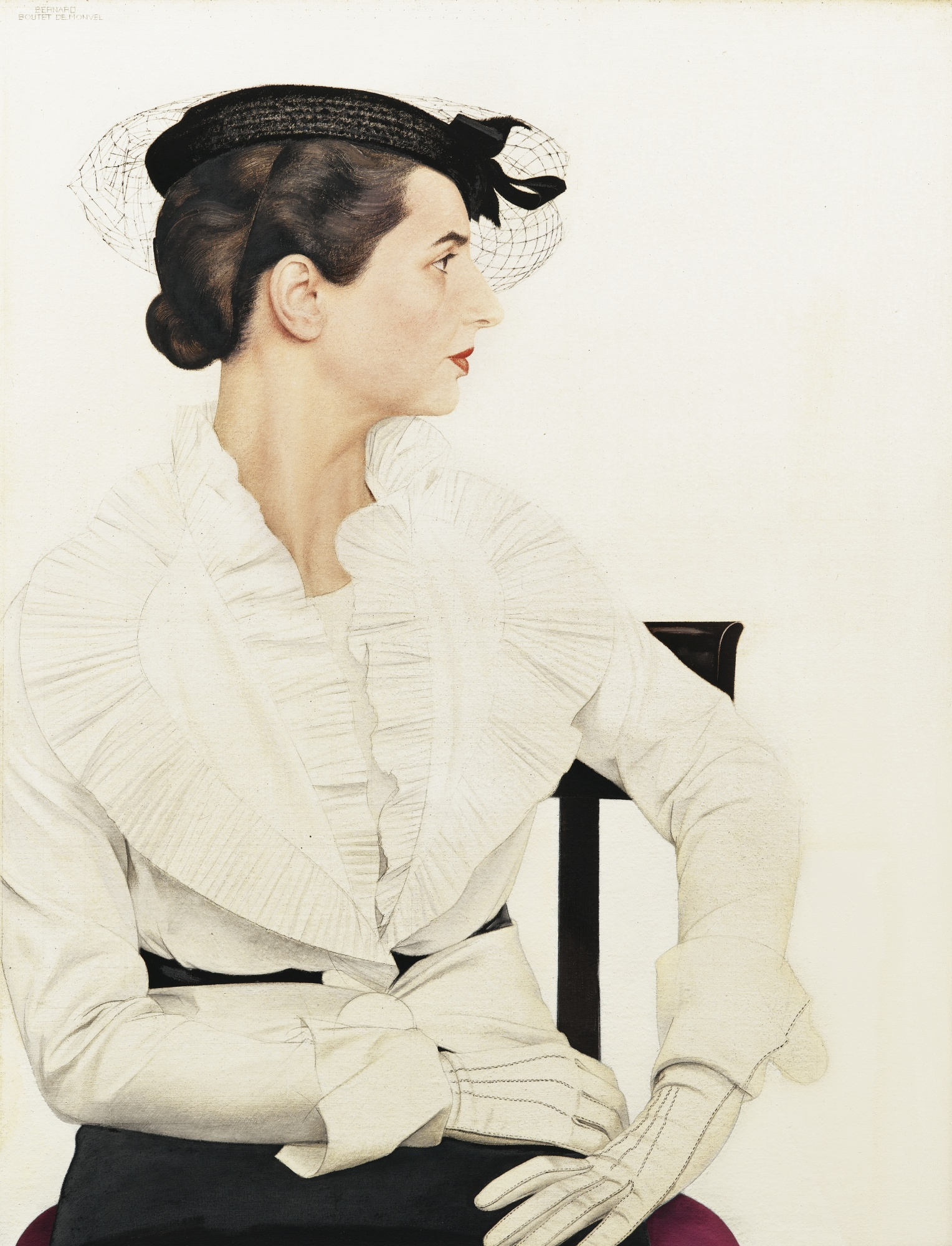
Delfina Boutet de Monvel in a Piguet Day Suit, 1936

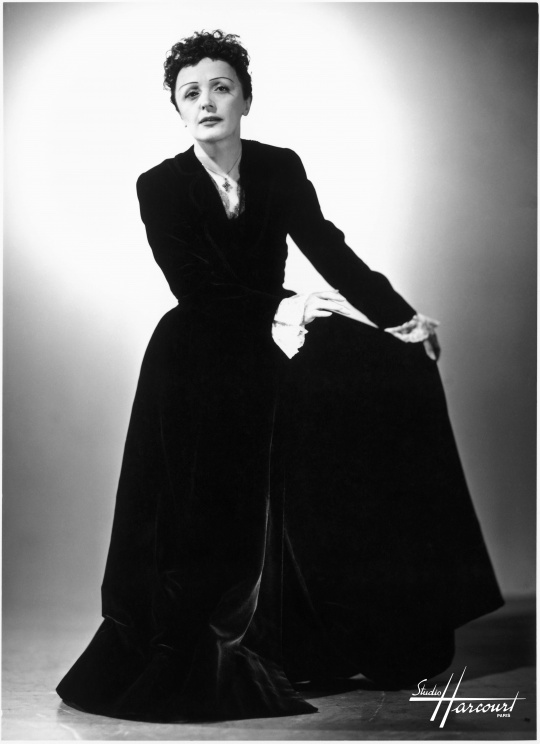
Edith Piaf in a Piguet Gown, 1950

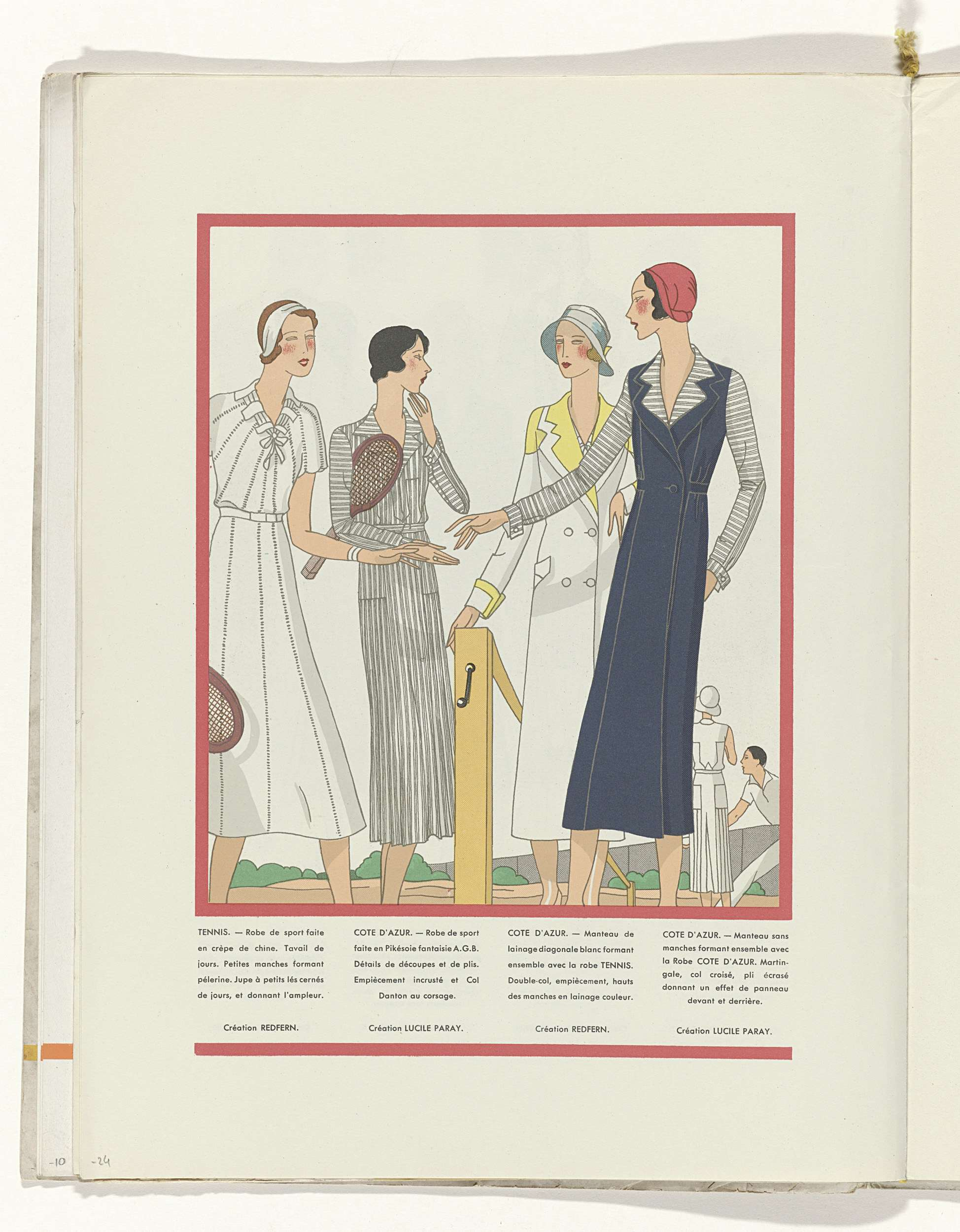
From the 1931 Redfern Paris Catalogue

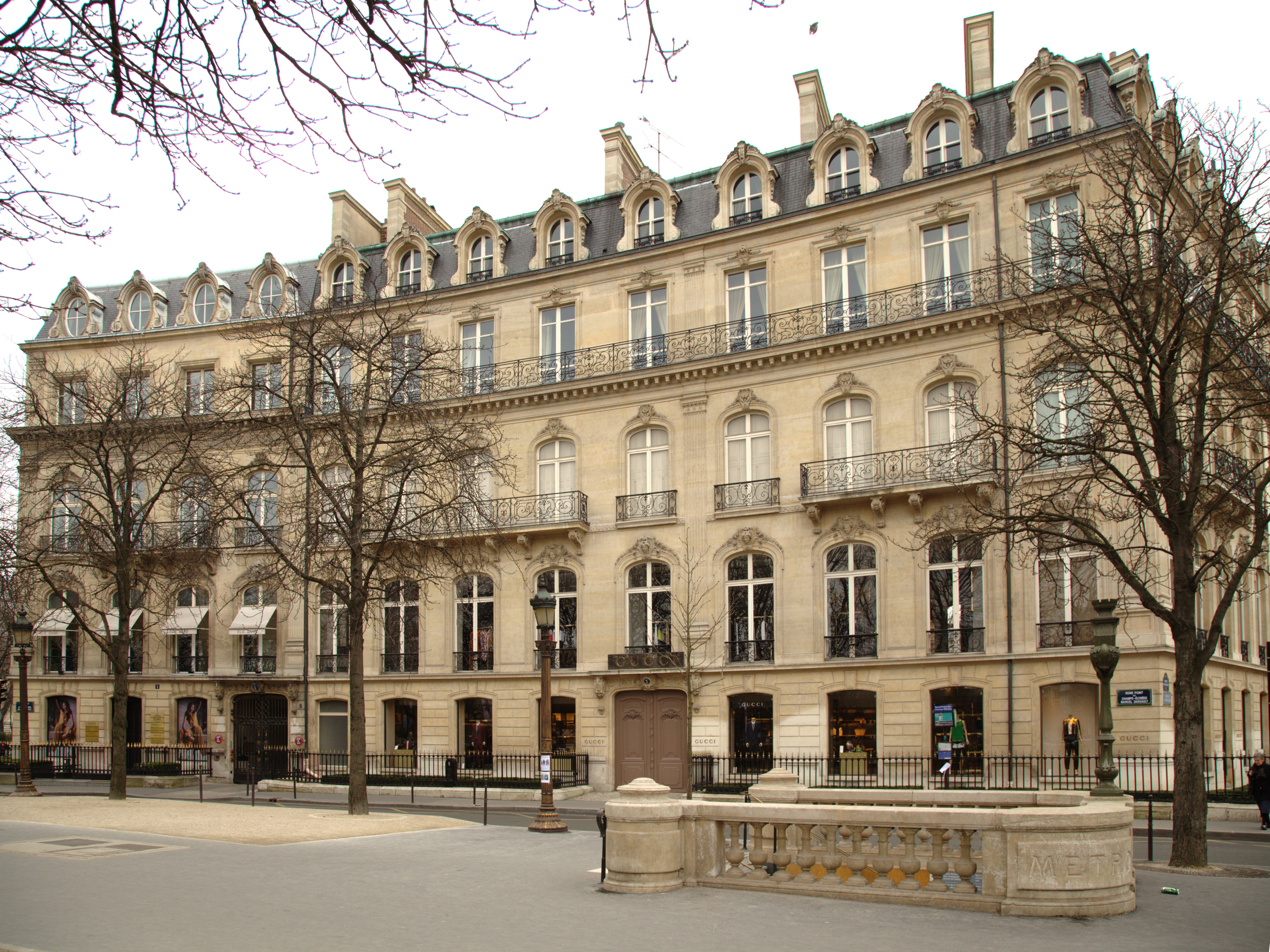
The House of Piguet

Robert Piguet (French pronunciation: [ʁɔbɛʁ piɡɛ]; 1898 – 1953) was a Swiss fashion designer who was highly influential in the development of haute couture. The House of Piguet in Paris ran from 1933 to 1951, during which time Piguet was known as "The Prince of Fashion".

== Early life and education ==
Paul Jean Robert Piguet was born on May 6, 1898 in the Swiss resort town of Yverdon-les-Bains. He was the youngest of four sons of Armand Piguet and Elise Michaud. His was a strict Protestant family, and a wealthy one; his maternal grandfather owned a bank, which Armand and his brother took over and named Banque Piguet. Armand also owned the Banque d'Escompte et de Dépôt and was a member of the Swiss Federal Council. Robert, or "Bob", as he was called, was educated first at home, and then spent six years as a boarder at École nouvelle de la Suisse romande, in nearby Lausanne. He developed a passion for fabric and became interested in batik, He began making hand-painted scarves; by age 15, he was making blouses and, at age 18, he was able to host an exhibition at the Lausanne department store Bonnarde. His first job was sourcing fabric and designing shoes for the Swiss luxury fashion house Bally. When the war ended in 1918, he moved to Paris.

== Career ==
With funding from his family, Piguet secured a place at 41 rue de la Montagne, an expensive location just vacated by Callot Soeurs. He was targeting the same market—the wives of financiers, politicians and industrialists, who were the same sort of people he had grown up with. He cultivated them by inviting them to "Salons d'art moderne" (Modern Art Salons), twice-weekly afternoon teas where he would sell hand-painted and batik garments. In 1920, he was able to present his first show, which was 30 designs against an Oriental backdrop. Some were highly unorthodox—a fur-trimmed white tulle lantern skirt over a lamé dress, or silver gauze culottes with feathers. Most were something women had not yet seen: impeccably tailored separates which allowed for both elegance and versatility. The show was a huge success. However, Piguet had not learned how to run a business and he was out of money. He was forced to close his atelier.

Piguet had been a sickly child and was plagued by ill health. Although he was only 22, he was suffering from exhaustion and spent some time resting in Italy and Africa before returning to Lausanne, where he designed costumes for local theatrical productions. Two years later, in 1922, he returned to Paris, this time with the offer of a job as an assistant to the couturier Paul Poiret. After a year there, and as Poiret's business neared collapse, he was hired by the British couture house Redfern. Redfern, which had long been dressing the British aristocracy, had become stuffy; Piguet infused youthful vitality into the house. He was mentored by Charles Poynter (Redfern), who ran the Paris branch. As Poynter's health declined, Piguet became more prominent; it was likely Piguet who created Redfern's "Casino" line, garments designed for women to wear at European resort casinos. When Poynter died in 1929, Piguet became the chief designer at Redfern Paris. In 1932, an American author writing on Paris fashion commented that he "would probably select Robert Piguet, the designer at Redfern's, as the ideal Parisian dressmaker." Also in 1932, Redfern closed its Paris branch.

Piguet was now ready to open his own house. He had received an inheritance when his father died in 1929, and his brother George arranged for an investment from the Clavel family. Robert's time at Redfern had taught him about the financial side of fashion but, this time, George managed the business. In 1933, Piguet launched his own fashion house on the Rue du Cirque. It was an immediate success. Piguet became the trend-setter and the arbiter of good taste. He dressed women in slim dresses with matching jackets, crisp coats and romantic gowns in brilliant colors. His clothes were known for refinement, precision and the quality of their fabric. His daywear was particularly popular and women flocked to his salon for his thin silk suits in pale shades with white at the neck and cuffs. Vogue declared him the "master of the little wool dress". He became known as "the most Parisian of fashion designers". His salon drew clients from all over the world, notably most of the ladies of the Egyptian royal court, including Queen Farida and Princess Fawzia. He was also popular with the actresses of the day, including Edwige Feuillère, Gabrielle Dorziat, and Edith Piaf—it was Piguet who designed Piaf's famous black dresses, or what she called her "work overalls". Later, while other New Look designers went with large flared skirts, Piguet's little black dresses remained the same: unadorned crêpe de Chine, straight-cut and understated.

In 1938, Piguet moved to a much larger space at 3, Rond-Point des Champs-Élysées, one of the most prestigious addresses in Paris, which had a private entrance on Avenue Montaigne. He was the first to come up with the idea of separate boutiques within a haute couture house. The walls of his show rooms were covered in his own hand-painted draperies. In one room, an entire wall was taken up by a painting by his close friend Christian Bérard; in another, the ceiling was done in a fresco by Étienne Drian. In each room, accessories were displayed in flower-sellers' carts. On the top floor was his own space; Piguet was naturally reclusive and often retreated from his staff, spending hours listening to Debussy and dictating instructions while lying down. He now employed 400 people, and was supervising other designers rather than designing anything himself. He maintained a philosophy of helping young designers whenever he could. He was the first to buy Pierre Balmain's sketches, gave James Galanos a three-month internship and employed, for up to two years each, Christian Dior, Hubert de Givenchy, Marc Bohan, Antonio Castillo, and Serge Guérin. It was Piguet who brought Dior into the world of haute couture, and Dior would later say: "Robert Piguet taught me that a garment is about fabric, colors, shapes, and the woman living inside it—and that fittings are what truly matter. He taught me the virtues of simplicity through which true elegance must come."

In 1939, Piguet held a successful show in London and was considering opening a salon there when war was declared. While many designers closed their businesses during the Occupation, Piguet thrived. During the war, his relationship with Bally continued; when Max Matter became Bally's creative director in 1941, he called on Piguet, who played a crucial role in the development of the company's creative department. Where Piguet's style for women had been one of youthful vitality, the war brought a darker look to his creations—in one show, he accessorized his models with gas masks. For the first time, due to supply issues, he used synthetic fabrics and, where he had rarely advertised before, he collaborated with the Italian fashion illustrator René Gruau to produce promotional materials. After the war, he joined other couturiers in presenting the New Look, but his version focused on comfort and easy elegance. He also participated in the Théâtre de la Mode (1945), an traveling exhibition of miniature wire dolls styled in the latest haute couture.

During the war, Piguet also returned to costume design. In films, he dressed Marie Déa in Personal Column (1939), Arletty in Bolero (1942), Edwige Feuillère in Woman Hater (1948), Annabella in Dernier Amour (1949) and Jean Wallace and Patricia Roc in The Man on the Eiffel Tower (1950). Most of Piguet's close friends were artists, writers and actors, particularly Jean Marais, Jean Cocteau, Sacha Guitry, Louis Jouvet, Jean Giraudoux, Jean-Louis Barrault, and Colette. He had designed the costumes for the 1934 debut of Cocteau's La Machine Infernale and Jouvet's hit play Margot (1935) but, during the Occupation, he did much more for his friends, often free of charge and without credit. Guitry selected Piguet dresses for many of his plays. Piguet designed the costumes for, among other stage productions, Jouvet's L’Annonce faite à Marie (1942), the 1949 revival of Colette's Chéri, and Marais' 1951 production of Britannicus.

In the early 1940s, Piguet began to collaborate with the perfumer Germaine Cellier. The result was four perfumes: Bandit (1942), Visa (1945), Fracas (1948) and Baghari (1950). All were like nothing women had experienced before, and all were best-sellers. Bandit, a highly sensual perfume which became the signature scent of Marlene Dietrich, remains one of the most famous leather fragrances in history—when it was introduced in the USA, the models carried toy guns and knives. Fracas, Piguet's most successful perfume, was the first significant tuberose scent of the 20th century and remains the benchmark by which tuberose scents are measured. Of Fracas, The New York Times wrote: "There are perfume legends, there are perfumer legends, and then there are perfumes that become obsessions. Fracas is all three." As his fragrances continued to be best-sellers after his death, Piguet's estate licensed his name to other parties. As of 2026, there are 13 fragrances produced under Piguet's name.

As the 1950s approached, it was clear that the future lay in ready-to-wear clothing. With Jean Gaumont-Lanvin, the House of Paquin, Jean Dessès, Madame Carven and Jacques Fath, Piguet founded Couturiers Associés (Associated Couturiers), a short-lived co-operative which allowed luxury ready-to-wear to be shown, on a group basis, in markets throughout Europe. By late 1950, however, Piguet's health was failing. After making sure that all of his staff members had job opportunities, he wrapped up his business and, on July 15, 1951, shut his doors and returned to Switzerland.

== Personal life, death and legacy ==
In 1924, Piguet married Mathilde Fortuna Henriquez, a wealthy aristocrat ten years his senior. They did not live together. Piguet was a reserved person who loathed parties; Mathilde was the opposite and, for the rest of his career, acted as his muse and publicist.

Piguet owned three homes: a house in Auteuil, where Mathilde lived, a palatial apartment on Paris' quai Malaquais, and a country home in Villeneuve, near Lausanne. He died in a Lausanne hospital, due to complications from surgery, on 22 February 1953, at age 54. His ashes were scattered at his Villeneuve estate. In his will, he left five million francs to his staff.

The Swiss Museum of Fashion (MuMode) in Yverdon-les-Bains houses a collection of Piguet's creations, as well as 3,000 sketches. It also established the Prix Robert Piguet, which is awarded to young Swiss designers, researchers and fashion students.

== Gallery ==
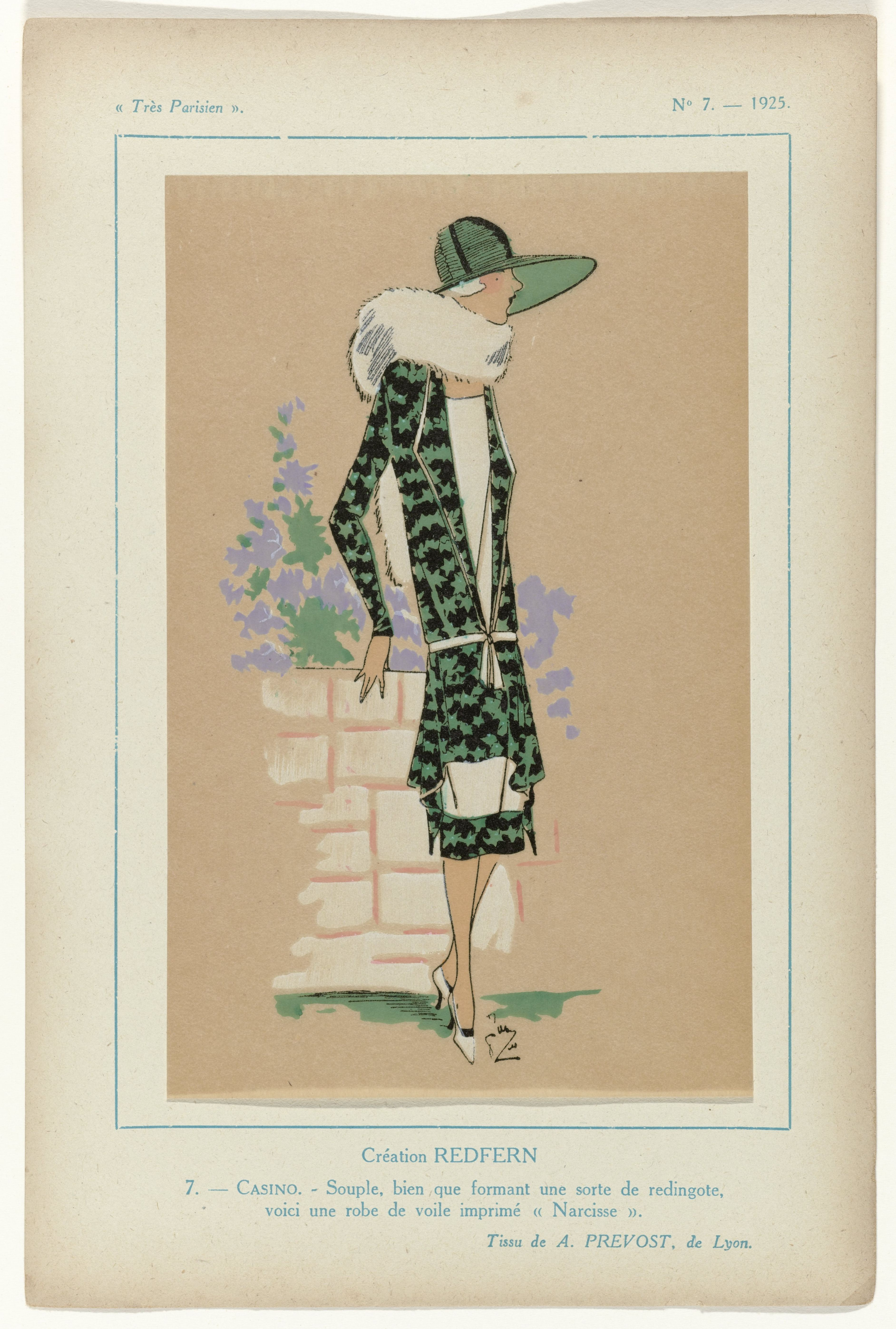
The Redfern Casino Dress

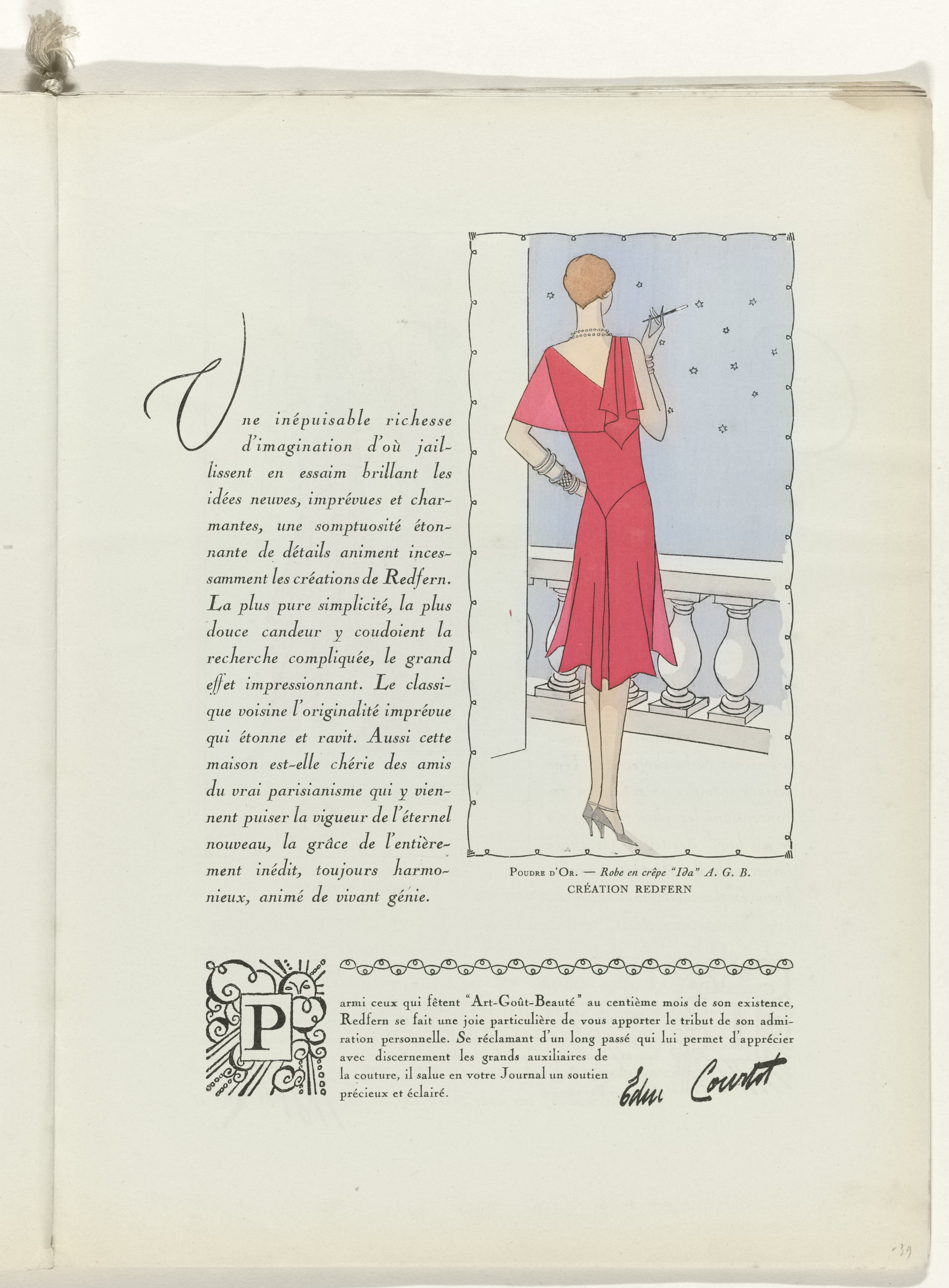
From the 1928 Redfern Paris Catalogue

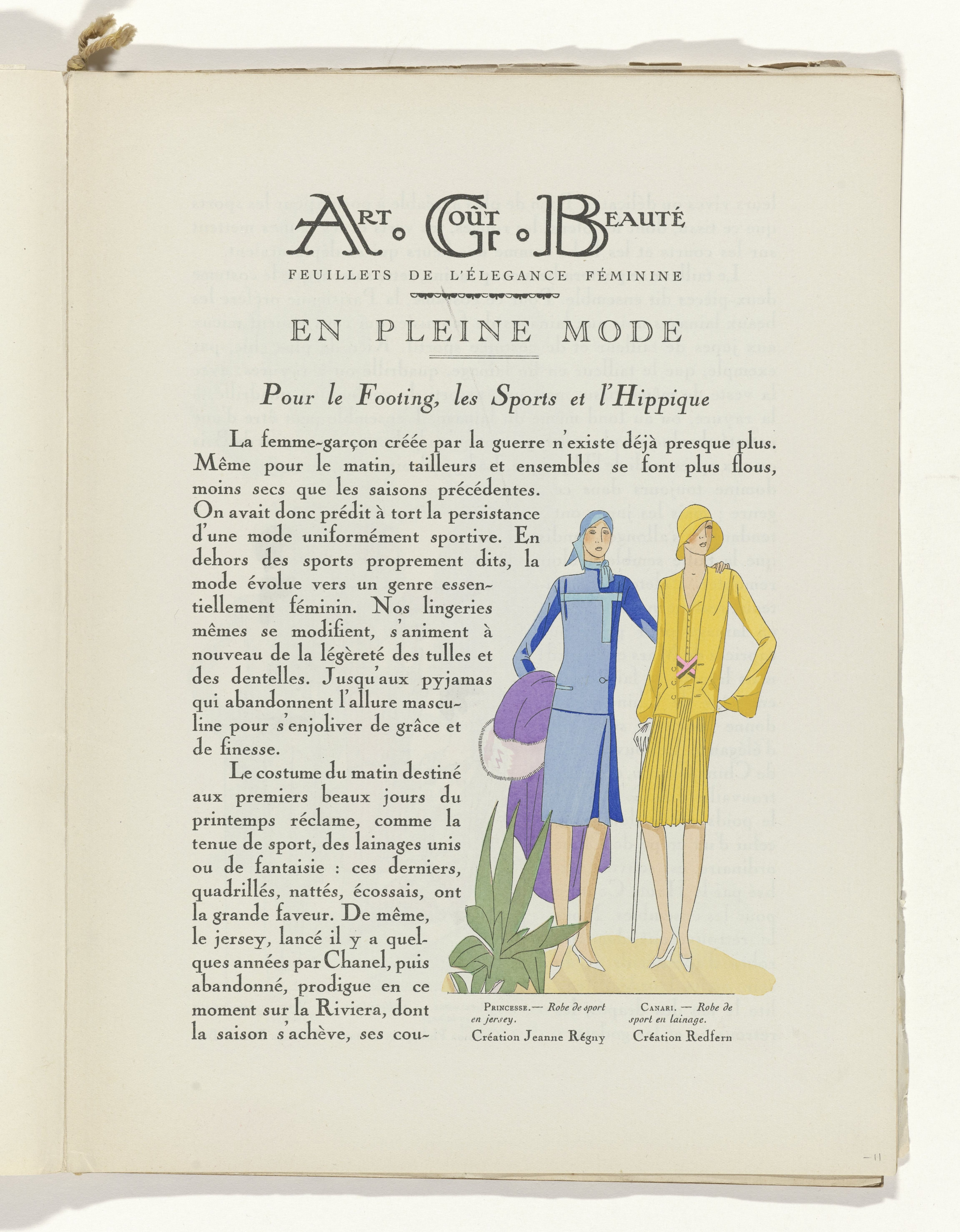
From the 1929 Redfern Paris Catalogue

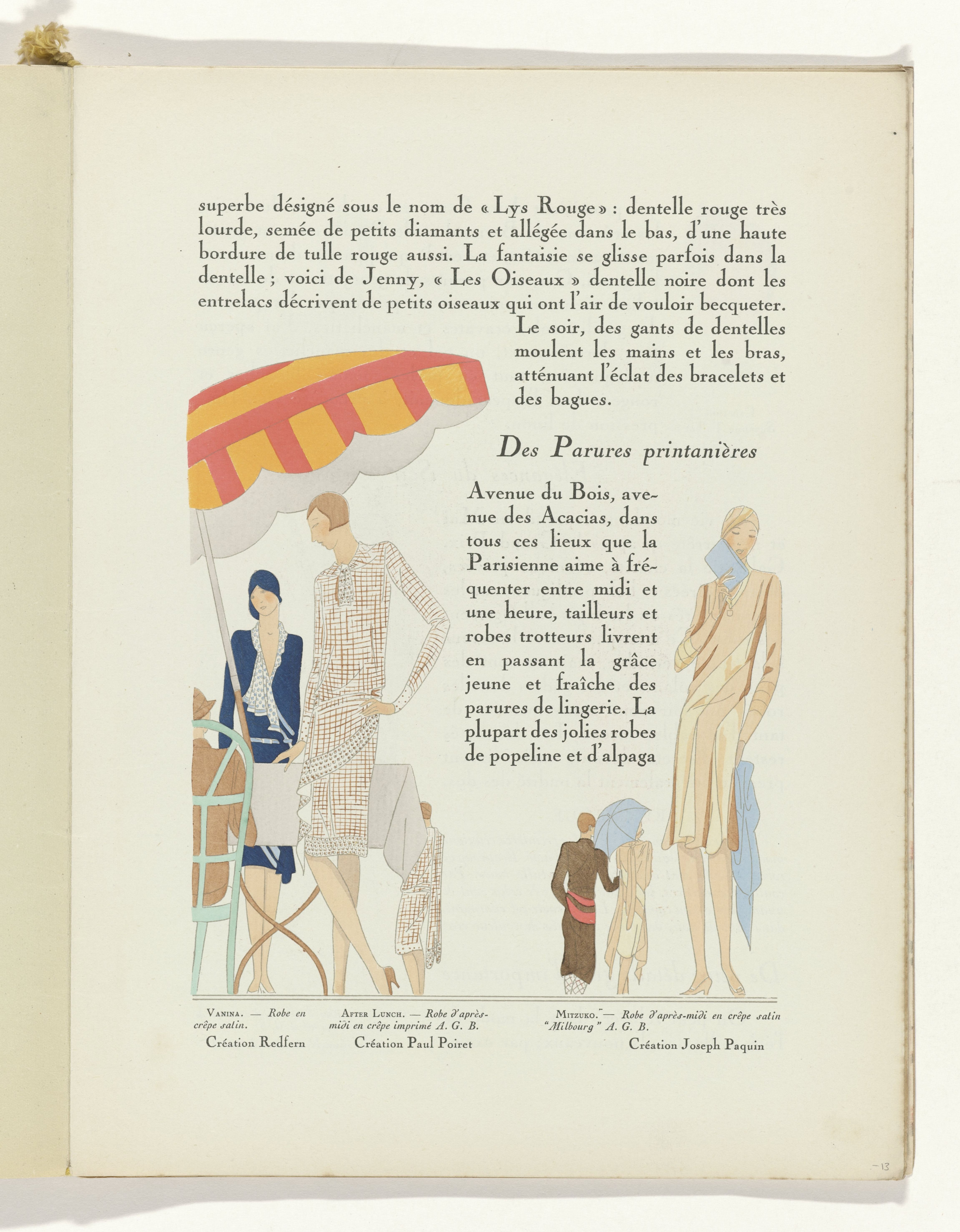
From the 1929 Redfern Paris Catalogue

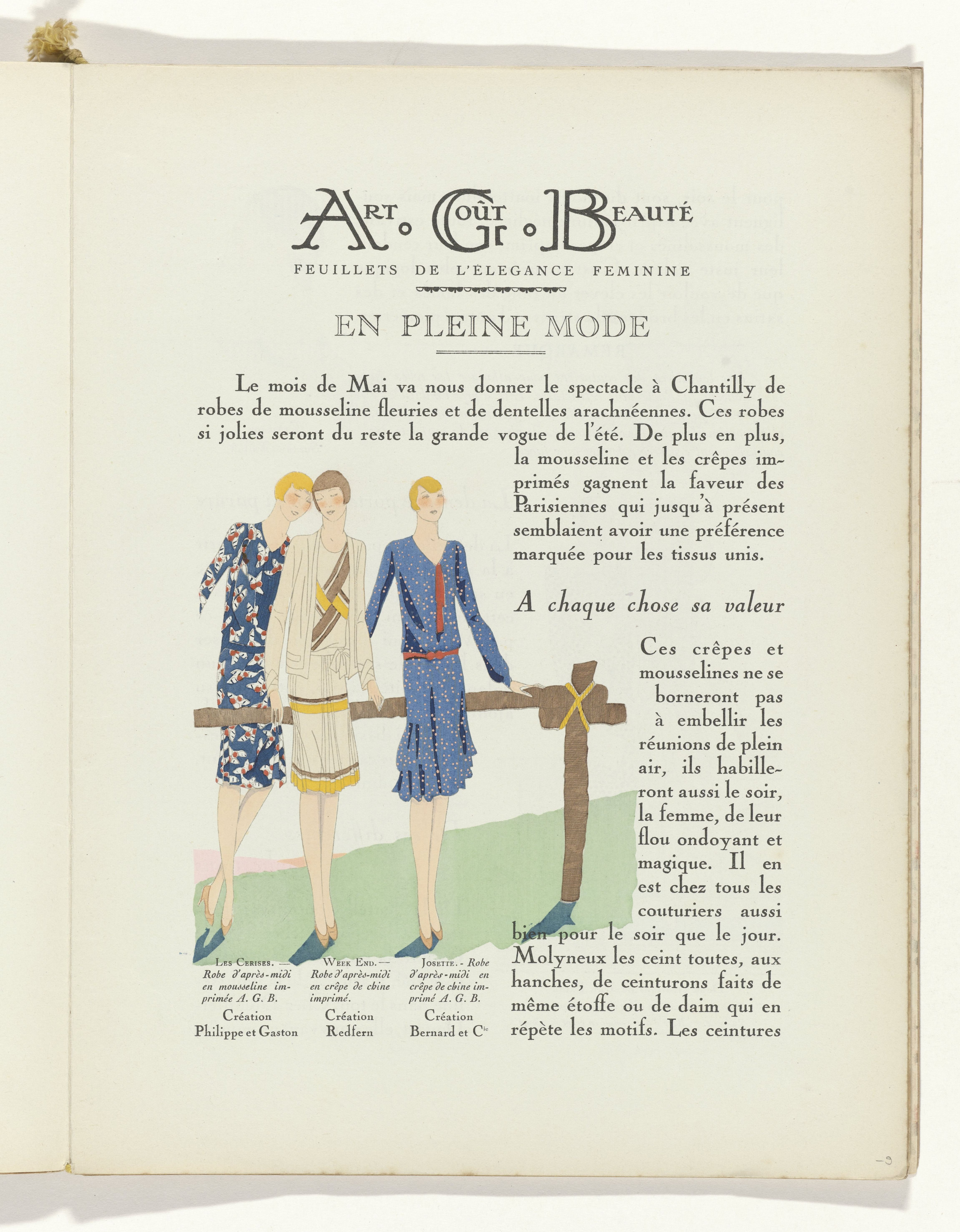
From the 1929 Redfern Paris Catalogue

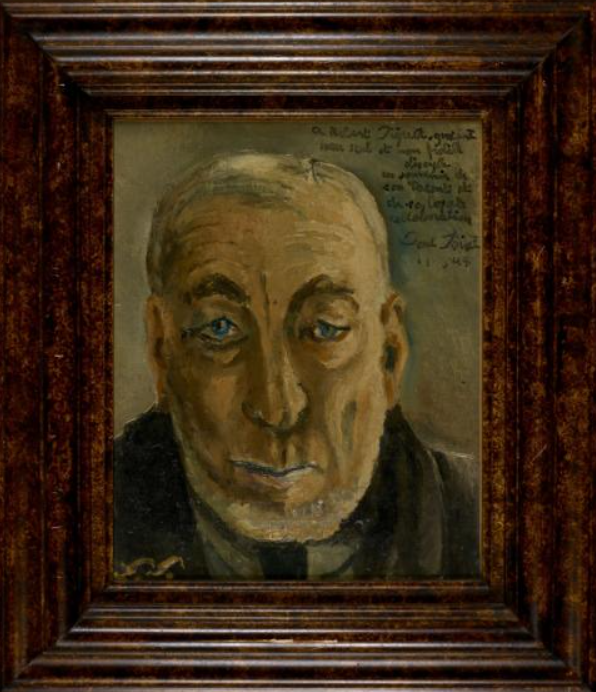
Paul Poiret's Self-Portrait, Inscribed to Piguet

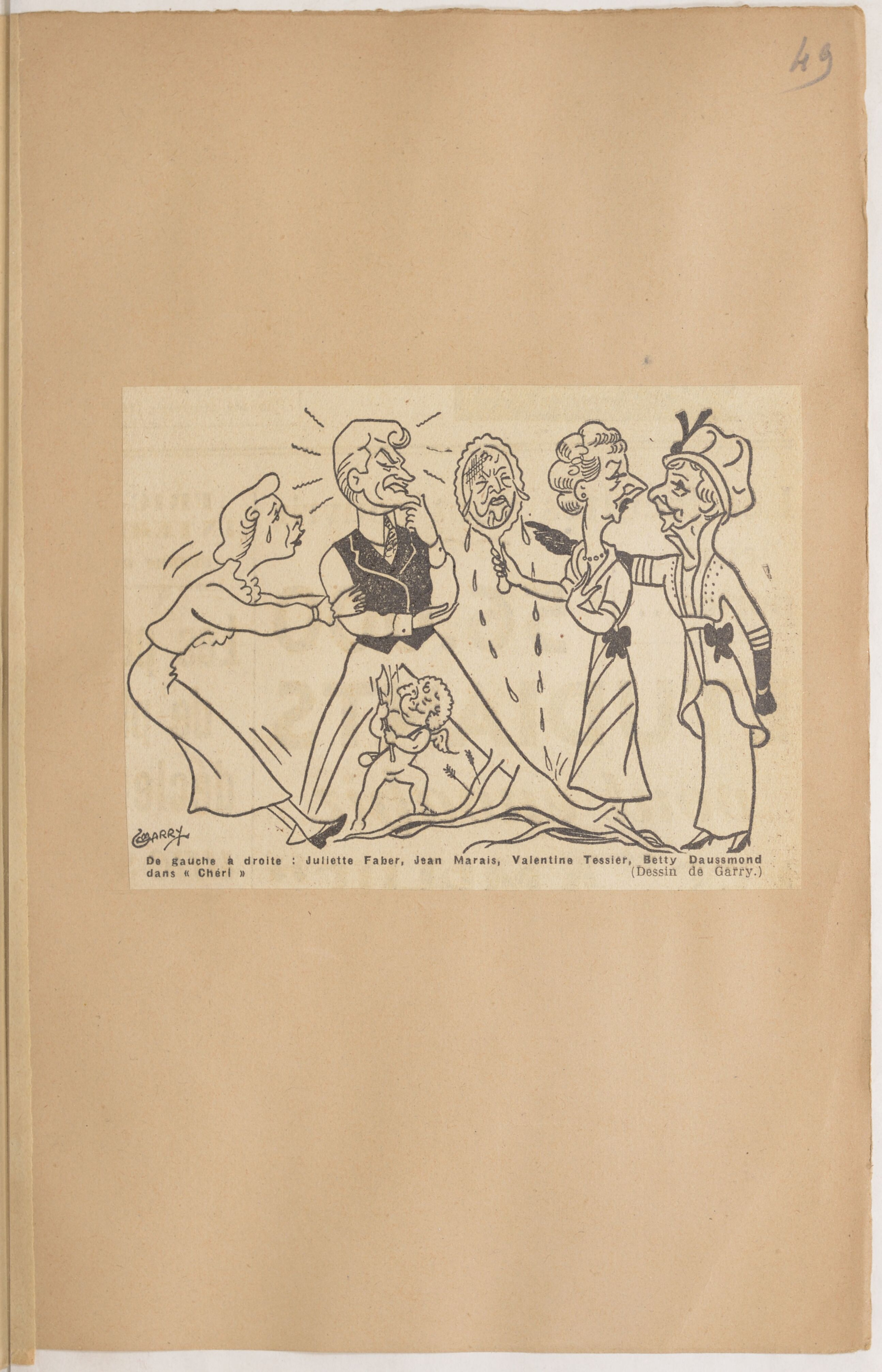
An Illustration of the Costumed Actors in Chéri

== Online links ==
- "Robert Piguet Parfums". - Official site for the current company
- "Robert Piguet at Fragrantica".
- "Interview with Joe Garces, creative director of Robert Piguet Parfums".
