= A11 autoroute =

Controlled-access highway from Paris to Nantes, France

A11 autoroute
- L'Océane

Route information
- Part of E50 E501 E60
- Maintained by Cofiroute and ASF
- Length: 323 km (201 mi)
- Existed: 1966–present

Major junctions
- East end: E5 / E50 / A 10 in Ponthévrard

- A 154 in Chartres; E502 / A 28 in Yvre-l'Eveque; E402 / A 28 in Saint-Saturnin; E50 / A 81 in La Chapelle-Saint-Aubin; E60 / A 85 in Corze; A 87 in Ecouflant; A 811 in Carquefou

- West end: E3 / E60 / A 844 in Nantes

Location
- Country: France

Highway system
- Roads in France; Autoroutes; Routes nationales

The A 11 autoroute is a motorway which connects Paris with Nantes via Le Mans and Angers. It is called L'Océane. The road is 323 kilometres (201 mi) long.

== Regions crossed ==
The following list indexes the sites worth visiting within 14 km of the road.

- Paris
- Chartres
- Le Mans
- Angers
- Nantes

== History ==
- 1972: Opening of the first section, La Folie Bessin - Thivars, is 68 km (A 10 and A 11).
- 1975: Opening of the section Chartres to La Ferté-Bernard.
- 1978: Opening of the section La Ferté-Bernard to Le Mans.
- 1981: Opening of the section Angers-Nantes.
- 2008: Opening of the Angers bypass

== List of exits and junctions ==
Region	Department	Junctions	Destinations	Notes
Île-de-France	Yvelines	A10 - A11	Paris, Évry, Versailles, Dourdan	Entry and exit from Paris
Île-de-France	Yvelines	1 : Ablis	Ablis, Rambouillet, Étampes	
Île-de-France	Yvelines	Aire de Gourville(Westbound); Aire des Chaudonnes (Eastbound)		
Centre-Val de Loire	Eure-et-Loir			
Centre-Val de Loire	Eure-et-Loir	Aire de Chartres-Gasville (Westbound); Aire de Chartres-Bois Paris (Eastbound)		
Centre-Val de Loire	Eure-et-Loir	2 : Chartres - est	Chartres - centre, Cathédrale Notre-Dame de Chartres	
Centre-Val de Loire	Eure-et-Loir	Aire de Ver-lès-Chartres - les Souchets (Westbound); Aire de Ver-lès-Chartres - les Moineaux (Eastbound)		
Centre-Val de Loire	Eure-et-Loir	3 : Chartres - Thivars	Chartres - centre, Châteaudun, Thivars, Cathédrale Notre-Dame de Chartres	
Centre-Val de Loire	Eure-et-Loir	Aire de La Poêle Percée (Westbound); Aire des Dix-Sept Setiers (Eastbound)		
Centre-Val de Loire	Eure-et-Loir	3.1 : Illiers-Combray	Illiers-Combray, Brou	
Centre-Val de Loire	Eure-et-Loir	Aire de La Charonnerie (Westbound); Aire de La Leu (Eastbound)		
Centre-Val de Loire	Eure-et-Loir	Aire des Manoirs du Perche (Westbound); Aire de Brou-Dampierre (Eastbound)		
Centre-Val de Loire	Eure-et-Loir	4 : Brou	Brou, Châteaudun, Nogent-le-Rotrou	
Centre-Val de Loire	Eure-et-Loir	Aire de Charmes (Westbound); Aire de La Petite Jardinière (Eastbound)		
Pays de la Loire	Sarthe	Aire de Théligny (Westbound); Aire de Montmirail (Eastbound)		
Pays de la Loire	Sarthe	5 : La Ferté-Bernard	La Ferté-Bernard, Mamers, Saint-Calais, Nogent-le-Rotrou	
Pays de la Loire	Sarthe	Aire de La Ferté-Bernard (Westbound); Aire de Villaines-la-Gonais (Eastbound)		
Pays de la Loire	Sarthe	6 : Connerré	Connerré, Bonnétable	
Pays de la Loire	Sarthe	Aire de Parnouette (Westbound); Aire de La Charpenterie (Eastbound)		
Pays de la Loire	Sarthe	Aire des Haras de Maulepaire (Westbound); Aire de La Martinière (Eastbound)		
Pays de la Loire	Sarthe	A28 (Southbound) - A11	Le Mans - centre, - Z. I. Sud, Tours, Bordeaux (A10), Orléans, Blois	
Pays de la Loire	Sarthe	Aires de La Sarthe-Sargé-Le Mans		
Pays de la Loire	Sarthe	7 : Le Mans - Z. I. Nord + A28 (Northbound) - A11	Le Mans, Sillé-le-Guillaume, Coulaines, Saint-Saturnin-sur-Loire	
Pays de la Loire	Sarthe	7 : Le Mans - Z. I. Nord + A28 (Northbound) - A11	Le Havre, Rouen (A13), Caen (A88), Alençon	
Pays de la Loire	Sarthe	A81 - A11	Rennes, Laval	
Pays de la Loire	Sarthe	E50 / A 11 becomes E501 / A 11		
Pays de la Loire	Sarthe	8 : Le Mans - centre / Université	Le Mans, Loué	
Pays de la Loire	Sarthe	Aires de Pruillé-le-Chétif		
Pays de la Loire	Sarthe	9 : Le Mans - sud	Le Mans - Z. I. Sud, Pontlieue, Allonnes, Tours	
Pays de la Loire	Sarthe	Aires de Pirmi		
Pays de la Loire	Sarthe	Aires de Parcé-sur-Sarthe		
Pays de la Loire	Sarthe	10 : Sablé - La Flèche	Sablé-sur-Sarthe, La Flèche, Centre Hospitalier de Sarthe et Loir	
Pays de la Loire	Maine-et-Loire	11 : Durtal	Durtal, Le Lion-d'Angers, La Flèche	
Pays de la Loire	Maine-et-Loire	Aires de La Chapelle-Saint-Laud		
Pays de la Loire	Maine-et-Loire	12 : Seiches-sur-le-Loir	Seiches-sur-le-Loir, Baugé, Blois	
Pays de la Loire	Maine-et-Loire	A85 - A11	Saumur, Tours, Lyon (A71)	
Pays de la Loire	Maine-et-Loire	E501 / A 11 becomes E60 / E501 / A 11		
Pays de la Loire	Maine-et-Loire	Aires de Bauné		
Pays de la Loire	Maine-et-Loire	13 : Pellouailles-les-Vignes	Tours, Le Mans, Saint-Sylvain-d'Anjou, Pellouailles-les-Vignes	
Pays de la Loire	Maine-et-Loire	Péage de Corzé		
Pays de la Loire	Maine-et-Loire	Aires des Portes d'Angers		
Pays de la Loire	Maine-et-Loire	14 : Gâtignolle + A87 - A11	Tiercé, Écouflant	
Pays de la Loire	Maine-et-Loire	14 : Gâtignolle + A87 - A11	Angers - est, Niort, La Roche-sur-Yon, Cholet, Poitiers, Saumur	
Pays de la Loire	Maine-et-Loire	15 : Angers - centre	Angers - C.H.U, M.I.N	Entry and exit from Paris
Pays de la Loire	Maine-et-Loire	E60 / E501 / A 11 becomes E60 / A 11		
Pays de la Loire	Maine-et-Loire	16 : Angers - nord	Angers, Avrillé - centre, Cantenay-Épinard, Terra Botanica, C.H.U, Tramway	
Pays de la Loire	Maine-et-Loire	17 : Angers - ouest	Rennes, Laval, Nantes, Montreuil-Juigné, Angers, Avrillé - Z. I., Beaucouzé	
Pays de la Loire	Maine-et-Loire	18 : Saint-Jean-de-Linières	Saint-Jean-de-Linières, Châteaubriant, Candé, Bouchemaine, Angers - centre, sud	
Pays de la Loire	Maine-et-Loire	Aire des Montilets (Westbound); Aire de Réveillon (Eastbound)		
Pays de la Loire	Maine-et-Loire	19 : Saint-Germain-des-Près	Chalonnes-sur-Loire, Saint-Germain-des-Prés, Beaupréau, Bécon-les-Granits	
Pays de la Loire	Loire-Atlantique	Aire de Varades - Pays de la Loire (Westbound); Aire de Varades - Pays d'Ancenis (Eastbound)		
Pays de la Loire	Loire-Atlantique	20 : Ancenis	Laval, Segré, Candé, Ancenis-Saint-Géréon	
Pays de la Loire	Loire-Atlantique	Péage d'Ancenis		
Pays de la Loire	Loire-Atlantique	Aire du Cellier (Westbound); Aire du Launay (Eastbound)		
Pays de la Loire	Loire-Atlantique	22 : Vieilleville	Périphérique Sud, Bordeaux (A83), Nantes - centre, Sainte-Luce-sur-Loire, Thouaré-sur-Loire, Carquefou - centre	
Pays de la Loire	Loire-Atlantique	23 : Boisbonne	Nantes - est, Carquefou - centre	
Pays de la Loire	Loire-Atlantique	24 : Gachet	Nantes - est, La Beaujoire	
Pays de la Loire	Loire-Atlantique	25 : La Bérangerais	La Chapelle-sur-Erdre	
Pays de la Loire	Loire-Atlantique	RN 844 (Périphérique Est de Nantes) - A11	Bordeaux (A83), Poitiers, Nantes - nord, centre	
Pays de la Loire	Loire-Atlantique	A844 (Périphérique Nord de Nantes) - A11	Rennes, Vannes (A82), Noirmoutier, Aéroport de Nantes-Atlantique	
E60 / A 11 becomes E60 / A 844
1.000 mi = 1.609 km; 1.000 km = 0.621 mi
