= A10 autoroute =

Autoroute between Paris and Bordeaux

A10 autoroute
- L’Aquitaine

Route information
- Part of E5 E50 E60 E606
- Maintained by DIR Île-de-France, Cofiroute, ASF
- Length: 557 km (346 mi)
- Existed: 1960–present

Major junctions
- North end: E5 / E15 / E50 / A 6a / A 6b / A 6 in Wissous (Paris)

- A 126 in Champlan; E50 / A 11 in Ponthevrard; E60 / A 19 in Artenay; E9 / A 71 in Orléans; E502 / A 28 in Tours; E60 / E604 / A 85 in Chambray-les-Tours; A 83 in Niort; E602 / A 837 in Saintes

- South end: E5 / E606 / A 630 / N 230 in Lormont (Bordeaux)

Location
- Country: France

Highway system
- Roads in France; Autoroutes; Routes nationales

The A10, also called L'Aquitaine, is an Autoroute in France, running for approximately 557 km (346 mi) from the A6 south of Paris to the A630 at Bordeaux. It is the longest motorway in France. It generally parallels the N10 Route Nationale, but deviates significantly from the older N10 between Paris and Tours and between Poitiers and Bordeaux. The closest Routes Nationale to those sections are the N20 from Paris to Orléans, the N152 from Orléans to Tours, the N11 from Poitiers to Niort, the N150 from Niort to Saintes, and the N137 from Saintes to Bordeaux.

All of the A10 is part of the E-road E05; it is also part of the E50 north of the A11 split near Chartres and the E60 between the junction with A19 at Artenay near Orléans and the junction with A85 at Chambray-lès-Tours near Tours. Most of the A10 is a toll road, but it is free north of the N104, near Paris, between exits 20 and 22 in Tours, and south of the N10 (exit 39), near Bordeaux.

== List of junctions ==
Region	Department	Junction	Destinations	Notes
Île-de-France	Hauts-de-Seine	A6a - A6b - A10	Villejuif, Paris, Arcueil	Entry and exit from Paris
Île-de-France	Hauts-de-Seine	A6a - A6b - A10	A86, Lille (A1), Rungis, Orly	Entry and exit from Paris
Île-de-France	Essonne	4 : Massy	Massy, Longjumeau, Antony - Z. A.	no northbound exit, RN 20 joins southbound
Île-de-France	Essonne	5: Les Champarts (RN 20)	Étampes, Orléans, Longjumeau, La Ville-du-Bois, Saulx-les-Chartreux	no southbound entrance, RN 20 leaves southbound
Île-de-France	Essonne	A126 - A10	Évry, Lyon (A6), Chilly-Mazarin	
Île-de-France	Essonne	6 : Palaiseau	Palaiseau, Antony, Massy, Villebon-sur-Yvette	
Île-de-France	Essonne	7 : Igny	Versailles, Saint-Quentin-en-Yvelines, Igny, Bièvres, Cité Scientifique	Entry and exit from Paris
Île-de-France	Essonne	Gare de Massy -T.G.V	Gare de Massy-Palaiseau	Entry and exit from Bordeaux
Île-de-France	Essonne	8 : Bretelle de Chevreuse	Orsay, Bures	Entry and exit from Paris
Île-de-France	Essonne	9 : Courtabœuf - sud	Villebon-sur-Yvette, Z. A. de Courtabœuf	Entry and exit from Bordeaux
Île-de-France	Essonne	9 : Courtabœuf - est	Chartres, Les Ulis, Orsay, Z. A. de Courtabœuf	Entry and exit from Paris
Île-de-France	Essonne	RN 118 - A10	Rouen (A13), Les Ulis, Versailles (A86), Boulogne-Billancourt, Paris - Porte de Saint-Cloud, Z. A. de Courtabœuf - Autres Secteurs	Entry and exit from Bordeaux
Île-de-France	Essonne	RN 104 - A10	Lyon (A6), Metz-Nancy (A4), Évry, Orléans, Linas-Montlhéry, Arpajon, Marcoussis	
Île-de-France	Essonne	Aire de Limours-Janvry (Southbound); Aire de Limours-Briis-sous-Forges (Northbound)		
Île-de-France	Yvelines	10 : Dourdan	Dourdan, Limours, Saint-Arnoult-en-Yvelines	
Île-de-France	Yvelines	Péage de Saint-Arnoult		
Île-de-France	Yvelines	A11 - A10	Chartres, Le Mans, Rennes, Laval (A81)	Entry and exit from Paris
Île-de-France	Yvelines	E5 / E50 / A 10 becomes E5 / A 10		
Île-de-France	Yvelines	11 : Allainville	Étampes, Rambouillet, Allainville	
Centre-Val de Loire	Eure-et-Loir			
Centre-Val de Loire	Eure-et-Loir	Aire de Boutroux (Southbound); Aire de Marnières (Northbound)		
Centre-Val de Loire	Eure-et-Loir	Aire des Plaines de Beauce (Southbound); Aire de Val-Neuvy (Northbound)		
Centre-Val de Loire	Eure-et-Loir	12 : Janville	Chartres, Janville-en-Beauce, Châteaudun	
Centre-Val de Loire	Eure-et-Loir	Aire du Héron Cendré (Southbound); Aire de La Dauneuse (Northbound)		
Centre-Val de Loire	Loiret	13 : Artenay	Artenay	
Centre-Val de Loire	Loiret	A19 - A10	Montargis, Dijon (A6), Metz-Nancy (A5)	
Centre-Val de Loire	Loiret	E5 / A 10 becomes E5 / E60 / A 10		
Centre-Val de Loire	Loiret	Aire d'Orléans-Saran (Southbound); Aire d'Orléans-Gidy (Northbound)		
Centre-Val de Loire	Loiret	13.1 : Gidy	Gidy, Pôle 45	
Centre-Val de Loire	Loiret	14 : Orléans - nord	Orléans, Le Mans, Saran, Fleury-les-Aubrais	
Centre-Val de Loire	Loiret	A71 - A10	Orléans - centre, La Source, Vierzon, Clermont-Ferrand, Toulouse (A20)	
Centre-Val de Loire	Loiret	Aire de Bellevue (Southbound); Aire de Chauvry (Northbound)		
Centre-Val de Loire	Loiret	15 : Meung-sur-Loire	Meung-sur-Loire, Beaugency	
Centre-Val de Loire	Loiret	Aire de Meung-sur-Loire (Southbound); Aire de Beaugency-Messas (Northbound)		
Centre-Val de Loire	Loir-et-Cher	Aire des Fougères (Southbound); Aire de Brusolle (Northbound)		
Centre-Val de Loire	Loir-et-Cher	16 : Mer	Château de Chambord, Mer, Chambord, Beaugency	
Centre-Val de Loire	Loir-et-Cher	Aire de Blois-Villerbon (Southbound); Aire de Blois-Ménars (Northbound)		
Centre-Val de Loire	Loir-et-Cher	17 : Blois	Blois, Vendôme, La Chaussée-Saint-Victor	
Centre-Val de Loire	Loir-et-Cher	Aire La Chatière (Southbound); Aire des Bruères (Northbound)		
Centre-Val de Loire	Indre-et-Loire	18 : Château-Renault - Ambroise	Château-Renault, Amboise, Chartres	
Centre-Val de Loire	Indre-et-Loire	Aire de La Courte Épée (Southbound); Aire de La Picardière(Northbound)		
Centre-Val de Loire	Indre-et-Loire	Péage de Monnaie		
Centre-Val de Loire	Indre-et-Loire	Aire de Tours-La Longue Vue (Southbound); Aire de Tours-Val de Loire (Northbound)		
Centre-Val de Loire	Indre-et-Loire	A28 - A10	Le Mans, Rouen (A13)	
Centre-Val de Loire	Indre-et-Loire	19 : Tours - nord	Tours, Z. A. Parçay-Meslay Tours Nord	
Centre-Val de Loire	Indre-et-Loire	20 : Vouvray	Tours - nord, Sainte-Radegonde, Vouvray, Montlouis-sur-Loire, Aéroport de Tours-Val de Loire	
Centre-Val de Loire	Indre-et-Loire	21 : Tours - centre	Tours, Saint-Pierre-des-Corps, Amboise, Montlouis-sur-Loire	
Centre-Val de Loire	Indre-et-Loire	22 : Saint-Avertin	Tours - sud, Saint-Avertin	Entry and exit from Paris
Centre-Val de Loire	Indre-et-Loire	23 : Chambray-lès-Tours	Chambray-lès-Tours, Montbazon, Tours - sud, Saint-Avertin	
Centre-Val de Loire	Indre-et-Loire	24 : Joué-lès-Tours	Chambray-lès-Tours, Joué-lès-Tours, Chinon, Loches	
Centre-Val de Loire	Indre-et-Loire	A85 - A10	Angers, Saumur, Vierzon, Nantes (A11), Châteauroux, Bourges (A71), Lyon	
Centre-Val de Loire	Indre-et-Loire	E5 / E60 / A 10 becomes again E5 / A 10		
Centre-Val de Loire	Indre-et-Loire	Aire du Village Brûlé (Southbound); Aire du Moulin Rouge (Northbound)		
Centre-Val de Loire	Indre-et-Loire	24.1 : Monts-Sorigny	Monts, Sorigny, Montbazon, Z.A Isoparc	
Centre-Val de Loire	Indre-et-Loire	Péage de Sorigny		
Centre-Val de Loire	Indre-et-Loire	Aire de Sainte-Maure-de-Touraine (Southbound); Aire de La Fontaine Colette (Northbound)		
Centre-Val de Loire	Indre-et-Loire	25 : Sainte-Maure	Sainte-Maure-de-Touraine, Chinon, Loches	
Centre-Val de Loire	Indre-et-Loire	Aire de Maillé (Southbound); Aire de Nouâtre (Northbound)		
Nouvelle-Aquitaine	Vienne	Aire de Châtellerault-Antran (Southbound); Aire de Châtellerault-Usseau (Northbound)		
Nouvelle-Aquitaine	Vienne	26 : Châtellerault - nord	Châtellerault - centre, La Roche-Posay	
Nouvelle-Aquitaine	Vienne	Aire des Meuniers (Southbound); Aire des Chagnats (Northbound)		
Nouvelle-Aquitaine	Vienne	27 : Châtellerault - sud	Châtellerault - centre, Naintré	
Nouvelle-Aquitaine	Vienne	Aire de Poitiers-Jaunay-Clan (Southbound); Aire de Poitiers-Chincé (Northbound)		
Nouvelle-Aquitaine	Vienne	28 : Futuroscope	Jaunay-Clan, Chasseneuil-du-Poitou	
Nouvelle-Aquitaine	Vienne	29 : Poitiers - nord	Limoges, Poitiers - centre, Parthenay, Angers, Saumur	
Nouvelle-Aquitaine	Vienne	Aire des Cent Septiers (Southbound); Aire des Quatre Vents (Northbound)		
Nouvelle-Aquitaine	Vienne	30 : Poitiers - sud	Poitiers - centre, Lusignan, Vivonne, Angoulême	
Nouvelle-Aquitaine	Vienne	Aire de Coulombiers		
Nouvelle-Aquitaine	Vienne	Aire de Rouillé-Pamproux		
Nouvelle-Aquitaine	Deux-Sèvres	31 : Saint-Maixent - Soudan	Saint-Maixent-l'École, Soudan, Lusignan	
Nouvelle-Aquitaine	Deux-Sèvres	Aire de Sainte-Eanne		
Nouvelle-Aquitaine	Deux-Sèvres	Aire de Sainte-Néomaye		
Nouvelle-Aquitaine	Deux-Sèvres	A83 - A10	Nantes, Angers (A87), La Roche-sur-Yon, Niort - centre, Saint-Maixent-l'École	
Nouvelle-Aquitaine	Deux-Sèvres	32 : Vouillé	Niort - est, centre, Limoges, Angoulême, Melle, Marais Poitevin	
Nouvelle-Aquitaine	Deux-Sèvres	E5 / A 10 becomes E5 / E601 / A 10		
Nouvelle-Aquitaine	Deux-Sèvres	Aire de Poitou-Charentes		
Nouvelle-Aquitaine	Deux-Sèvres	33 : La Rochelle - Niort-sud	Niort, La Rochelle, Rochefort, Surgères, Marais Poitevin	
Nouvelle-Aquitaine	Deux-Sèvres	E5 / E601 / A 10 becomes again E5 / A 10		
Nouvelle-Aquitaine	Deux-Sèvres	Aire de Dœuil-sur-le-Mignon		
Nouvelle-Aquitaine	Charente-Maritime	Aire de Lozay (Southbound); Aire de La Benâte (Northbound)		
Nouvelle-Aquitaine	Charente-Maritime	34 : Saint-Jean-d'Angély	Cognac, Surgères, Aulnay, Saint-Jean-d'Angély	
Nouvelle-Aquitaine	Charente-Maritime	Aire de Fenioux		
Nouvelle-Aquitaine	Charente-Maritime	Aire de Port-d'Envaux		
Nouvelle-Aquitaine	Charente-Maritime	A837 - A10	La Rochelle, Rochefort	Entry and exit from Bordeaux
Nouvelle-Aquitaine	Charente-Maritime	35 : Saintes	Angoulême, Ile d'Oléron, Royan, Saintes	
Nouvelle-Aquitaine	Charente-Maritime	Aire de Chermignac		
Nouvelle-Aquitaine	Charente-Maritime	Aire de Saint-Léger		
Nouvelle-Aquitaine	Charente-Maritime	36 : Pons	Jonzac, Cognac, Pons	
Nouvelle-Aquitaine	Charente-Maritime	Aire de Saint-Palais		
Nouvelle-Aquitaine	Charente-Maritime	Aire de Saint-Ciers		
Nouvelle-Aquitaine	Charente-Maritime	37 : Mirabeau	Montendre, Royan, Jonzac, Mirambeau	
Nouvelle-Aquitaine	Charente-Maritime	Aire de Saint-Caprais (Southbound); Aire de Boisredon (Northbound)		
Nouvelle-Aquitaine	Gironde	38 : Saint-Aubin-de-Blaye	Montendre, Saint-Aubin-de-Blaye, Saint-Ciers-sur-Gironde	
Nouvelle-Aquitaine	Gironde	Aire de Saugon (Southbound); Aire des Terres de l'Estuaire (Northbound)		
Nouvelle-Aquitaine	Gironde	Aire de Saint-Christoly (Southbound); Aire de Cézac (Northbound)		
Nouvelle-Aquitaine	Gironde	Péage de Virsac		
Nouvelle-Aquitaine	Gironde	39a : Saint-Antoine - Libourne	Libourne, Saint-André-de-Cubzac	
Nouvelle-Aquitaine	Gironde	39b : Barbezieux	Angoulême, Barbezieux	Entry and exit from Bordeaux
Nouvelle-Aquitaine	Gironde	E5 / A 10 becomes E5 / E606 / A 10		
Nouvelle-Aquitaine	Gironde	40a : Blaye	Royan, Saintes, Blaye	Entry and exit from Bordeaux
Nouvelle-Aquitaine	Gironde	40b : Saint-André-de-Cubzac	Libourne, Saint-André-de-Cubzac, Bourg	Entry and exit from Bordeaux
Nouvelle-Aquitaine	Gironde	Aire de L'Estalot (Southbound); Aire de Meillac (Northbound)		
Nouvelle-Aquitaine	Gironde	41 : Ambès	Ambès, Saint-Vincent-de-Paul, Z. I. Bassens, Zone portuaire	
Nouvelle-Aquitaine	Gironde	42 : Ambarès - Saint-Loubès	Ambarès-et-Lagrave, Saint-Loubès	
Nouvelle-Aquitaine	Gironde	43 : Sainte-Eulalie	Sainte-Eulalie, Ambarès-et-Lagrave	
Nouvelle-Aquitaine	Gironde	44 : Carbon-Blanc	Carbon-Blanc, Bassens	Exit from Paris
Nouvelle-Aquitaine	Gironde	45 : Lormont	Lormont	Entry and exit from Paris
Nouvelle-Aquitaine	Gironde	A630 & RN 230 - A10	Rocade Extérieur : Mérignac	
Nouvelle-Aquitaine	Gironde	A630 & RN 230 - A10	Rocade Intérieur : Toulouse (A62), Bayonne, Bassin d'Arcachon (A63), Bordeaux, Périgueux (A89)	
1.000 mi = 1.609 km; 1.000 km = 0.621 mi
