= A28 autoroute =

Road in France

A28 autoroute

Route information
- Part of E402 E44 E502
- Maintained by DIR Nord-Ouest; SANEF Paris Normandie; Cofiroute
- Length: 405 km (252 mi)
- Existed: 2005–present

Major junctions
- North end: Abbeville
- E402 / A 16 in Abbeville; E44 / A 29 in Neufchâtel-en-Bray and Saint-Saëns; E5 / E46 / E402 / A 13 in Bourg-Achard; A 88 in Sées; E50 / A 11 in Saint-Saturnin and Yvré-l'Évêque

- South end: E5 / A 10 in Tours

Location
- Country: France

Highway system
- Roads in France; Autoroutes; Routes nationales

The Autoroute A28 is a French mainland motorway linking Abbeville in the Somme to Tours in Indre-et-Loire. The motorway starts at Abbeville, splitting from the A16 and, after merging with the A13 near Rouen, ends at Tours, merging with the A10. It is 405 km long. The motorway between Rouen and Tours was added to the Schéma Directeur Routier National in 1987.

Between Abbeville and Rouen, the first part, the motorway was built by the Ministry of Public Works and Transport. This portion of the motorway, 97 km long, is toll-free.

Between Rouen and Alençon, the second part, the motorway is operated by Alis (partly owned by Sanef) and is the first autoroute of France to have had offers by European companies following the withdrawal of the SAPN in 1998 despite its contract initiated in 1995. The second stretch of road, opened on 27 October 2005, is 125 km long and passes over two large viaducts; the Viaduc de la Risle and the Viaduc du Bec.

The third and final stretch of road, between Alençon and the A10 near Tours, is operated by Cofiroute. A portion of road between Écommoy and Tours was prevented from being built due to the presence of a protected species of beetle, Osmoderma Eremita, or the Pique Prune. Construction began only in 2004, and the stretch was opened on 14 December.

== List of exits and junctions ==
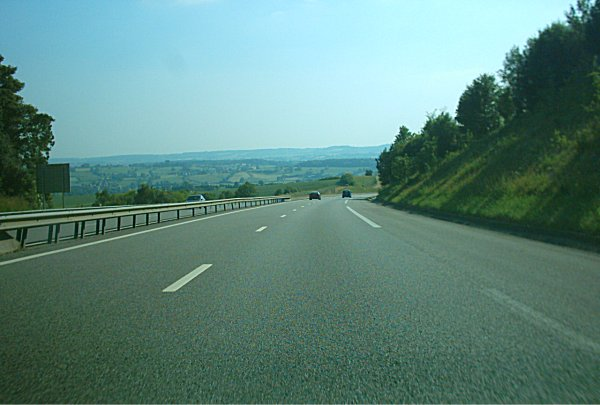
The A28 near Neufchâtel-en-Bray.

Region	Department	Junction	Destinations	Notes
Hauts-de-France	Somme	A16 - A28	Amiens, Paris, Berck, Boulogne-sur-Mer, Calais	
Hauts-de-France	Somme	1 : Baie de Somme	Cayeux-sur-Mer, Saint-Valery-sur-Somme, Le Crotoy, Abbeville - Menchecourt	
Hauts-de-France	Somme	2 : Val de Somme	Le Tréport, Friville-Escarbotin, Abbeville - Mautort	
Hauts-de-France	Somme	3 : Monts Caubert	Mareuil-Caubert, Moyenneville, Abbeville - Gare	
Hauts-de-France	Somme	Aire de Béhen		
Hauts-de-France	Somme	4 : Le Vimeu	Saint-Maxent, Martainneville, Tours-en-Vimeu, Oisemont, Friville-Escarbotin	
Hauts-de-France	Somme	Aire de Translay		
Normandie	Seine-Maritime	5 : Vallée de la Bresle	Eu - Le Tréport, Beauvais, Blangy-sur-Bresle - Z. I, Aumale, Gamaches	
Normandie	Seine-Maritime	6 : L'Yère et la Haute Belloy	Londinières, Foucarmont	
Normandie	Seine-Maritime	Aire du Bois du Coudroy		
Normandie	Seine-Maritime	7 : Le Plateau de la Mare	Neufchâtel-en-Bray-Nord	Entry and exit from Abbeville
Normandie	Seine-Maritime	A29 - A28	Amiens, Reims, Lille	
Normandie	Seine-Maritime	E402 / A 28 overlaps and becomes E402 / A 28 / E44 / A 29		
Normandie	Seine-Maritime	8 : Portes du Pays de Bray	Amiens, Neufchâtel-en-Bray - nord	Entry and exit from Rouen
Normandie	Seine-Maritime	9 : Le Four Rouge	Neufchâtel-en-Bray - sud, Neufchâtel-en-Bray - centre	
Normandie	Seine-Maritime	10 : Les Hayons	Dieppe, Forges-les-Eaux, Saint-Saëns	
Normandie	Seine-Maritime	Aire de Maucomble (Southbound); Aire de Bosc-Mesnil (Northbound)		
Normandie	Seine-Maritime	11 : Saint-Saëns - Le Pucheuil	Le Havre, Fécamp, Tôtes, Saint-Saëns	
Normandie	Seine-Maritime	A29 - A28	Le Havre, Caen	
Normandie	Seine-Maritime	12 : Le Moulin d'Ecalles	Buchy, Montville, Forges-les-Eaux	
Normandie	Seine-Maritime	Aire de Quincampoix		
Normandie	E402 / A 28 becomes E402 / N 28 and continued as N28, N338, N138 and A13 for 23 miles/38 kilometres			
Normandie	Eure	A13 - A28	Paris, Rouen, Calais, Nantes, Caen, Lisieux, Le Havre, Fécamp	
Normandie	Eure	13 : Brionne	Elbeuf, Bourgtheroulde, Le Neubourg, Brionne	
Normandie	Eure	13 : Brionne	Aire du domaine d'Harcourt	
Normandie	Eure	14 : Bernay	Évreux, Lisieux, Le Havre, Pont-Audemer, Brionne, Bernay	
Normandie	Eure	14 : Bernay	Aire de Risle et Charentonne	
Normandie	Eure	15 : Orbec	L'Aigle, Orbec, Broglie	
Normandie	Orne	Aire des Haras		
Normandie	Orne	16 : Gacé	Lisieux, L'Aigle, Vimoutiers, Gacé	
Normandie	Orne	Aire des Sources de l'Orne		
Normandie	Orne	A88 - A28	Caen, Flers, Argentan, Mortagne-au-Perche, Sées - nord, Falaise	
Normandie	Orne	17 : Sées	Sées - sud	
Normandie	Orne	18 : Alençon - nord	Saint-Malo, Dreux, Alençon - centre, Mortagne-au-Perche, Pré-en-Pail	
Normandie	Orne	18 : Alençon - nord	Aire de la Dentelle d'Alençon	
Pays de la Loire	Sarthe	19 : Alencon - sud	Le Mans, Alençon - centre, Arçonnay, Mamers	
Pays de la Loire	Sarthe	20 : Mamers	Sillé-le-Guillaume, Mamers, Fresnay-sur-Sarthe	
Pays de la Loire	Sarthe	Aire de Joël Boisgard (Southbound); Aire de La Suzannerie (Northbound)		
Pays de la Loire	Sarthe	21 : Beaumont-sur-Sarthe	Ballon, Beaumont-sur-Sarthe	
Pays de la Loire	Sarthe	A11 - A28 + 22 : Le Mans Z. I. Nord	Rennes (A81), Nantes, Le Mans - Université	
Pays de la Loire	Sarthe	A11 - A28 + 22 : Le Mans Z. I. Nord	Le Mans - centre, Sillé-le-Guillaume, Coulaines, Le Mans - Z. I. Nord	
Pays de la Loire	Sarthe	E402 / A 28 becomes E50 / A 11 / A 28 Road is continued as A11 Northbound for 5 miles/9 kilometres		
Pays de la Loire	Sarthe	E50 / A 11 / A 28 becomes again E502 / A 28		
Pays de la Loire	Sarthe	23: Le Mans - Z. I. Sud	Orléans, Blois, Le Mans - centre, Saint-Calais, Le Mans - Z. I. Sud	
Pays de la Loire	Sarthe	24 : Parigne-l'Eveque	Parigne-l'Eveque	
Pays de la Loire	Sarthe	Aire des Perrières (Southbound); Aire de Croiselles (Northbound)		
Pays de la Loire	Sarthe	25 : Écommoy	Écommoy	
Pays de la Loire	Sarthe	26 : Montabon	Château-du-Loir, Le Lude	
Pays de la Loire	Sarthe	Aire de Sarthe-Touraine		
Centre-Val de Loire	Indre-et-Loire	Péage de Saint-Christophe		
Centre-Val de Loire	Indre-et-Loire	27 : Neuillé-Pont-Pierre	Chateau-Renault, Neuillé-Pont-Pierre	
Centre-Val de Loire	Indre-et-Loire	Aire de Chantemerle (Southbound); Aire de Chenardière (Northbound)		
Centre-Val de Loire	Indre-et-Loire	A10 - A28	Orléans, Blois, Tours, Poitiers, Bordeaux, Vierzon	
1.000 mi = 1.609 km; 1.000 km = 0.621 mi

== Village étape ==
The Autoroute is served by the following Village étape, Neufchâtel-en-Bray.
