= A29 autoroute =

Road in France

A29 autoroute

Route information
- Part of E44
- Maintained by SANEF Paris Normandie; CCI Seine Estuaire; SANEF
- Length: 264 km (164 mi)
- Existed: 1994–present

Major junctions
- West end: E46 / A 13 in Beuzeville

- E5 / A 131 in Rogerville; A 150 in Yvetot; A 151 in Beautot; E402 / A 28 in Saint-Saëns and Ménonval; E44 / A 16 in Salouël and Vers-sur-Selle; E15 / E19 / A 1 in Ablaincourt-Pressoir

- East end: E17 / E44 / A 26 in Francilly-Selency near Saint-Quentin

Location
- Country: France

Highway system
- Roads in France; Autoroutes; Routes nationales

The A 29 is a major toll motorway in Normandy and Picardy, northwestern and northern France. The road is also part of European route E44. From its western interchange with the A28 autoroute until its junction with the A26 autoroute, part of the A29 also forms the northern section of the Grand contournement de Paris.

== Route ==
The road connects the port of Le Havre with the A 26 at Saint-Quentin. It also has junctions with the A 13, A 131, A 16, A 28, and A 1 autoroutes.

== Junctions ==
Region	Department	Junction	Destinations	Notes
Normandie	Calvados	A13 - A29	Paris, Rouen, Nantes, Caen, Lisieux	
Normandie	Calvados	Péage de Quetteville		
Normandie	Calvados	1 : Gonneville-sur-Honfleur	Deauville-Normandie	Entry and exit from A13
Normandie	Calvados	2 : Deauville - Trouville	Deauville-Trouville, Deauville-Normandie, Z. A. du Plateau	Entry and exit from Saint-Quentin
Normandie	Calvados	3 : Honfleur	Le Mans, Honfleur, Pont-Audemer	
Normandie	Seine-Maritime			
Normandie	Seine-Maritime	E44 / A 29 becomes E44 / N 1029		
Normandie	Seine-Maritime	Péage du Pont de Normandie		
Normandie	Seine-Maritime	4 : Port 1000-3000	Port 1000-3000	
Normandie	Seine-Maritime	4 : Port 1000-3000	Aire de la Baie de Seine	
Normandie	Seine-Maritime	E44 / N 1029 becomes again E44 / A 29		
Normandie	Seine-Maritime	5 : Port 4000-6000	Port 4000-6000, Centre Routier	
Normandie	Seine-Maritime	A131 - A29	Pont de Tancarville, Paris, Rouen - sud (A13), Le Havre - centre, Car Ferries, Port 3000-4000	
Normandie	Seine-Maritime	6 : Saint-Romain-de-Colbosc	Saint-Romain-de-Colbosc, Étretat, Montivilliers, Le Havre - Ville-Haute	
Normandie	Seine-Maritime	Péage de Saint-Romain-de-Colbosc		
Normandie	Seine-Maritime	7 : Bolbec	Fécamp, Bolbec, Lillebonne, Étretat, Pont de Tancarville	
Normandie	Seine-Maritime	Aire de Bolleville		
Normandie	Seine-Maritime	8 : Fécamp	Fécamp, Yvetot, Cany-Barville, Pont de Brotonne	
Normandie	Seine-Maritime	Aire d'Écretteville-lès-Baons		
Normandie	Seine-Maritime	A150 - A29	Rouen - nord, Barentin, Pavilly, Yvetot	Entry and exit from A13
Normandie	Seine-Maritime	9 : Yerville	Yvetot, Cany-Barville, Saint-Valery-en-Caux	
Normandie	Seine-Maritime	Aire de Saint-Martin-aux-Arbres		
Normandie	Seine-Maritime	A151 - A29	Rouen - nord (A150), Dieppe	
Normandie	Seine-Maritime	Péage de Cottevrard		
Normandie	Seine-Maritime	10 : Saint-Saëns	Saint-Saëns	Entry and exit from A13
Normandie	Seine-Maritime	A28 - A29	Rouen	
Normandie	Seine-Maritime	E44 / A 29 overlaps and becomes E44 / E402 / A 28 / A 29		
Normandie	Seine-Maritime	E44 / E402 / A 28 / A 29 becomes again E44 / A 29		
Normandie	Seine-Maritime	A28 - A29	Calais (A16), Boulogne-sur-Mer, Abbeville	
Normandie	Seine-Maritime	11 : Neufchâtel-en-Bray - nord	Neufchâtel-en-Bray, Mortemer	Entry and exit from Saint-Quentin
Normandie	Seine-Maritime	12 : Aumale	Eu-Le Tréport, Aumale, Formerie, Blangy-sur-Bresle, Grandvilliers	Entry and exit from A13
Normandie	Seine-Maritime	Péage d'Aumale		
Normandie	Seine-Maritime	Aire du Moulin de Pierre (Eastbound); Aire de la Mare du Bois (Westbound)		
Hauts-de-France	Somme	13 : Poix-de-Picardie	Poix-de-Picardie, Grandvilliers, Airaines	
Hauts-de-France	Somme	13 : Poix-de-Picardie	Aire de Croixrault	
Hauts-de-France	Somme	A16 - A29	Calais, Abbeville, Amiens - centre, Amiens - ouest, Amiens - nord	
Hauts-de-France	Somme	E44 / A 29 overlaps and becomes E44 / A 29 / A 16		
Hauts-de-France	Somme	E44 / A 29 / A 16 becomes again E44 / A 29		
Hauts-de-France	Somme	A16 - A29	Beauvais, Cergy-Pontoise, Paris - ouest	
Hauts-de-France	Somme	Péage de Dury		
Hauts-de-France	Somme	31 : Amiens-sud	Amiens - centre, Dury, Centre Commercial, RD 1001	
Hauts-de-France	Somme	32 : Amiens -Henriville	Amiens, Saint-Fuscien, Ailly-sur-Noye	
Hauts-de-France	Somme	33 : Cagny	Cagny, Boves	
Hauts-de-France	Somme	RN 25 - A29	Longueau, Amiens - nord, Saint-Quentin (RD 1029)	
Hauts-de-France	Somme	51 : Pôle Jules Verne	Roye, Longueau, Boves	
Hauts-de-France	Somme	Péage de Jules Verne		
Hauts-de-France	Somme	52 : Villers-Bretonneux	Corbie, Villers-Bretonneux, Moreuil	
Hauts-de-France	Somme	52 : Villers-Bretonneux	Aire de Villers-Bretonneux	
Hauts-de-France	Somme	A1 - A29 + 53 : Gare T.G.V	Lille, Calais (A26), Bruxelles (A2), Péronne, Paris - centre	
Hauts-de-France	Somme	A1 - A29 + 53 : Gare T.G.V	Gare TGV Haute-Picardie	
Hauts-de-France	Somme	54 : Athies	Athies, Ham, Péronne	
Hauts-de-France	Somme	54 : Athies	Aire d'Athies	
Hauts-de-France	Aisne	A26 - A29	Calais, Lille (A1), Cambrai, Saint-Quentin, Lyon (A5), Metz-Nancy (A4), Reims	
1.000 mi = 1.609 km; 1.000 km = 0.621 mi
