= A85 autoroute =

Road in France

Coordinates: 47.304011°N 0.84881°E

A85 autoroute

Route information
- Part of E60 / E604
- Maintained by Cofiroute
- Length: 206 km (128 mi)
- Existed: 1997–present

Major junctions
- West end: E60 / E501 / A 11 in Corzé

- E5 / E60 / A 10 in Veigné

- East end: E9 / A 71 in Theillay

Location
- Country: France

Highway system
- Roads in France; Autoroutes; Routes nationales

The A85 autoroute is a motorway in France. It connects the A11 at Angers to the A71 at Vierzon. It is 270 km long.

A85

== History ==
The motorway was opened in 1997. It starts at the Péage de Corzé north of Angers and in 1997 went to Bourgueil. In 2007 the Bourgueil to Langeais 26 km extension was opened. In December 2007 the remaining Azay-le-Rideau to Theillay section opening making 206 km in total.

== List of exits and junctions ==
Region	Department	Junctions	Destinations	Notes
Pays de la Loire	Maine-et-Loire	A11 - A85	Paris, Le Mans, Nantes, Angers	
Pays de la Loire	Maine-et-Loire	Péage de Corzé		
Pays de la Loire	Maine-et-Loire	1 : Beaufort-en-Vallée	Beaufort-en-Vallée	
Pays de la Loire	Maine-et-Loire	Aire de Longué-La Couaille (Eastbound); Aire de Longué-Les Cossonnières (Westbound)		
Pays de la Loire	Maine-et-Loire	2 : Longué-Jumelles	Longué-Jumelles	
Pays de la Loire	Maine-et-Loire	3 : Vivy	Vivy, Vernantes, Saumur	
Centre-Val de Loire	Indre-et-Loire	Aire de Chouzé-sur-Loire (Eastbound); Aire de Saint-Nicolas-de-Bourgueil (Westbound)		
Centre-Val de Loire	Indre-et-Loire	5 : Bourgueil	Bourgueil, Chinon	
Centre-Val de Loire	Indre-et-Loire	Péage de Restigné		
Centre-Val de Loire	Indre-et-Loire	7 : Langeais	Cinq-Mars-la-Pile, Langeais, Saumur, Luynes	
Centre-Val de Loire	Indre-et-Loire	8 : Villandry	Vallères, Lignières-de-Touraine, Villandry	
Centre-Val de Loire	Indre-et-Loire	Aire des Jardins de Villandry		
Centre-Val de Loire	Indre-et-Loire	9 : Druye	Druye, Monts, Azay-le-Rideau, Chinon	
Centre-Val de Loire	Indre-et-Loire	9.1 : Tours	Tours	Entry and exit from Angers
Centre-Val de Loire	Indre-et-Loire	A10 - A85	Bordeaux, Poitiers, Châtellerault, Paris, Le Mans, Tours, Orléans	
Centre-Val de Loire	Indre-et-Loire	E60 / A 85 becomes E604 / A 85		
Centre-Val de Loire	Indre-et-Loire	Péage de Veigné		
Centre-Val de Loire	Indre-et-Loire	10 : Esvres-sur-Indre	Esvres-sur-Indre, Chambray-lès-Tours, Saint-Avertin, Châteauroux, Loches	
Centre-Val de Loire	Indre-et-Loire	Aire du Val de Cher		
Centre-Val de Loire	Indre-et-Loire	11 : Bléré	Bléré, Loches, Amboise, Montrichard, Chenonceau	
Centre-Val de Loire	Loir-et-Cher	Aire de La Canarderie; Aire du Bois de Faix		
Centre-Val de Loire	Loir-et-Cher	12 : Saint-Aignan	Saint-Romain-sur-Cher, Montrichard, Saint-Aignan	
Centre-Val de Loire	Loir-et-Cher	13 : Selles-sur-Cher	Chémery, Contres, Selles-sur-Cher, Cheverny	
Centre-Val de Loire	Loir-et-Cher	Aire de Romorantin		
Centre-Val de Loire	Loir-et-Cher	14 : Romorantin-Lanthenay	Blois, Romorantin-Lanthenay	
Centre-Val de Loire	Loir-et-Cher	Aire du Jarrier (Eastbound); Aire de La Grange Rouge (Westbound)		
Centre-Val de Loire	Loir-et-Cher	A71 - A85	Lyon, Clermont-Ferrand, Bourges, Vierzon, Paris, Orléans	
1.000 mi = 1.609 km; 1.000 km = 0.621 mi

== Proposed Extensions ==
- Bourges to Chalon-sur-Saône via Nevers
- Corzé to Rennes via Château-Gontier and Laval

== Sections Now Open ==
- Bourgueil to Langeais : Opened 29 January 2007 (26 km)
- Azay-le-Rideau to Esvres : Opening April 2008 (11lkm)
