= A16 autoroute =

Road in France

A16 autoroute
- L'Européenne

Route information
- Part of E15 / E40 / E44 / E402
- Maintained by SANEF and DIR Nord
- Length: 312 km (194 mi)
- Existed: 1991–present

Major junctions
- South end: N 104 in Attainville

- E44 / A 29 in Amiens; E402 / A 28 in Abbeville; E15 / A 26 / A 216 in Calais; E42 / A 25 in Dunkerque
- North end: E40 / A18 in Ghyvelde

Location
- Country: France
- Major cities: Beauvais, Amiens, Abbeville, Boulogne-sur-Mer, Calais, Dunkerque

Highway system
- Roads in France; Autoroutes; Routes nationales

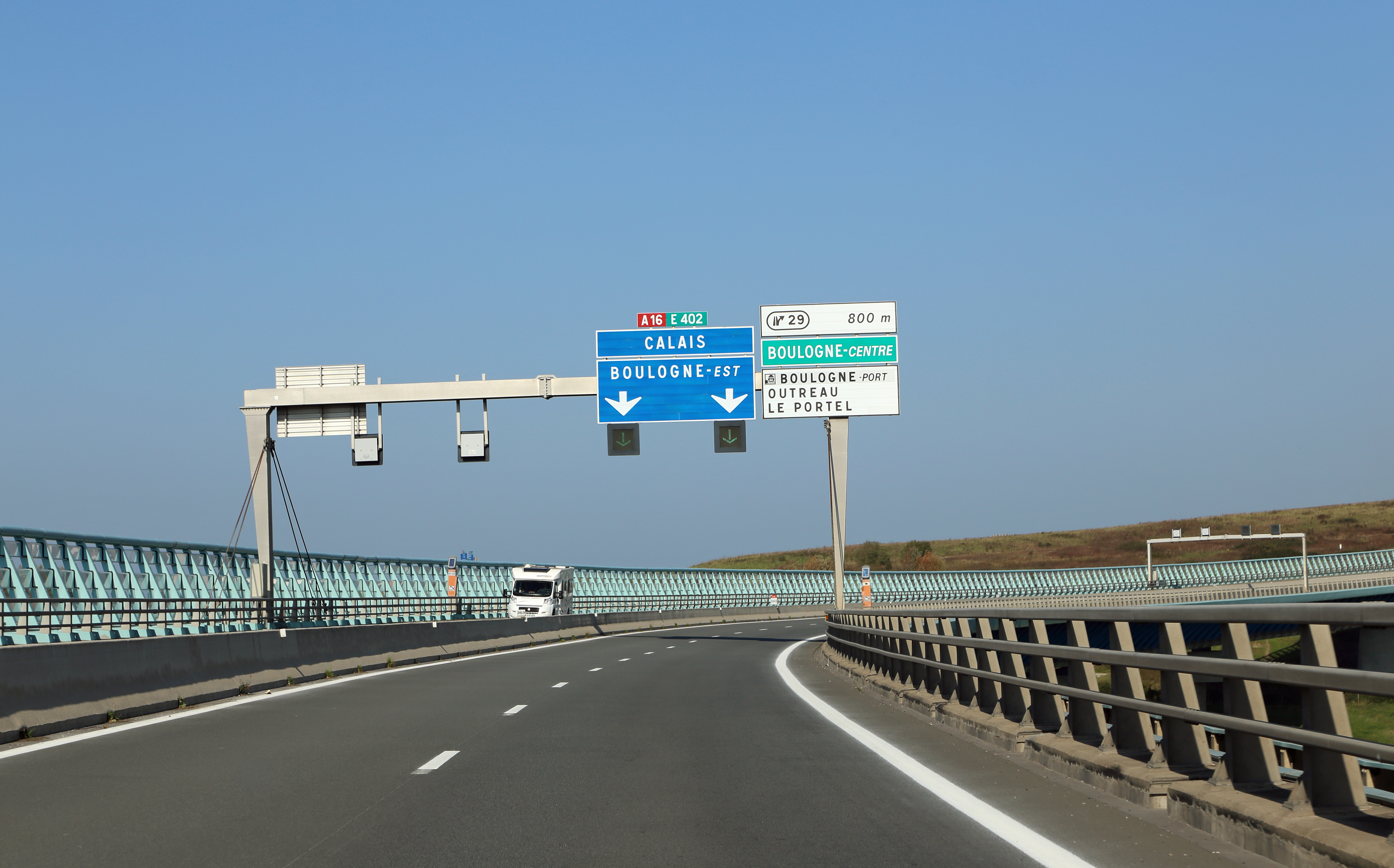
The A16 motorway on the Echinghen viaduct near Boulogne-sur-Mer (Pas-de-Calais)

The A16 autoroute – also known as L'Européenne and forming between Abbeville and Dunkirk a part of the larger Autoroute des estuaires – is a motorway in northern France.

The motorway, which has a total length of 327 km (203 mi), starts at a junction with the N104 Francilienne near Attainville in Île-de-France and ends at the Belgian frontier near Bray-Dunes, serving en route Beauvais, Amiens, Abbeville, Boulogne-sur-Mer, Calais and Dunkirk in Hauts-de-France. From its starting point near Paris, the A16 runs in a northerly direction, continues north parallel to the English Channel from Abbeville and then in an easterly direction along the North Sea coast. It is one of the two main routes between the Port of Calais/Channel Tunnel and Paris, the other being the A26 and A1 route to the east.

The vast majority of the motorway was built in the 1990s to relieve the congested RN1 between Paris and the Côte d'Opale (Boulogne and Calais). An 8 km southern extension between l'Isle-Adam and Attainville to a junction with the Paris ring road N104 (Francilienne) opened in 2020. Between Amblainville and Boulogne it is operated by the Société des Autoroutes du Nord et de l'Est de la France (SANEF) and is tolled. From Boulogne to the Belgian border the road is managed by the Direction Interdépartementale des Routes Nord (DIR Nord), which does not impose a toll.

This motorway does not have any officially designated "full" service areas – all of them are designated "Aire de Repos" (rest area).

== List of junctions and exits ==
Region	Department	Junction	Destinations	Notes
Île-de-France	Val-d'Oise	RN 104 - A16 + 9 : La Croix-Verte	Roissy, Ch-de-Gaulle, (A1)	
Île-de-France	Val-d'Oise	RN 104 - A16 + 9 : La Croix-Verte	Montsoult, Attainville, Belloy-en-France, Domont, Sarcelles, Paris - Porte de la Chapelle	
Île-de-France	Val-d'Oise	10 : Presles	L'Isle-Adam - centre, Presles, Nerville-la-Forêt	Northbound Exit only
Île-de-France	Val-d'Oise	RN 184 - A16	Paris - Porte Maillot (A115), Cergy-Pontoise (A15), Méry-sur-Oise, Presles	
Île-de-France	Val-d'Oise	11 : Mours	L'Isle-Adam - Parc d'Activités, Beaumont-sur-Oise, Mours, Champagne-sur-Oise, Persan, Chambly	
Île-de-France	Val-d'Oise	12 : Chambly	Persan, Chambly	
Hauts-de-France	Oise	Péage d'Amblainville		
Hauts-de-France	Oise	13 : Gisors	Méru, Gisors, Amblainville	
Hauts-de-France	Oise	Aire de repos de Lormaison		
Hauts-de-France	Oise	Aire de repos d'Auteuil (Northbound); Aire de repos de Grand Courtil (Southbound)		
Hauts-de-France	Oise	14 : Beauvais - sud	Beauvais, Allonne, Auneuil, Rouen, Mantes-la-Jolie (RN 31)	
Hauts-de-France	Oise	15 : Beauvais - nord	Beauvais, Troissereux, Milly-sur-Thérain, to Clermont, Compiègne, Creil	
Hauts-de-France	Oise	Aire de repos du Chêne Peuquet (Northbound); Aire de repos du Grand Bois (Southbound)		
Hauts-de-France	Oise	16 : Hardivillers	Breteuil, Saint-Just-en-Chaussée, Crèvecœur-le-Grand, Marseille-en-Beauvaisis, Gerberoy, La Corne-en-Vexin	
Hauts-de-France	Oise	Aire de repos d'Hardivillers		
Hauts-de-France	Somme			
Hauts-de-France	Somme	17 : Bosquel	Bosquel, Essertaux, Ailly-sur-Noye, Moreuil, Conty, Poix-de-Picardie	
Hauts-de-France	Somme	Aire de repos de la Vallée de la Selle		
Hauts-de-France	Somme	A29 - A16	Saint-Quentin, Amiens - sud, Reims, Lille	
Hauts-de-France	Somme	A 16 becomes E44 / A 16 / A 29		
Hauts-de-France	Somme	18 : Salouël	Amiens, Salouël, Saleux	
Hauts-de-France	Somme	A29 - A16	Rouen, Le Havre, Dieppe, Poix-de-Picardie	
Hauts-de-France	Somme	E44 / A 16 / A 29 becomes again A 16		
Hauts-de-France	Somme	19 : Amiens - ouest	Amiens	
Hauts-de-France	Somme	20 : Amiens - nord	Amiens, Longueau, RN 25 to Arras, Saint-Quentin	
Hauts-de-France	Somme	Aire de repos de Vignacourt		
Hauts-de-France	Somme	21 : Vallée de La Nièvre	Flixecourt, Ville-le-Marclet, Picquigny, Vignacourt, Flesselles, Saint-Léger-lès-Domart	
Hauts-de-France	Somme	Aire de repos du Haut Clocher (Northbound); Aire de repos de La Hétroye (Southbound)		
Hauts-de-France	Somme	22 : Abbeville - est	Abbeville, Saint-Riquier, Pont-Remy, Doullens	
Hauts-de-France	Somme	A28 - A16 + 23 : Abbeville - nord	Le Havre, Rouen, Le Tréport, Le Crotoy, Saint-Valery-sur-Somme	
Hauts-de-France	Somme	A28 - A16 + 23 : Abbeville - nord	Abbeville	
Hauts-de-France	Somme	A 16 becomes E402 / A 16		
Hauts-de-France	Somme	Aire de repos de la Baie de Somme		
Hauts-de-France	Somme	24 : Côte Picardie	Rue, Le Crotoy, Saint-Valery-sur-Somme, Fort-Mahon-Plage, Quend, Crécy-en-Ponthieu	
Hauts-de-France	Pas-de-Calais	Aire de repos du Bois de la Commanderie (Northbound); Aire de repos du Fond de la Commanderie (Southbound)		
Hauts-de-France	Pas-de-Calais	25 : Berck	Berck, Montreuil-sur-Mer, Merlimont, Fort-Mahon-Plage, Quend, Arras (RD 939)	
Hauts-de-France	Pas-de-Calais	26 : Étaples - Le Touquet	Étaples, Le Touquet-Paris-Plage, Montreuil-sur-Mer, Merlimont, Cucq, Sainte-Cécile, Stella-Plage	
Hauts-de-France	Pas-de-Calais	Aire de repos des Falaises de Widehem		
Hauts-de-France	Pas-de-Calais	27 : Neufchâtel-Hardelot	Neufchâtel-Hardelot, Sainte-Cécile, Dannes, Condette	
Hauts-de-France	Pas-de-Calais	28 : Boulogne - sud	Boulogne-sur-Mer, Isques, Hesdin-l'Abbé, Pont-de-Briques, Samer, Desvres	
Hauts-de-France	Pas-de-Calais	Péage de Herquelingue		
Hauts-de-France	Pas-de-Calais	29 : Boulogne - Port	Boulogne-sur-Mer - centre, Outreau, Le Portel, Saint-Léonard, Saint-Étienne-au-Mont	
Hauts-de-France	Pas-de-Calais	30 : Saint-Martin-Boulogne	Boulogne-sur-Mer, Saint-Martin-Boulogne, Baincthun, Desvres	
Hauts-de-France	Pas-de-Calais	31 : Boulogne - est	Boulogne-sur-Mer, Saint-Martin-Boulogne, La Capelle-lès-Boulogne, Baincthun, Desvres, Saint-Omer, Lille	
Hauts-de-France	Pas-de-Calais	32 : Boulogne - nord	Boulogne-sur-Mer, Wimereux, Wimille	
Hauts-de-France	Pas-de-Calais	33 : La Trésorerie	Wimereux, Wimille, Wacquinghen	
Hauts-de-France	Pas-de-Calais	34 : Wacquinghen	Wacquinghen, Offrethun, Beuvrequen	
Hauts-de-France	Pas-de-Calais	Aire de repos de L'Épitre (Northbound)		
Hauts-de-France	Pas-de-Calais	35 : Marquise - sud	Marquise, Rinxent, Beuvrequen	
Hauts-de-France	Pas-de-Calais	36 : Marquise - nord	Marquise, Rinxent, Guînes, Wissant	
Hauts-de-France	Pas-de-Calais	37 : Saint-Inglevert - sud	Saint-Inglevert, Leubringhen	
Hauts-de-France	Pas-de-Calais	Aire de repos des Deux Caps (Southbound)		
Hauts-de-France	Pas-de-Calais	38 : Saint-Inglevert - nord	Saint-Inglevert, Wissant	
Hauts-de-France	Pas-de-Calais	39 : Bonningues-lès-Calais	Bonningues-lès-Calais, Peuplingues	
Hauts-de-France	Pas-de-Calais	40 : Peuplingues	Peuplingues, Escalles, Fréthun	
Hauts-de-France	Pas-de-Calais	41 : Coquelles	Coquelles, Sangatte	
Hauts-de-France	Pas-de-Calais	42 : Eurotunnel	Folkestone, Londres (UK)	
Hauts-de-France	Pas-de-Calais	E402 / A 16 becomes E15 / E402 / A 16		
Hauts-de-France	Pas-de-Calais	43 : Calais - Rivière-Neuve	Calais - centre, Guînes, Coulogne, Blériot-Plage	
Hauts-de-France	Pas-de-Calais	44 : Calais - Saint-Pierre	Calais	
Hauts-de-France	Pas-de-Calais	45 : Ardres	Calais, Ardres	Entrance only
Hauts-de-France	Pas-de-Calais	46 Calais - Porte de Saint-Omer	Calais, Coulogne, RD 943 to Ardres, Saint-Omer	
Hauts-de-France	Pas-de-Calais	A26 - A16 + 47 : Calais - Port (A216)	Saint-Omer, Arras, Reims	
Hauts-de-France	Pas-de-Calais	A26 - A16 + 47 : Calais - Port (A216)	Car-Ferry, Calais - Z. I. Est	
Hauts-de-France	Pas-de-Calais	E15 / E402 / A 16 becomes E40 / A 16		
Hauts-de-France	Pas-de-Calais	48 Marck - ouest	Marck	
Hauts-de-France	Pas-de-Calais	49 Marck - est	Marck	
Hauts-de-France	Pas-de-Calais	Aire de repos d'Offekerque (Northbound)		
Hauts-de-France	Pas-de-Calais	50 Nouvelle-Église	Nouvelle-Église, Oye-Plage, Audruicq	
Hauts-de-France	Pas-de-Calais	51 Saint-Folquin	Gravelines, Grand-Fort-Philippe, Saint-Folquin	
Hauts-de-France	Nord	52/52a/b : Bourbourg	Bourbourg, Saint-Georges-sur-l'Aa, Gravelines	
Hauts-de-France	Nord	53 : Craywick - Loon-Plage	Loon-Plage, Craywick, Bourbourg, Mardyck, Saint-Omer, Dunkerque - Port/Car-Ferry	
Hauts-de-France	Nord	54/54a/54b : Grande-Synthe	Grande-Synthe, Spycker	
Hauts-de-France	Nord	55 Grande-Synthe - Courghain	Grande-Synthe, Polyclinique de Grande-Synthe	No northbound exit
Hauts-de-France	Nord	56 : Grande-Synthe - centre	Grande-Synthe - Moulin	
Hauts-de-France	Nord	57/57a/b : Dunkerque - Z. I	Grande-Synthe, Fort-Mardyck, Dunkerque, Bergues, Armentières, Lille (A25)	
Hauts-de-France	Nord	58 : Dunkerque - Petite-Synthe	Dunkerque - Pont-Loby, Saint-Pol-sur-Mer, Z. I de Petite-Synthe	
Hauts-de-France	Nord	59 : Cappelle-la-Grande	Dunkerque - Jeu-de-Mail, Cappelle-la-Grande	No northbound exit
Hauts-de-France	Nord	60 : Coudekerque-Branche - centre	Coudekerque-Branche, Cappelle-la-Grande	
Hauts-de-France	Nord	61 : Coudekerque-Branche - est	Coudekerque-Branche	
Hauts-de-France	Nord	62 Dunkerque - centre	Dunkerque - Malo, Dunkerque - Rosendaël	
Hauts-de-France	Nord	63 : Téteghem	Téteghem, Leffrinckoucke, Zuydcoote,	No southbound exit
Hauts-de-France	Nord	64 : Leffrinckoucke	Téteghem, Leffrinckoucke, Zuydcoote	No northbound exit
Hauts-de-France	Nord	65 : Ghyvelde	Ghyvelde, Bray-Dunes, Hondschoote, Les Moëres, Steenvoorde	
Hauts-de-France	Nord	Aire de repos du Ghyvelde (Northbound); Aire de repos des Moëres (Southbound)		
French - Belgian Border ; E40 / A 16 becomes Belgian road E40 / A18
1.000 mi = 1.609 km; 1.000 km = 0.621 mi

== Future extensions ==
Currently the A16 runs from junction number 8 to junction number 65. This leads to speculation that the southern end of the motorway is intended to be extended either directly south by upgrading the RD301/RN1 to meet the A1 at Saint-Denis, Seine-Saint-Denis, or to the east by upgrading the RN104 to meet the A1 at Paris-Charles De Gaulle, thus completing the missing junction numbers.
