= A81 autoroute =

Road in France

A81 autoroute
- L'Armoricaine
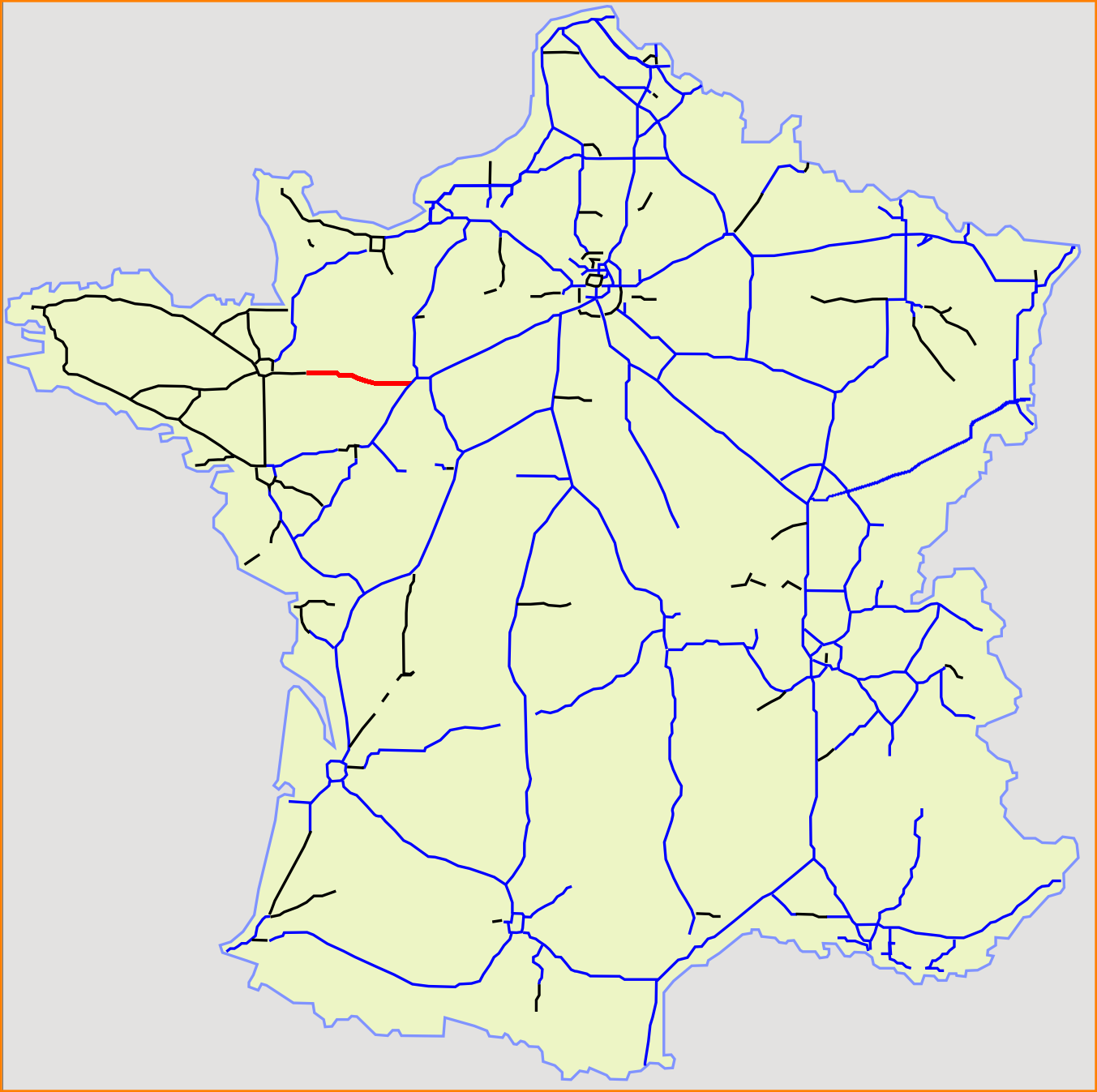

Route information
- Part of E50
- Maintained by Cofiroute
- Length: 93 km (58 mi)
- Existed: 1980–present

Major junctions
- West end: E50 / E501 / A 11 in La Chapelle-Saint-Aubin

- East end: E50 / N 157 in La Gravelle

Location
- Country: France

Highway system
- Roads in France; Autoroutes; Routes nationales

The A81 autoroute is a motorway in north-western France. It forms the first part of a long-term project to upgrade the road connection between Le Mans and Brest to motorway standard throughout. Until 1982 the motorway was known as the F11. The A81 is a part of European route E50 linking Brest to Makhachkala in Russia.

Section completed:

- Le Mans - La Gravelle (managed by Cofiroute) (94.8 km (58.9 mi))

Sections not yet upgraded:

- N157: La Gravelle - Rennes (40.9 km (25.4 mi))
- N12: Rennes - Brest (228.0 km (141.7 mi))

== List of exits and junctions ==
Region	Department	Junctions	Destinations	Notes
Pays de la Loire	Sarthe	A11 - A81	Paris, Tours, Alençon (A28), Le Mans - Z. I. Nord, Z. I. Sud, centre, Nantes, Angers	
Pays de la Loire	Sarthe	Aire de La Landrière (Eastbound); Aire de La Chevallerie (Westbound)		
Pays de la Loire	Sarthe	Aire des Gripperies (Eastbound); Aire de La Coire (Westbound)		
Pays de la Loire	Sarthe	1 : Sillé-le-Guillaume - Sablé	Sillé-le-Guillaume, Sablé-sur-Sarthe, Loué	
Pays de la Loire	Sarthe	Aire des Gripperies (Eastbound); Aire de La Coire (Westbound)		
Pays de la Loire	Sarthe	Aire de Chartres-Gasville (Westbound); Aire de Chartres-Bois Paris (Eastbound)		
Pays de la Loire	Sarthe	2 : Évron	Château-Gontier, Évron, Sablé-sur-Sarthe	
Pays de la Loire	Sarthe	Aire de Villeray (Eastbound); Aire de Loriolet (Westbound)		
Pays de la Loire	Sarthe	Aire de la Mayenne		
Pays de la Loire	Sarthe	3 : Laval - est	Laval, Mayenne, Château-Gontier	
Pays de la Loire	Sarthe	Aire du Château de Ricourdet (Westbound)		
Pays de la Loire	Sarthe	4 : Laval - ouest	Laval, Ernée, Craon, Saint-Berthevin, Fougères	
Pays de la Loire	Sarthe	Aire de la Paplonnière (Eastbound); Aire de la Sorinière (Westbound)		
Pays de la Loire	Sarthe	Péage de La Gravelle		
Pays de la Loire	Sarthe	5 : La Gravelle	Laval, La Gravelle, Vitré - est, Argentré-du-Plessis	
E50 / A 81 becomes E50 / N 157
1.000 mi = 1.609 km; 1.000 km = 0.621 mi
