= European route E50 =

Road in trans-European E-road network

E50

Route information
- Length: 5,100 km (3,200 mi)

Major junctions
- West end: E60 in Brest, France
- E5 / E15 in Paris, France; E25 in Metz, France; E35 south of Walldorf, Germany; E45 in Nuremberg, Germany; E55 / E65 in Prague, Czech Republic; E75 in Trenčín, Slovakia; E85 in Ternopil, Ukraine; E95 in Uman, Ukraine; E40 in Debaltseve, Ukraine
- East end: E119 in Makhachkala, Russia

Location
- Countries: France, Germany, Czech Republic, Slovakia, Ukraine, Russia

Highway system
- International E-road network; A Class; B Class

European route E50 is an A-type east–west connection across the European continent. It connects the key naval port of Brest in France with Makhachkala, on the Caspian Sea in Dagestan, Russia.

== History ==
Since 2014, parts of the road in eastern Ukraine have been under the control of the separatist Donetsk People's Republic and Luhansk People's Republic. Since April 2021, M12 and M04 Stryi – Kropyvnytskyi – Debaltseve were combined into M30. During the Russian invasion of Ukraine, Russia took direct control of the areas in Donbas.

== Outlook ==
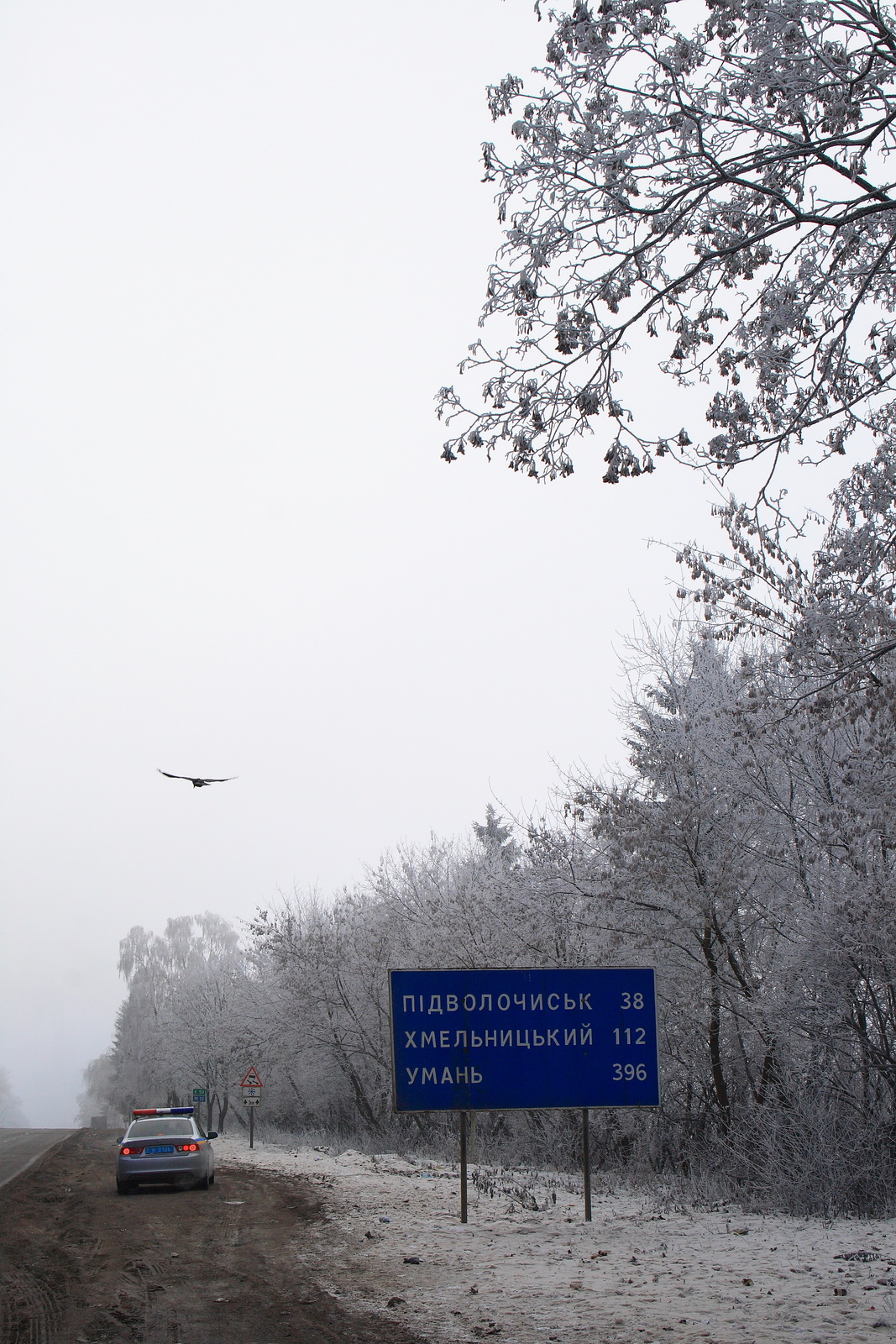
E50 near Ternopil in Ukraine, looking east towards Khmelnytskyi and Uman

Half the route comprises highways and the other half provincial roads. The route runs fully across the European continent. It is one of the longest E-roads on the continent.

== Route ==
- France
  - D 112: Brest ( E60) - Gouesnou
  - N 12: Gouesnou - Saint-Brieuc - Tramain ( E401) - Rennes
  - N 136: Rennes ( E3)
  - N 157: Rennes ( E3) - La Gravelle
  - A 81: La Gravelle - Laval - Le Mans ( E501)
  - A 11: Le Mans ( E501 E502) - Ablis
  - A 10: Ablis ( E5) - Massy ( E5 E15)
  - A 6b: Massy ( E5 E15) - Paris ( E15)
  - Boulevard Périphérique: Paris ( E15 E54)
  - A 4: Paris ( E15) - Reims ( E17 E46 E420) - Châlons-en-Champagne ( E17) - Metz ( E21 E23 E25) - Freyming-Merlebach ( E25)
  - A 320: Freyming-Merlebach ( E25) - Forbach
- Germany
  - A 6 Saarbrücken ( E29 E422) - Mannheim ( E31 E35) - Heilbronn ( E41) - Feuchtwangen ( E43) - Nürnberg ( E45 E51 E56) - Waidhaus
- Czech Republic
  - D5: Rozvadov - Plzeň ( E49 E53) - Prague ( E48 E55)
  - D0: Prague ( E48 E55 E59 E65)
  - D1: Prague (Start of Concurrency with E59 E65) - Humpolec ( E551) - Jihlava (End of Concurrency with E59) - Brno ( E461 E462, End of Concurrency with E65)
  - I/50: Brno ( E462) - Starý Hrozenkov
- Slovakia
  - I/9: Drietoma - Trenčín ( E572, Start of Concurrency with E75 )
  - D1: Trenčín ( E75 E572) - Žilina ( E442, End of concurrency with E75) - Martin
  - I/18: Martin - Ružomberok ( E77)
  - D1: Ružomberok - Prešov - Bidovce
  - I/19: Bidovce ( E58 E71 E571) - Vyšné Nemecké
- Ukraine
  - M 08: Uzhhorod border - Uzhhorod ( E573)
  - M 06: Uzhhorod ( E573) - Mukachevo ( E81 E471, End of Concurrency with E58) - Stryi ( E471)
  - M 12: Stryi ( E471) - Ternopil ( E85) - Khmelnytskyi - Vinnytsia ( E583) - Uman ( E95) - Kropyvnytskyi ( E584)
  - M 04: Kropyvnytskyi ( E584) - Oleksandriia ( E584) - Dnipro ( E105) - Donetsk - Debaltseve ( E40)
  - M 03: Debaltseve ( E40) - Dovzhansky
- Russia
  - A 270: border with Ukraine - Novoshakhtinsk (Start of concurrency with E115)
  - M 4: Novoshakhtinsk - Rostov-on-Don ( E58) - Pavlovskaya (End of concurrency with E115)
  - R 217: Pavlovskaya ( E115) - Armavir - Mineralnye Vody ( E117) - Beslan ( E117) - Makhachkala ( E119)
  - Major towns along the R217 highway (Russia) include Kropotkin, Nevinnomyssk, Mineralnye Vody, Pyatigorsk, Nalchik, Beslan, Grozny, Gudermes, Khasavyurt, Makhachkala, and Derbent on the Caspian Sea. After skirting the Greater Caucasus, the route continues to Baku.
