= European route E551 =

Road in trans-European E-road network

E551

Route information
- Length: 112 km (70 mi)

Major junctions
- From: České Budějovice
- To: Humpolec

Location
- Countries: Czech Republic

Highway system
- International E-road network; A Class; B Class

E 551 is a European B class road in the Czech Republic, connecting České Budějovice and Humpolec.

== Route and E-road junctions ==
- Czech Republic (on shared signage I 34)
  - České Budějovice: E49, E55
  - Humpolec: E50
