= Route nationale 25 =

Road in France

The Route nationale 25 is a motorway in northern France. It connects the towns of Amiens and Arras and is approximately 68 km long.

== Route ==
Until recently, the road used to begin at a junction with the N1 in the centre of Amiens at the Esplanade Édouard Branly. The road followed Rue du Marechal de Lattre de Tassigny to the north. The new road now starts at a junction with the A29 autoroute and forms the north east section of the town's by-pass. The routes re-converge at junction 38 with the RN 25 heading north and the by-pass becoming the RN 1.

The road passes Villers-Bocage passing through open countryside. After Beauval the road drops into the Authie valley and the town of Doullens. The road turns east thereafter and passes several British War Cemeteries. The road passes Beaumetz-lès-Loges before reaching the outskirts of Arras.

The new road becomes the towns north west by-pass ending at a junction with the RN 17. The old road is now numbered the RD 265 and named Route de Doullens into the town centre.

Before, until the seventies, the RN 25 was linking Le Havre and Lille passing by Fécamp, Saint-Valery-en-Caux, Dieppe, Eu, Abbeville, Doullens, Arras, Carvin and Seclin. It has been renamed RD 925 except between Doullens and Arras (where it's still RN 25), Arras and Carvin (where it's RD 917) and Seclin and Lille (where it's RD 549).
