= A88 autoroute =

Road in France

A88 autoroute
- Autoroute de la Licorne
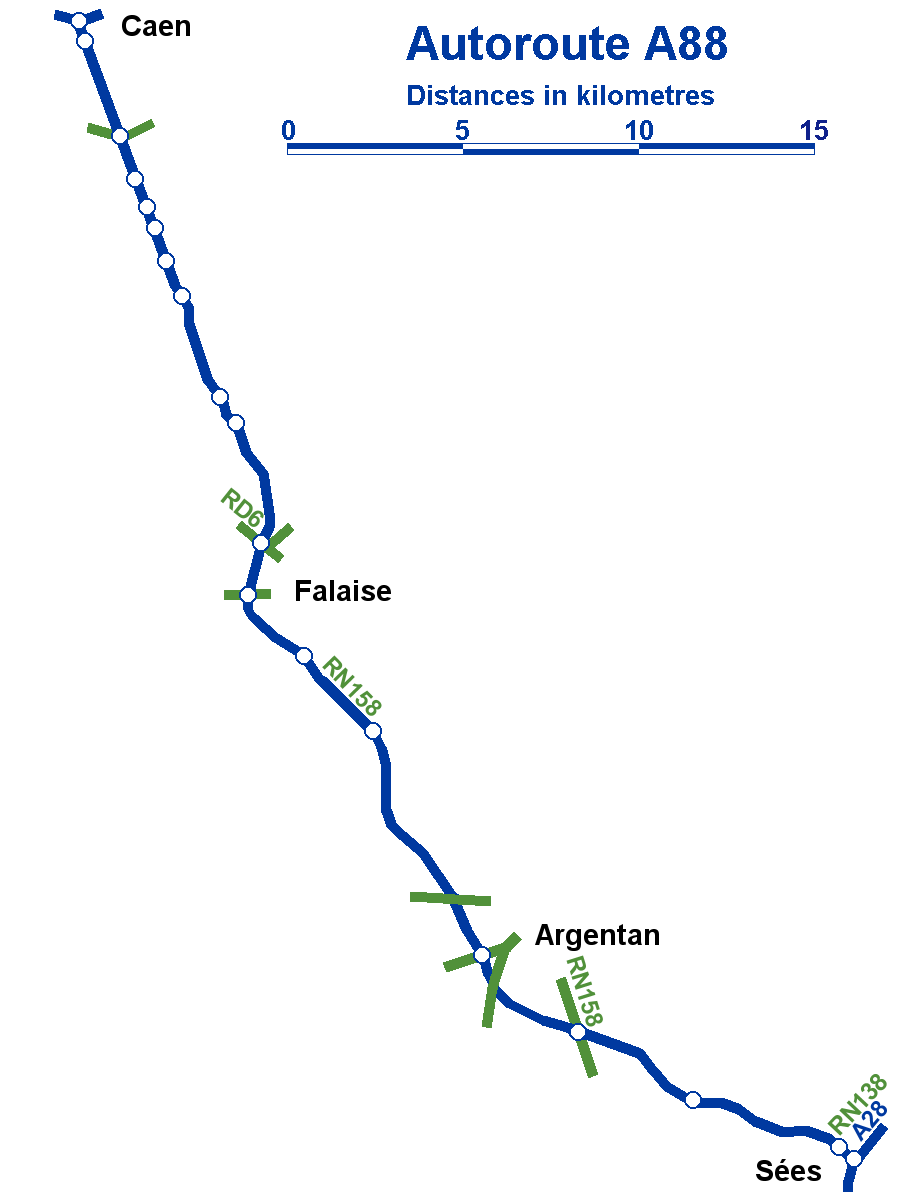

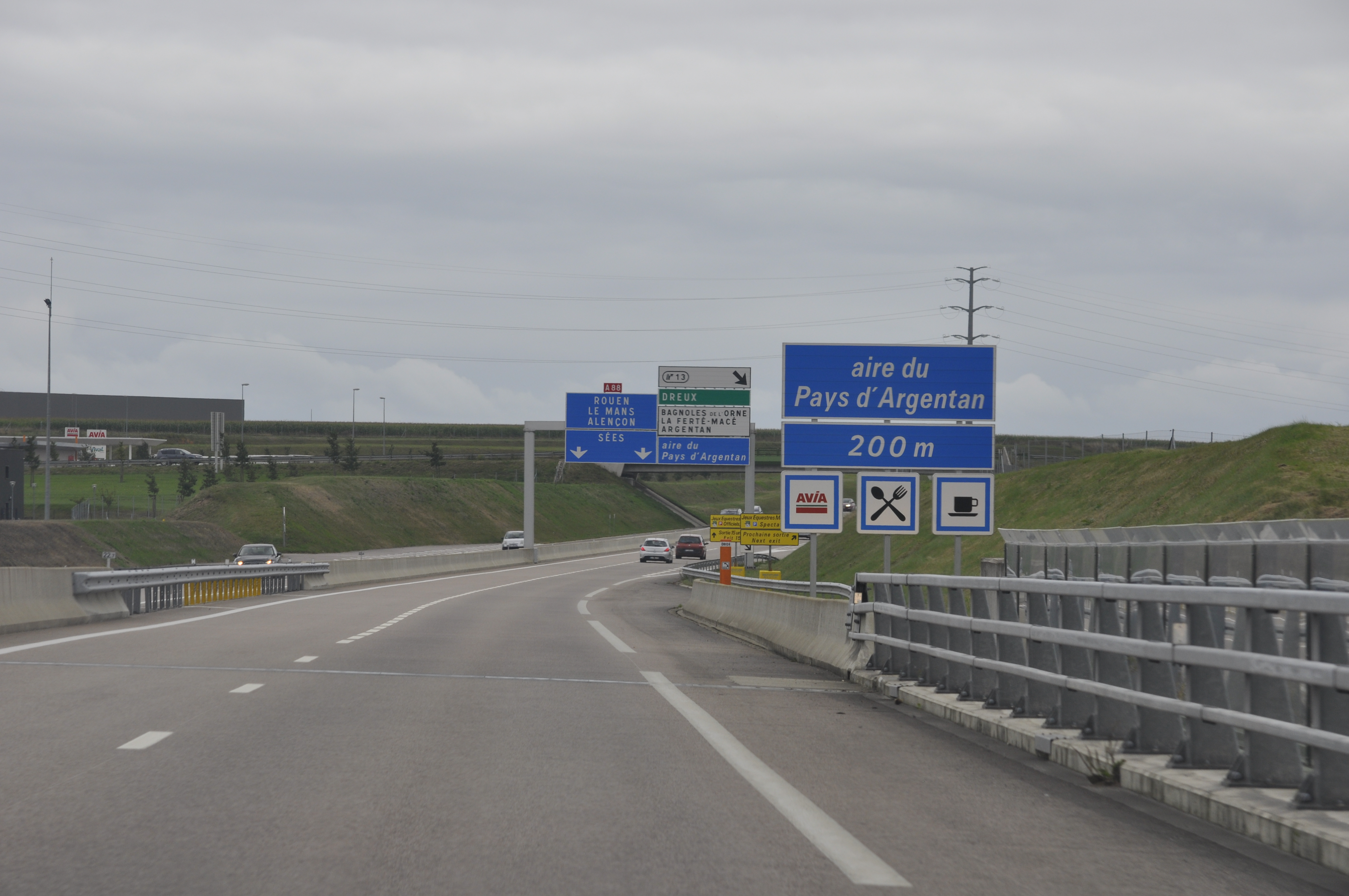

Route information
- Maintained by ALis and Alicorne
- Length: 45 km (28 mi)
- Existed: 2010–present

Major junctions
- South end: E402 / A 28 in Sees

- North end: N 158 in Falaise

Location
- Country: France
- Major cities: Falaise, Argentan

Highway system
- Roads in France; Autoroutes; Routes nationales
| ← A 87 | → A 89 |

The A88 motorway is a French toll motorway that connects Caen to the A28 for Le Mans for Central and Southern France. Its inauguration took place on 26 August 2010 by Dominique Bussereau, Secretary of State for Transport. It doubles the old RN 158.

A88 traffic information is provided by Normandie Traffic Radio, which is broadcast on 107.7 FM.

== List of exits and junctions ==
| Region | Department | km | mi | Junction | Destinations | Notes |
|---|---|---|---|---|---|---|
| Normandie | Orne | 0.0 | 0.0 | A28 - A88 | Le Havre, Rouen, Lisieux | |
| Normandie | Orne | 0.0 | 0.0 | A28 - A88 | Tours, Le Mans, Alençon | |
| Normandie | Orne | Péage de Sées | | | | |
| Normandie | Orne | 1.0 | 0.62 | 16 : Sées - nord | Sées, Mortagne-au-Perche | |
| Normandie | Orne | 10 | 6.21 | 15 : Mortrée | Mortrée, Haras du Pin | |
| Normandie | Orne | 16 | 9.94 | 14 : Argentan - sud | Argentan | |
| Normandie | Orne | 22 | 13.67 | 13 : Argentan - ouest + Aire de service du Pays d'Argentan | Dreux, Flers, Bagnoles-de-l'Orne, La Ferté Macé, Argentan - centre | |
| Normandie | Orne | Péage de Rônai | | | | |
| Normandie | Orne | 35 | 21.78 | 12 : Nécy | Nécy, Rônai | |
| Normandie | Calvados | 40 | 24.85 | 11.1 : Falaise - sud | Falaise, Alençon par RD, Argentan par RD | |
| Normandie | Calvados | 45 | 27.96 | 11 : Falaise - ouest | Falaise, Pont-d'Ouilly, Putanges-Pont-Écrepin, Condé-sur-Noireau | |
A 88 becomes N 158
1.000 mi = 1.609 km; 1.000 km = 0.621 mi
