= European route E606 =

Road in trans-European E-road network

E606

Route information
- Length: 120 km (75 mi)

Major junctions
- From: Angoulême
- To: Bordeaux

Location
- Countries: France

Highway system
- International E-road network; A Class; B Class

European route E 606 is a European B class road in France, connecting the cities Angoulême and Bordeaux.

== Route ==
- France
  - E603 Angoulême
  - E05, E70, E72 Bordeaux
