= Beaumont-sur-Sarthe =

- Commune
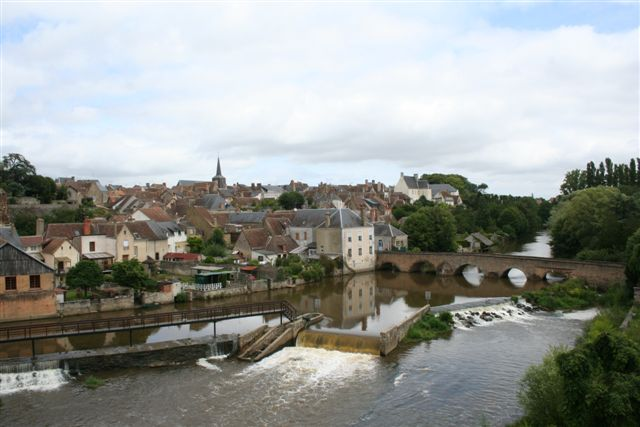
- View of the town and river

- Coat of arms
- Location of Beaumont-sur-Sarthe
- Location within France Location within Pays de la Loire
- Coordinates: 48°13′37″N 0°07′53″E
- Country: France
- Region: Pays de la Loire
- Department: Sarthe
- Arrondissement: Mamers
- Canton: Sillé-le-Guillaume
- Intercommunality: CC Haute Sarthe Alpes Mancelles

Government
  - Mayor (2020–2026): Lea Duval
- Area^{1}: 6.64 km^{2} (2.56 sq mi)
- Population (2023): 1,972
  - Density: 297/km^{2} (769/sq mi)
- Time zone: UTC+01:00 (CET)
  - Summer (DST): UTC+02:00 (CEST)
- INSEE/Postal code: 72029 /72170
- ^{1} French Land Register data, which excludes lakes, ponds, glaciers > 1 km^{2} (0.386 sq mi or 247 acres) and river estuaries.

Beaumont-sur-Sarthe (French pronunciation: [bomɔ̃ syʁ saʁt], literally Beaumont on Sarthe; pre-revolutionary name: Beaumont-le-Vicomte) is a commune in the Sarthe department and Pays de la Loire region of north-western France.

The residents of Beaumont are known in French as les Belmontais.

== Geography ==
As the name indicates, Beaumont lies on the river Sarthe. The town is midway between Alençon (23 km) and Le Mans (25 km). Ballon and Fresnay-sur-Sarthe are each 10 km away, Sillé-le-Guillaume is 20 km and Mamers 22 km away.

== Twin towns ==
(France) Beaumont-sur-Sarthe is twinned with the town of Burgh le Marsh in Lincolnshire, England.

== See also ==
- Communes of the Sarthe department
