= Saint-Ciers-sur-Gironde =

- Commune
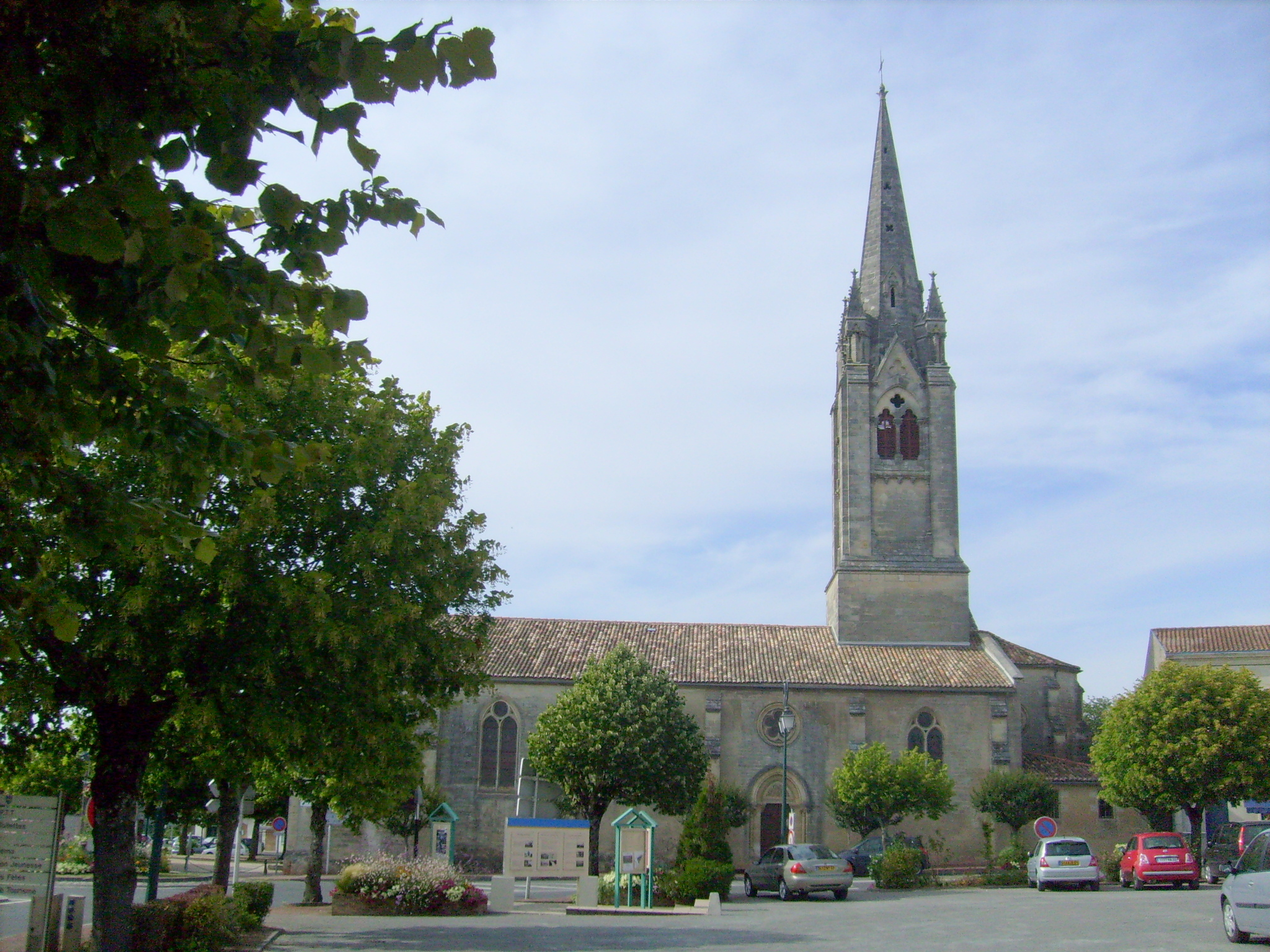
- The church in Saint-Ciers-sur-Gironde

- Coat of arms
- Location of Saint-Ciers-sur-Gironde
- Location within France Location within Nouvelle-Aquitaine
- Coordinates: 45°17′30″N 0°36′33″W
- Country: France
- Region: Nouvelle-Aquitaine
- Department: Gironde
- Arrondissement: Blaye
- Canton: L'Estuaire
- Intercommunality: Estuaire

Government
  - Mayor (2020–2026): Pierre Caritan
- Area^{1}: 38.34 km^{2} (14.80 sq mi)
- Elevation: 7 m (23 ft)
- Highest elevation: 57 m (187 ft)
- Lowest elevation: 0 m (0 ft)
- Population (2023): 3,175
  - Density: 82.81/km^{2} (214.5/sq mi)
- Time zone: UTC+01:00 (CET)
  - Summer (DST): UTC+02:00 (CEST)
- INSEE/Postal code: 33389 /33820
- ^{1} French Land Register data, which excludes lakes, ponds, glaciers > 1 km^{2} (0.386 sq mi or 247 acres) and river estuaries.

Saint-Ciers-sur-Gironde (French pronunciation: [sɛ̃ sje syʁ ʒiʁɔ̃d], literally Saint-Ciers on Gironde) is a commune in the Gironde department in Nouvelle-Aquitaine in southwestern France.

== Population ==
Historical population
Year	Pop.	±% p.a.
1968	2,156	—
1975	2,011	−0.99%
1982	2,917	+5.46%
1990	2,906	−0.05%
1999	3,095	+0.70%
2007	3,097	+0.01%
2012	3,059	−0.25%
2017	3,012	−0.31%
2023	3,175	+0.88%
Source: INSEE

== See also ==
- Communes of the Gironde department
