= European route E5 =

Road in trans-European E-road network

E5

Major junctions
- North end: Greenock, Scotland
- South end: Algeciras, Spain

Location
- Countries: United Kingdom, France, Spain

Highway system
- International E-road network; A Class; B Class
← E4	→ E6

The European route E5 is part of the United Nations international E-road network. It is the westernmost north–south "reference road", running from Greenock in Scotland, south through Great Britain and France to Algeciras, Spain. The route is 1,900 miles (3,100 km) long, and involves one ferry crossing between Portsmouth, UK and Le Havre, France. Also, The European route E5 passed from the D.100 State Road formerly.

== United Kingdom ==
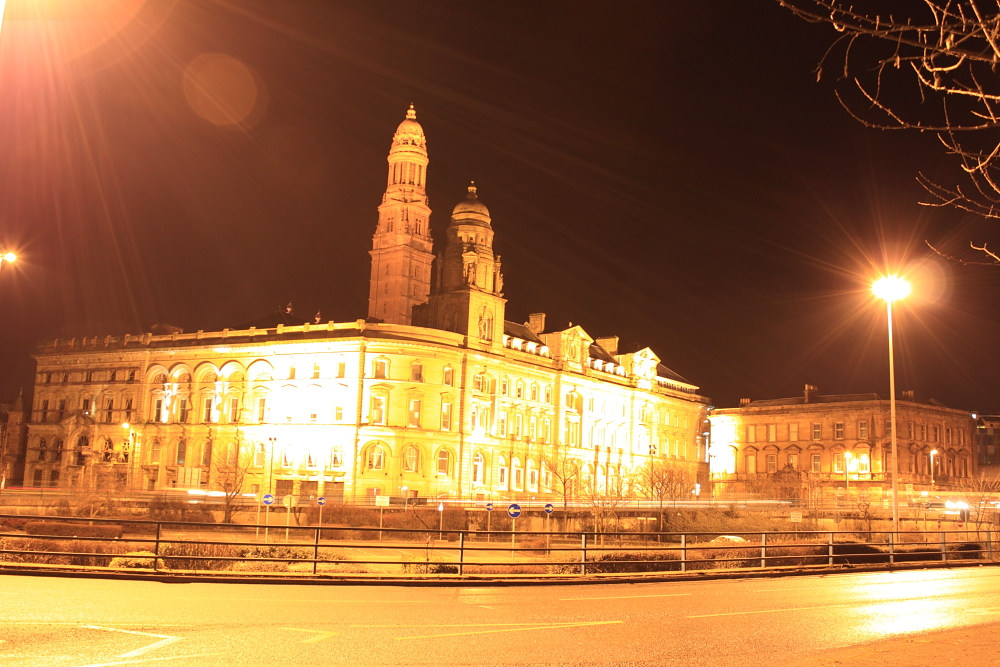
The start of E5 at Greenock Municipal Buildings

Although the United Kingdom Government participates fully in activities concerning the E-routes, E-routes are not signposted within the United Kingdom. Hence the first 724 km of the route is not signed.

The E5 has a gap at the English Channel between Southampton and Le Havre, France. There is no direct ferry link, but a ferry from nearby Portsmouth, along the M27, connects to Le Havre.

== France ==
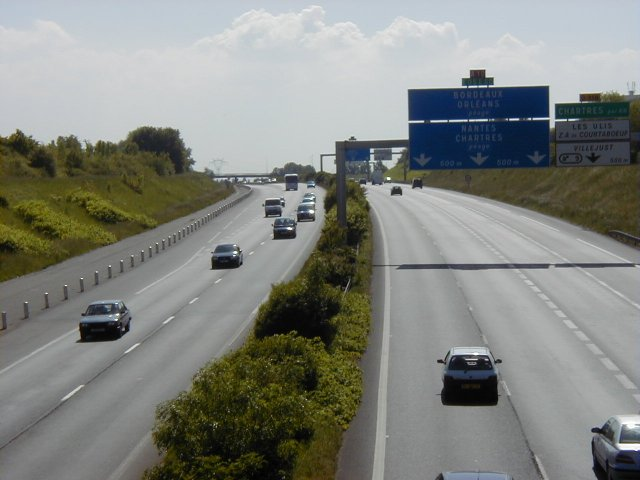
E 5 near Villebon-sur-Yvette in France

The E5 arrives from the non-existing ferry from Southampton in Le Havre. It passes the capital Paris, before continuing southwest to Orléans, Tours and Bordeaux. It ends at the border town of Hendaye with Spain. It covers a distance of 985 km (612 mi).

== Spain ==
The E5 crosses the French border at Irun, it passes the major cities of San Sebastián, Vitoria-Gasteiz and Burgos before it arrives at the nation's capital Madrid. It continues south of Madrid towards Andalusia, passing Córdoba, Seville, Jerez de la Frontera and Cádiz to end at the port city of Algeciras.

== Route ==
- United Kingdom
  - A8: Greenock –
  - M8: – Glasgow (Interchange with ( E16)
  - M74 / A74(M): Glasgow – Anglo-Scottish border (Start of multiplex with E18 at)
  - M6: Anglo-Scottish border – Cannock (End of multiplex with E18 at Carlisle, interchange with E20 and multiplex with E22 at Warrington)
  - M6: Cannock – OR: Birmingham Northern Relief Road (Whole length) (Interchange with E24)
  - M42: Birmingham
  - M40: Birmingham – Oxford
  - A34: Oxford – Winchester (Interchange with E30 at Newbury)
  - M3: Winchester – Southampton
  - M27: Southampton — Portsmouth
  - M275: Portsmouth — Ferry Terminal
- Gap (English Channel)
  - (United Kingdom) Portsmouth – (France) Le Havre
- France
  - N 282: Le Havre
  - A 131: Le Havre ( E44) – Tancarville
  - N 182: Tancarville
  - A 131: Tancarville – Bourneville ( E46)
  - A 13: Bourneville (Start of Concurrency with E46) – Rouen (End of Concurrency with E46) – Paris
  - Boulevard Périphérique: Paris ( E15 E19 E50, Towards E54)
  - A 6a: Paris ( E15) – Massy ( E15 E50)
  - A 10: Massy ( E15 E50) – Ablis ( E50) – Orléans ( E9, Start of Concurrency with E5) – Tours ( E502 E604, End of Concurrency with E5) – Poitiers ( E62) – Niort ( E601) – Saintes ( E602 E603) – Bordeaux
  - N 230: Bordeaux (Start of Concurrency with E70)
  - A 630: Bordeaux ( E72)
  - A 63: Bordeaux – Bayonne (Start of Concurrency with E80) – Hendaye
- Spain
  - AP-1 / AP-8: Irún – Donostia/S. Sebastián – Eibar (End of Concurrency with E70) –
  - AP-1: Eibar ( E70) – Miranda de Ebro ( E804) – Burgos
  - A-1: Burgos (End of Concurrency with E80) – Madrid
  - M-30: Madrid ( E90 E901)
  - A-4: Madrid ( E90) – Manzanares ( E903) – Bailén ( E902) – Córdoba – Sevilla ( E1, Towards E803)
  - AP-4 Seville - Jerez de la Frontera - Cádiz
  - A-48 Cádiz - Vejer de la Frontera
  - N-340 Vejer de la Frontera - Tarifa - Algeciras ( E15)
