= A87 autoroute =

Road in France

A87 autoroute

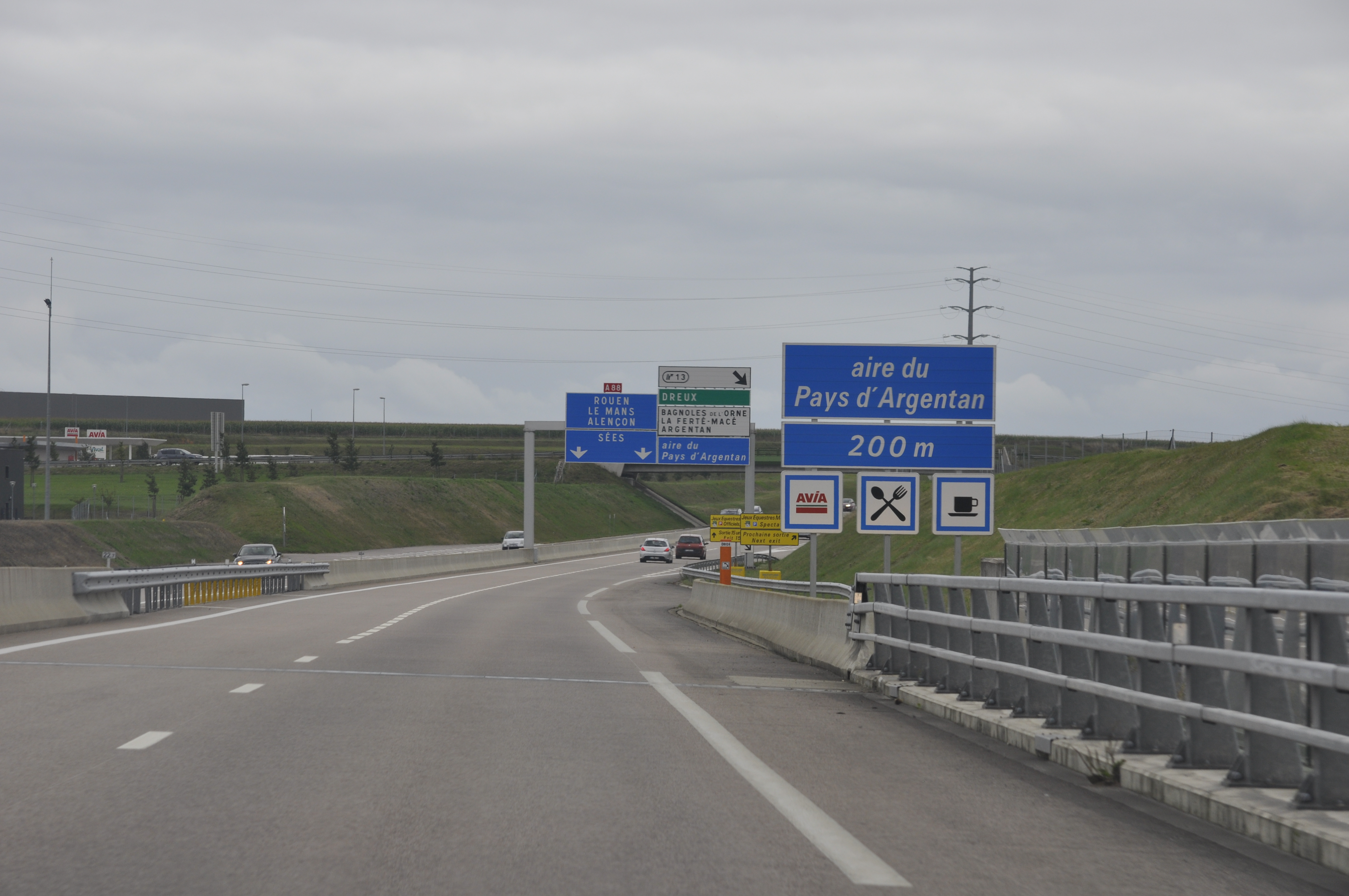

Route information
- Length: 142 km (88 mi)
- Existed: 2002–present

Major junctions
- North end: E60 / A 11 in Écouflant

- E3 / A 83 in Essarts

- South end: D 165 in La Roche-sur-Yon

Location
- Country: France
- Major cities: Cholet

Highway system
- Roads in France; Autoroutes; Routes nationales
← A 86	→ A 88

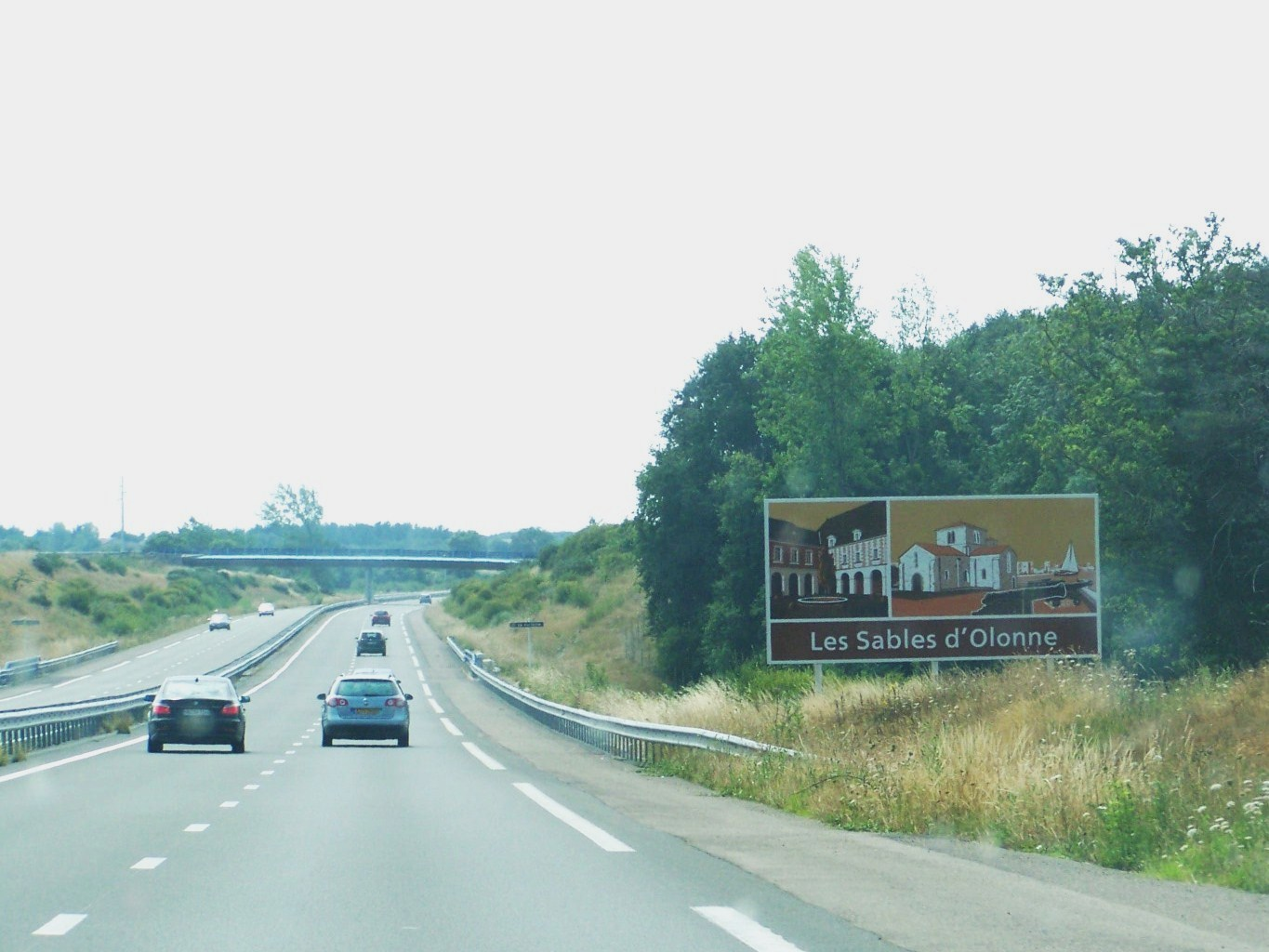
Sign announcing Les Sables d'Olonne on the motorway A87 in Vendée.

The A87 autoroute is a motorway in western France. It connects Angers with the coast and western north–south motorway the A83. It is 141.9 km (88.2 mi) long.

== List of exits and junctions ==
Region	Department	Junction	Destinations	Notes
Pays de la Loire	Maine-et-Loire	A11 - A87 + 14 : Gâtignolle	Rennes, Nantes, Angers - centre, Paris, Le Mans, Saumur, Tours	
Pays de la Loire	Maine-et-Loire	A11 - A87 + 14 : Gâtignolle	Tiercé, Écouflant	Entry and exit from Les Sables-d'Olonnes
Pays de la Loire	Maine-et-Loire	15 : Parc des Expositions	Angers - est, Verrières-en-Anjou, Z.A. Pôle 49	
Pays de la Loire	Maine-et-Loire	16 : La Bouvinerie	Le Plessis-Grammoire, Saint-Barthélemy-d'Anjou - Z.I, Z. A. Pôle 49	
Pays de la Loire	Maine-et-Loire	17 : Saint-Barthélemy-d'Anjou	Saumur, Beaufort-en-Anjou, Saint-Barthélemy-d'Anjou - centre	
Pays de la Loire	Maine-et-Loire	18a : Angers - centre	Angers - centre	
Pays de la Loire	Maine-et-Loire	18b : Angers - sud	Angers, Clinique de l'Anjou, Parking Relais Tramway (La Roseraie)	Entry and exit from Paris
Pays de la Loire	Maine-et-Loire	19 : La Foucaudière	Trélazé - Z. I.	
Pays de la Loire	Maine-et-Loire	20 : La Monnaie	Angers - sud, centre, Clinique de l'Anjou, Parking Relais Tramway (La Roseraie)	
Pays de la Loire	Maine-et-Loire	21 : Sorges	Les Ponts-de-Cé, Sainte-Gemmes-sur-Loire, Bouchemaine, Moulin Marcille	
Pays de la Loire	Maine-et-Loire	22/22a/22b : Haute-Perche	Poitiers, Niort, Brissac Loire Aubance, Mûrs-Erigné - Loire, Doué-en-Anjou, Les Ponts-de-Cé	
Pays de la Loire	Maine-et-Loire	22.1 : Grand Clos	Mûrs-Erigné - centre	Entry and exit from Angers and entry to Les Sables-d'Olonnes
Pays de la Loire	Maine-et-Loire	23 : Mûrs-Erigné	Cholet, Chemillé-en-Anjou, Mûrs-Erigné - Aubance	
Pays de la Loire	Maine-et-Loire	24 : Thouarcé	Bellevigne-en-Layon, Chalonnes-sur-Loire	
Pays de la Loire	Maine-et-Loire	Péage de Beaulieu-sur-Layon		
Pays de la Loire	Maine-et-Loire	25 : Chemillé-en-Anjou	Beaupréau-en-Mauges, Lys-Haut-Layon, Chalonnes-sur-Loire, Chemillé-en-Anjou	
Pays de la Loire	Maine-et-Loire	Aire de Trémentines		
Pays de la Loire	Maine-et-Loire	26 : Cholet - nord	Saumur, Cholet - centre, Lys-Haut-Layon	
Pays de la Loire	Maine-et-Loire	27 : Cholet - sud	Poitiers, Nantes, Niort par RD, Cholet - centre, Mauléon, Mortagne-sur-Sèvre, Bressuire	
Pays de la Loire	Vendée	28 : La Verrie	Pouzauges, Mortagne-sur-Sèvre, Chanverrie, Le Puy du Fou	
Pays de la Loire	Vendée	29 : Les Herbiers	Les Herbiers	
Pays de la Loire	Vendée	29 : Les Herbiers	Aire des Herbiers	
Pays de la Loire	Vendée	A83 - A87	Bordeaux, La Rochelle, Niort, Les Essarts, Nantes	
Pays de la Loire	Vendée	Péage de La Roche-sur-Yon		
Pays de la Loire	Vendée	30 : La Roche-sur-Yon - est	La Roche-sur-Yon - nord, La Roche-sur-Yon - centre, Nantes, Cholet par RD, Noirmoutier, La Chaize-le-Vicomte, Saint-Gilles - Saint-Hilaire, Niort (A83)	
Pays de la Loire	Vendée	31 : La Roche-sur-Yon - centre	Luçon, La Rochelle, La Roche-sur-Yon - Le Bourg-sous-la-Roche	
Pays de la Loire	Vendée	32 : La Roche-sur-Yon - sud	La Tranche-sur-Mer, Aubigny-Les Clouzeaux, La Roche-sur-Yon	
Pays de la Loire	Vendée	33 : La Roche-sur-Yon - ouest	Aubigny-Les Clouzeaux, La Roche-sur-Yon - Saint-André-d'Ornay, Venansault, La Roche-sur-Yon - nord, La Roche-sur-Yon - centre, Nantes	
A 87 becomes D 165
1.000 mi = 1.609 km; 1.000 km = 0.621 mi
