= Route nationale 1 =

Trunk road in France

The Route nationale 1 is a trunk road (nationale) in France between Paris and Calais. It is approximately 339 km (211 mi) long.

== Reclassification ==
The majority of the original road has been superseded by the A16 autoroute. As a result, much of the road has now been reclassified the RD 1001, RD 901 and RD 940.

== Route ==
Paris - Saint-Denis - Beauvais - Amiens - Abbeville - Boulogne-sur-Mer - Calais - Dunkerque - Belgium

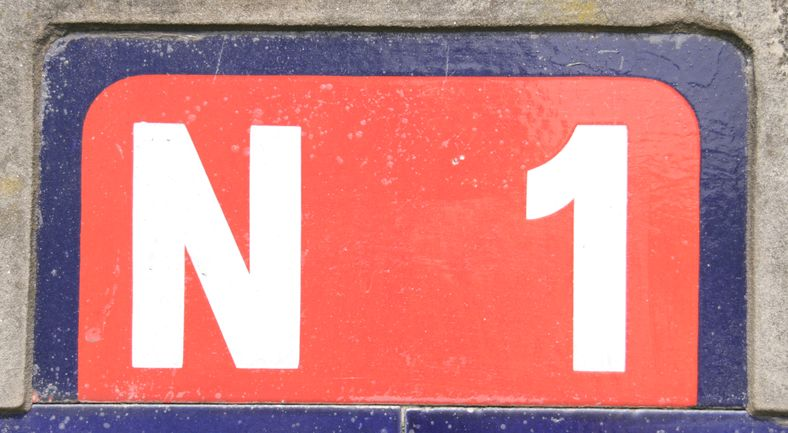

=== Paris to Amiens (0 km to 130 km) ===
The road begins at the Porte de la Chapelle in Paris and runs below the A1 autoroute as the Boulevard de President Wilson north through the northern Paris suburbs to Saint-Denis. The road heads through Saint Denis as the Avenue Lenine before heading north east. The road then heads to the east of Saint Brice Sous Foret, with the Foret Dominiale de Montmorency.

The road heads into the Foret Dominiale de L'Isle-Adam where the A16 autoroute starts, and then crosses the River Oise. The autoroute heads to the west while the N 1 heads out over rolling countryside northwards after Chambly. The road heads through Noailles before the road crosses the autoroute and enters Beauvais.

The road passes round the east of Beauvais passing the airport before turning north east. The road heads over the generally flat countryside to Breteuil. It runs parallel to the A 16 and enters the town of Amiens from the South. The road crosses the River Somme in the town.

=== Amiens to Calais (130 km to 290 km) ===
In Amiens the road turns north west along the Somme valley past the memorial Samara. The road heads out of the steep valley sides before the town of Abbeville. To the west of the town is the A28 autoroute which heads south to Rouen.

The N 1 heads north again passing south west of the Forêt de Crécy. The road then crosses the marshy valley of the river Authie. The countryside becomes a series of chalk downland and deep valleys. The road continues to the valley of the Canche and the historic walled town of Montreuil. The road rises again reaching 134 m above sea level north of the town which offers views over the Parc Naturel Regional caps et Marais D'Opale. The road passes through the village of Samer before turning north west to the major port and historic town of Boulogne-sur-Mer.

After Boulogne the road has reached the English Channel and the road heads along the coast past the Colonne de la Grande Armée and has now been re-numbered the RD 940. The road heads through Wimereux and close to the Cap Gris-Nez (50 m), Wissant and the Cap Blanc-Nez (134 m), here the road passes a Monument to Latham and past the Mont d'Hubert (151 m). The road then enters Calais from the west. The town is a major port with ferry services to England. The A26 autoroute starts in the town heading south east to Paris, Lille and Reims.

=== Calais to Frontier of Belgium (290 km to 339 km) ===
In the year 1973 the RN 1 took over this part from the RN 40. 2006 this part was downgraded from RN to RD. The A16 autoroute passes round the town with the Eurotunnel terminal and heading north to the Belgium frontier and takes the majority of through traffic. The old RN 1 is now numbered the RD 940 and passes north east parallel to the coast across flat drained farmland. The road reaches the river Aa and the town of Gravelines after 25 km.

After the town the road is numbered the RN 1 and it passes a series of refineries and other industrial complexes in the Zone industrielle Portuaire. The road then enters the port of Dunkerque where the RN 225 (European Route E 42) heads south east to Lille. The RN 1 continues along the coast to the Frontier with Belgium where it continues as the N 39.
