= Bidovce =

Village and municipality in Slovakia

- Municipality
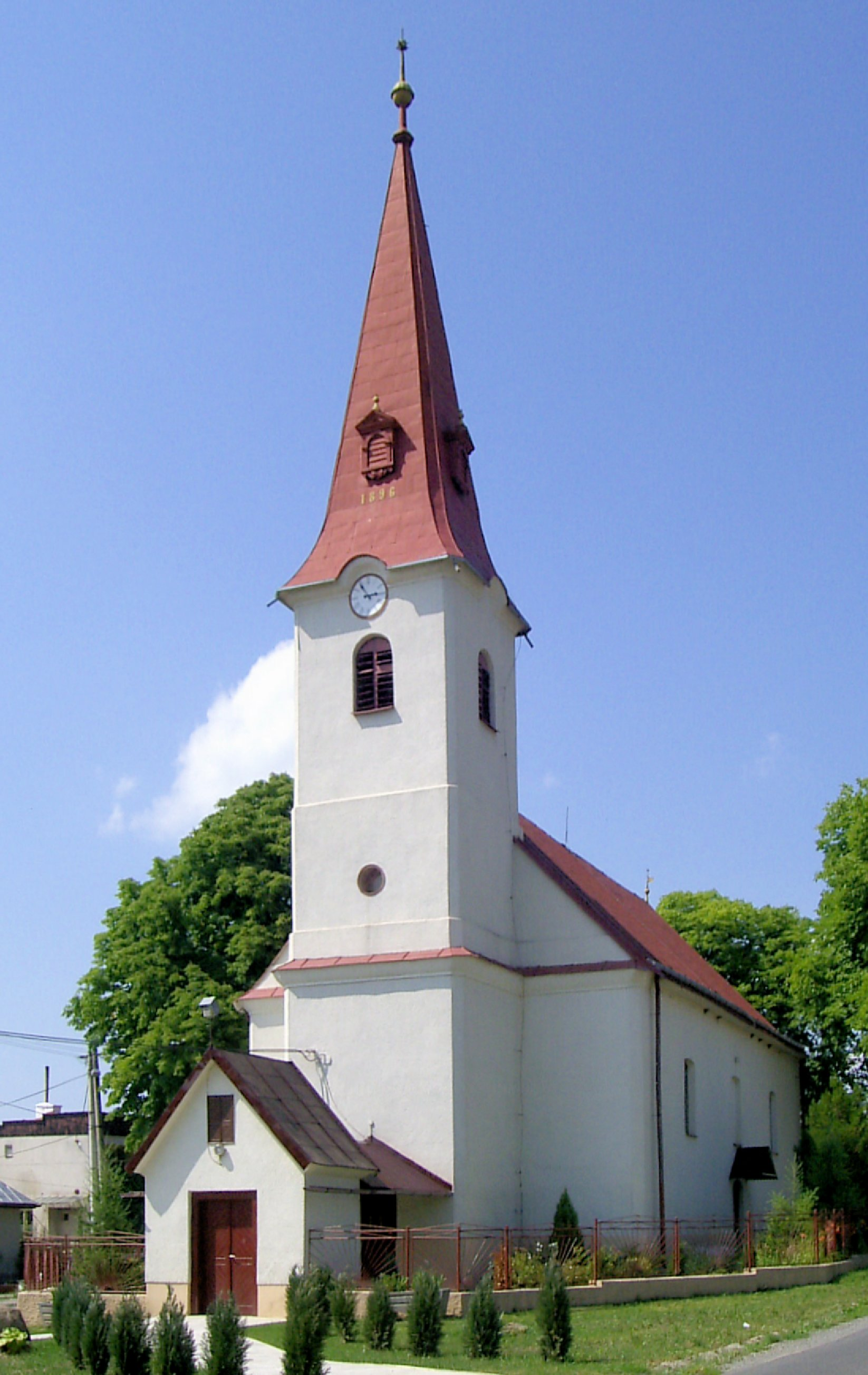

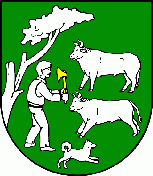
- Flag Coat of arms

- Location of Bidovce in the Košice Region Location of Bidovce in Slovakia
- Coordinates: 48.73°N 21.43°E
- Country: Slovakia
- Region: Košice Region
- District: Košice-okolie District
- First mentioned: 1276

Area
  - Total: 9.81 km^{2} (3.79 sq mi)
- Elevation: 249 m (817 ft)

Population (2025)
  - Total: 1,716
- Time zone: UTC+1 (CET)
  - Summer (DST): UTC+2 (CEST)
- Postal code: 444 5
- Area code: +421 55
- Vehicle registration plate (until 2022): KS
- Website: www.bidovce.sk

Bidovce (Hungarian: Magyarbőd, until 1899: Bőd) is a village and municipality in Košice-okolie District in the Kosice Region of Slovakia.

== Geography ==
The municipality lies at an altitude of 249 metres (817 ft) and covers an area of 9.81 km^{2} (3.79 sq mi) (2025).

== Population ==
Population statistic (10 years)
Year	1995	2005	2015	2025
Count	1089	1207	1508	1716
Difference		+10.83%	+24.93%	+13.79%

Population statistic
Year	2024	2025
Count	1702	1716
Difference		+0.82%

It has a population of 1716 people (31 December 2025).

=== Ethnicity ===
Census 2021 (1+%)
Ethnicity	Number	Fraction
Slovak	1565	96.07%
Romani	279	17.12%
Not found out	58	3.56%
Hungarian	38	2.33%
Total	1629	

In year 2021 was 1629 people by ethnicity 1565 as Slovak, 279 as Romani, 58 as Not found out, 38 as Hungarian, 11 as Other, 8 as Rusyn, 6 as Czech, 3 as Russian, 2 as Canadian and 1 as Jewish.

Note on population: The difference values of population numbers in the table "Population statistic" and in the sections "Ethnicity" & "Religion" is caused by the use of various statistical methods.

=== Religion ===
Census 2021 (1+%)
Religion	Number	Fraction
None	513	31.49%
Roman Catholic Church	469	28.79%
Calvinist Church	396	24.31%
Evangelical Church	90	5.52%
Greek Catholic Church	74	4.54%
Not found out	34	2.09%
Jehovah's Witnesses	27	1.66%
Total	1629	

In year 2021 was 1629 people by religion 513 from None, 469 from Roman Catholic Church, 396 from Calvinist Church, 90 from Evangelical Church, 74 from Greek Catholic Church, 34 from Not found out, 27 from Jehovah's Witnesses, 11 from Eastern Orthodox Church, 6 from Apostolic Church, 4 from Ad hoc movements, 3 from Paganism and natural spirituality and 2 from United Methodist Church.

== Genealogical resources ==
The records for genealogical research are available at the state archive "Statny Archiv in Kosice, Slovakia"

- Roman Catholic church records (births/marriages/deaths): 1789-1918 (parish B)
- Greek Catholic church records (births/marriages/deaths): 1788-1912 (parish B)
- Lutheran church records (births/marriages/deaths): 1776-1898 (parish B)
- Reformated church records (births/marriages/deaths): 1737-1897 (parish A)

== See also ==
- List of municipalities and towns in Slovakia
