= European route E604 =

Road in trans-European E-road network

E604

Route information
- Length: 128 km (80 mi)

Major junctions
- From: Tours
- To: Vierzon

Location
- Countries: France

Highway system
- International E-road network; A Class; B Class

European route E 604 is a European B class road in France, connecting the cities Tours and Vierzon.

== Route ==
- France
  - E05, E60, E502 Tours
  - E11 Vierzon
