= European route E601 =

Road in trans-European E-road network

E601

Route information
- Length: 61 km (38 mi)

Major junctions
- From: near Niort
- To: La Rochelle

Location
- Countries: France

Highway system
- International E-road network; A Class; B Class

European route E 601 is a European B class road in France, connecting the cities Niort and La Rochelle.

== Route ==
- France
  - Niort
  - E03, E602 La Rochelle
