= Corzé =

- Commune
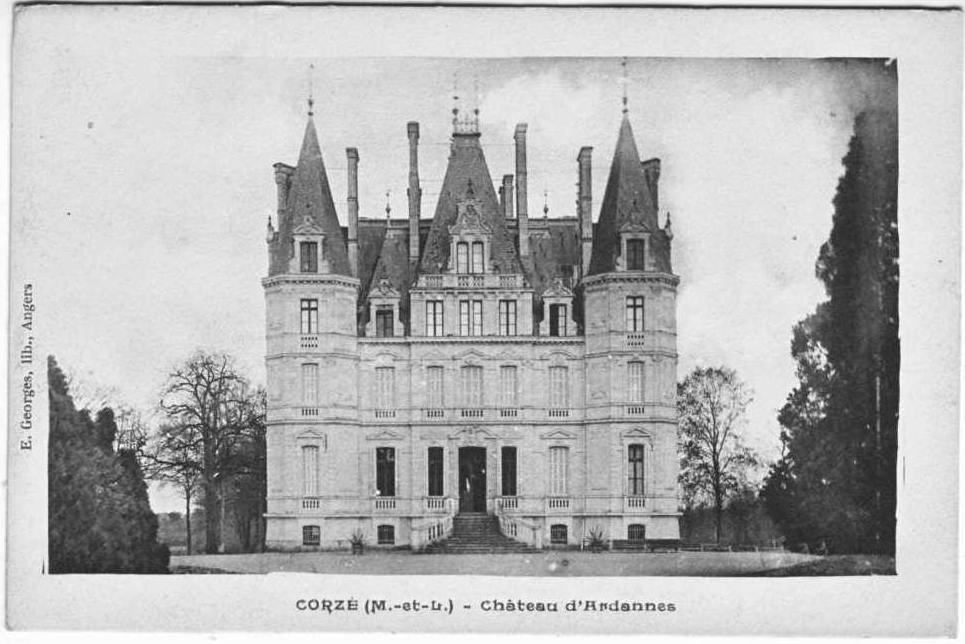
- The château of Ardannes

- Coat of arms
- Location of Corzé
- Location within France Location within Pays de la Loire
- Coordinates: 47°33′37″N 0°23′24″W
- Country: France
- Region: Pays de la Loire
- Department: Maine-et-Loire
- Arrondissement: Angers
- Canton: Angers-6

Government
  - Mayor (2020–2026): Jean-Philippe Guilleux
- Area^{1}: 31.49 km^{2} (12.16 sq mi)
- Elevation: 24 m (79 ft)
- Highest elevation: 68 m (223 ft)
- Lowest elevation: 15 m (49 ft)
- Population (2023): 1,991
  - Density: 63.23/km^{2} (163.8/sq mi)
- Demonym(s): Corzéen, Corzéenne
- Time zone: UTC+01:00 (CET)
  - Summer (DST): UTC+02:00 (CEST)
- INSEE/Postal code: 49110 /49140
- ^{1} French Land Register data, which excludes lakes, ponds, glaciers > 1 km^{2} (0.386 sq mi or 247 acres) and river estuaries.

Corzé (French pronunciation: [kɔʁze]) is a commune in the Maine-et-Loire department in western France.

== See also ==
- Communes of the Maine-et-Loire department
