= La Gravelle =

- Commune
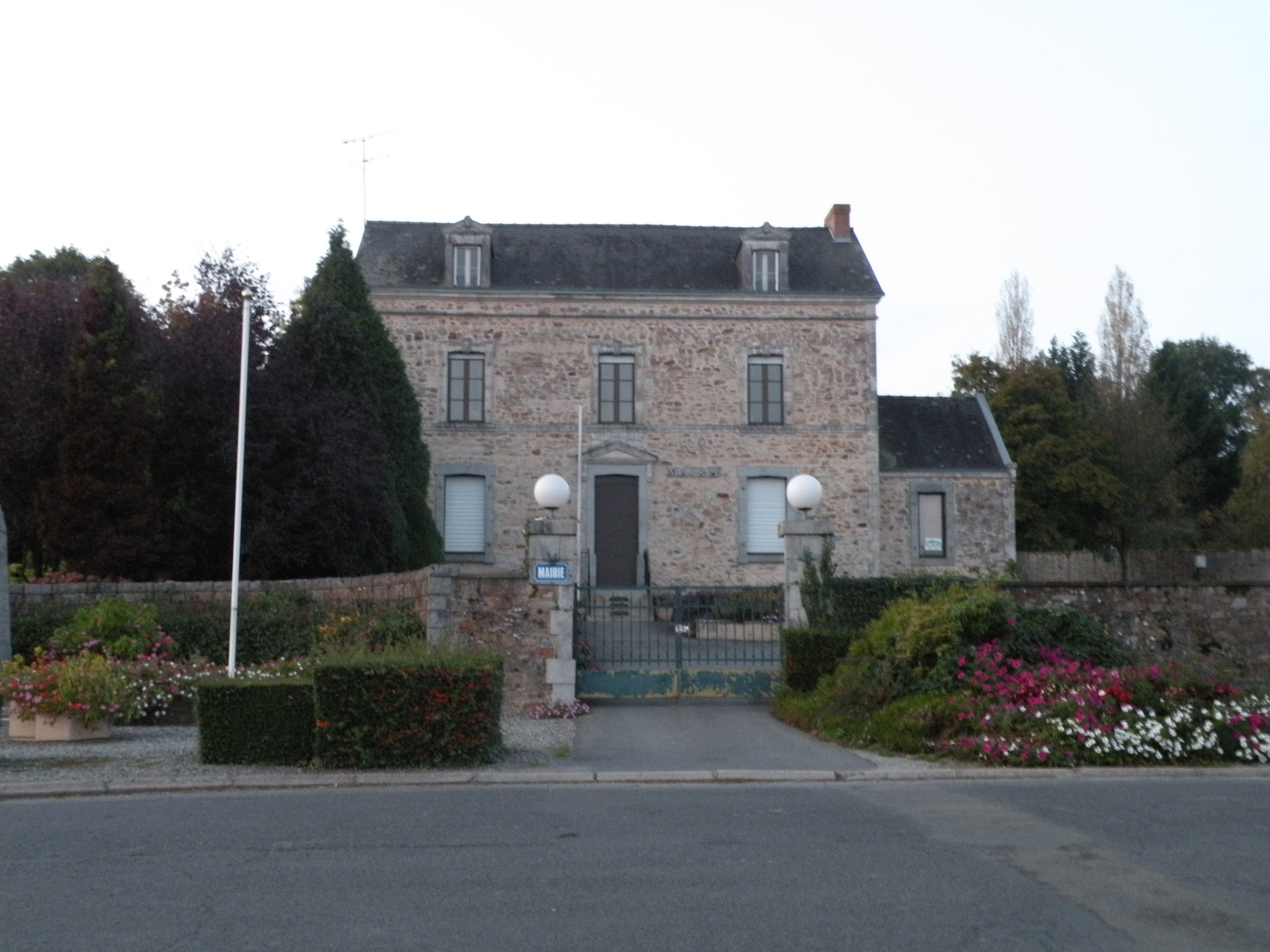
- The town hall of La Gravelle
- Location of La Gravelle
- Location within France Location within Pays de la Loire
- Coordinates: 48°04′24″N 1°00′52″W
- Country: France
- Region: Pays de la Loire
- Department: Mayenne
- Arrondissement: Laval
- Canton: Loiron-Ruillé
- Intercommunality: Laval Agglomération

Government
  - Mayor (2020–2026): Nicolas Deulofeu
- Area^{1}: 6.23 km^{2} (2.41 sq mi)
- Elevation: 163 m (535 ft)
- Highest elevation: 192 m (630 ft)
- Lowest elevation: 135 m (443 ft)
- Population (2023): 557
  - Density: 89.4/km^{2} (232/sq mi)
- Time zone: UTC+01:00 (CET)
  - Summer (DST): UTC+02:00 (CEST)
- INSEE/Postal code: 53108 /53410
- ^{1} French Land Register data, which excludes lakes, ponds, glaciers > 1 km^{2} (0.386 sq mi or 247 acres) and river estuaries.

La Gravelle (French pronunciation: [la ɡʁavɛl]) is a commune in the Mayenne department in north-western France.

== Geography ==
The river Oudon has its source in the commune.

== See also ==
- Communes of the Mayenne department
