= European route E502 =

Road in trans-European E-road network

E502

Route information
- Length: 98 km (61 mi)

Major junctions
- From: Le Mans
- To: Tours

Location
- Countries: France

Highway system
- International E-road network; A Class; B Class

E 502 is a European B class road in France, connecting the cities Le Mans – Tours.

== Route ==
- France
  - E50, E402 E501 Le Mans
  - E05, E60, E604 Tours
