= European route E402 =

Road in trans-European E-road network

E402

Route information
- Length: 424 km (263 mi)

Major junctions
- From: Calais
- Rouen
- To: Le Mans

Location
- Countries: France

Highway system
- International E-road network; A Class; B Class

European route E 402 is a European B class road in France, connecting the cities Calais, Rouen and Le Mans.

== Route ==
- France
  - E15, E40 Calais
  - E46 Rouen
  - E50, E501, E502 Le Mans
