= Ablis =

- Commune
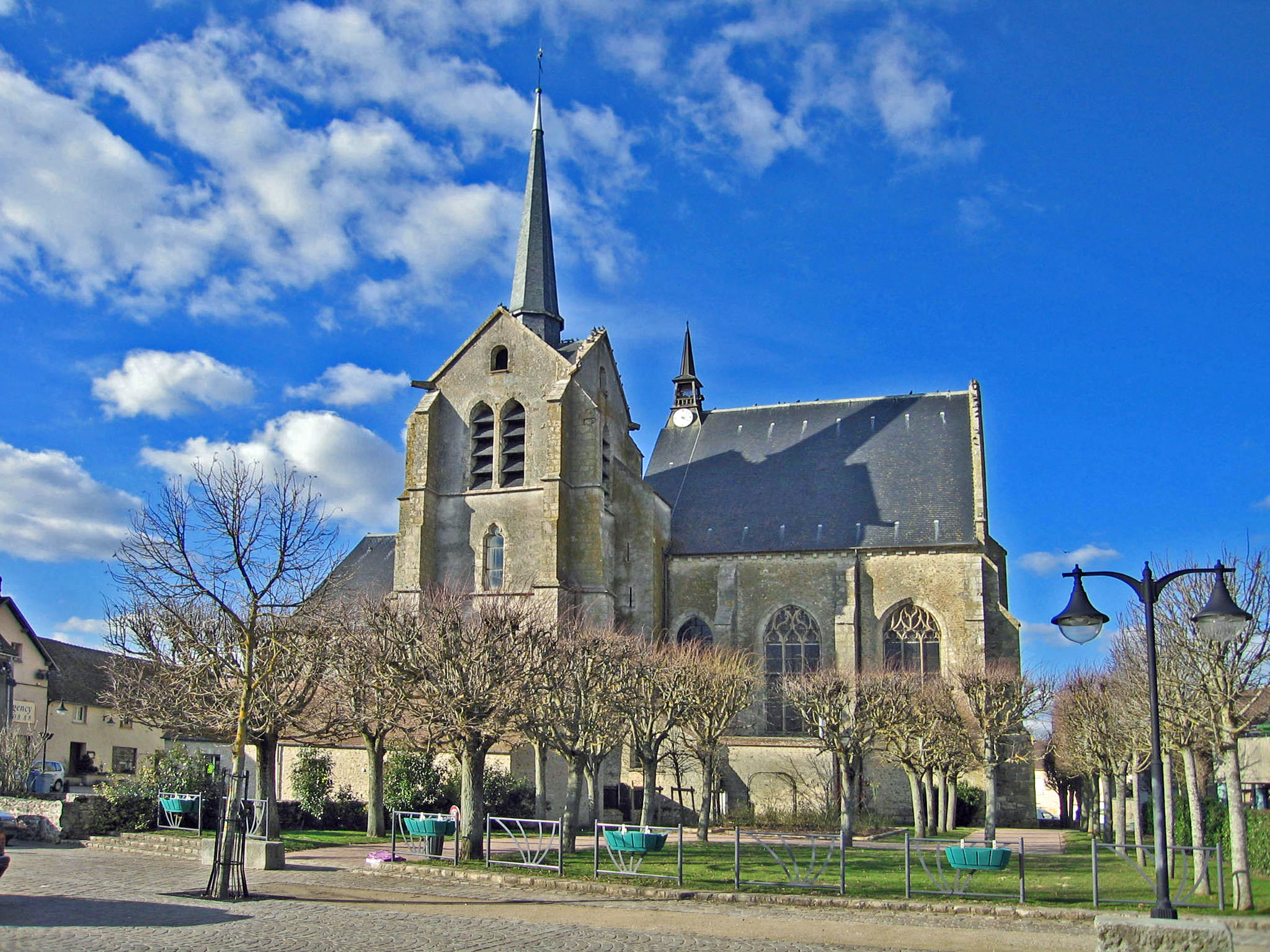
- The church of Saint-Pierre, in Ablis

- Coat of arms
- Location of Ablis
- Location within France Location within Île-de-France (region)
- Coordinates: 48°31′02″N 1°50′11″E
- Country: France
- Region: Île-de-France
- Department: Yvelines
- Arrondissement: Rambouillet
- Canton: Rambouillet
- Intercommunality: CA Rambouillet Territoires

Government
  - Mayor (2020–2026): Jean-François Siret
- Area^{1}: 25.92 km^{2} (10.01 sq mi)
- Elevation: 151 m (495 ft)
- Highest elevation: 164 m (538 ft)
- Lowest elevation: 132 m (433 ft)
- Population (2023): 3,913
  - Density: 151.0/km^{2} (391.0/sq mi)
- Demonym(s): Ablisiens, Ablisiennes
- Time zone: UTC+01:00 (CET)
  - Summer (DST): UTC+02:00 (CEST)
- INSEE/Postal code: 78003 /78660
- ^{1} French Land Register data, which excludes lakes, ponds, glaciers > 1 km^{2} (0.386 sq mi or 247 acres) and river estuaries.

Ablis (French pronunciation: [abli]) is a commune in the Yvelines department in north-central France.

== History ==
During the Franco-Prussian War, when a German unit moved to take Ablis on October 7, 1870, they were ambushed and routed by about 1,500 French militia soldiers who were supported by the citizens of Ablis. In revenge, a German cavalry division subsequently torched Ablis.

== Population ==
Historical population

| Year | Pop. | ±% p.a. |
|---|---|---|
| 1793 | 1,150 | — |
| 1800 | 790 | −5.22% |
| 1806 | 809 | +0.40% |
| 1821 | 966 | +1.19% |
| 1831 | 901 | −0.69% |
| 1836 | 903 | +0.04% |
| 1841 | 964 | +1.32% |
| 1846 | 1,009 | +0.92% |
| 1851 | 964 | −0.91% |
| 1856 | 970 | +0.12% |
| 1861 | 934 | −0.75% |
| 1866 | 1,001 | +1.40% |
| 1872 | 898 | −1.79% |
| 1876 | 883 | −0.42% |
| 1881 | 879 | −0.09% |
| 1886 | 965 | +1.88% |
| 1891 | 1,006 | +0.84% |
| 1896 | 1,008 | +0.04% |
| 1901 | 991 | −0.34% |

| Year | Pop. | ±% p.a. |
|---|---|---|
| 1906 | 985 | −0.12% |
| 1911 | 996 | +0.22% |
| 1921 | 950 | −0.47% |
| 1926 | 981 | +0.64% |
| 1931 | 958 | −0.47% |
| 1936 | 986 | +0.58% |
| 1946 | 1,099 | +1.09% |
| 1954 | 1,014 | −1.00% |
| 1962 | 1,034 | +0.24% |
| 1968 | 1,100 | +1.04% |
| 1975 | 1,115 | +0.19% |
| 1982 | 1,367 | +2.95% |
| 1990 | 2,033 | +5.09% |
| 1999 | 2,705 | +3.22% |
| 2007 | 3,201 | +2.13% |
| 2012 | 3,255 | +0.34% |
| 2017 | 3,439 | +1.11% |
| 2023 | 3,913 | +2.18% |

Source: EHESS (1793-1999) and INSEE

== Twin towns ==
Ablis is twinned with Wendelsheim (Germany).
