= European route E501 =

Road in trans-European E-road network

E501

Route information
- Length: 97 km (60 mi)

Major junctions
- From: Le Mans
- To: Angers

Location
- Countries: France

Highway system
- International E-road network; A Class; B Class

E501 is a European B class road in France, connecting the cities Le Mans and Angers.

== Routes and E-road junctions ==
- France
  - Le Mans: E50, E402, E502
  - Angers
