= European route E44 =

Road in trans-European E-road network

E44

Route information
- Length: 807 km (501 mi)

Major junctions
- West end: Le Havre, France
- East end: Giessen, Germany

Location
- Countries: France; Luxembourg; Germany

Highway system
- International E-road network; A Class; B Class

European route E44 is an intermediate E-road. Its route is Le Havre – Amiens – Charleville-Mézières – Luxembourg – Trier – Koblenz – Wetzlar – Gießen
