= Sillé-le-Guillaume =

- Commune
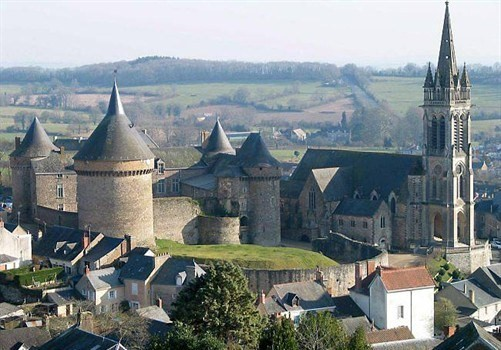
- The château and the church of Notre-Dame

- Coat of arms
- Location of Sillé-le-Guillaume
- Location within France Location within Pays de la Loire
- Coordinates: 48°11′03″N 0°07′41″W
- Country: France
- Region: Pays de la Loire
- Department: Sarthe
- Arrondissement: Mamers
- Canton: Sillé-le-Guillaume
- Intercommunality: Champagne Conlinoise et Pays de Sillé

Government
  - Mayor (2020–2026): Gérard Galpin
- Area^{1}: 12.90 km^{2} (4.98 sq mi)
- Highest elevation: 260 m (850 ft)
- Lowest elevation: 115 m (377 ft)
- Population (2023): 2,195
  - Density: 170.2/km^{2} (440.7/sq mi)
- Demonym: Silléens
- Time zone: UTC+01:00 (CET)
  - Summer (DST): UTC+02:00 (CEST)
- INSEE/Postal code: 72334 /72140
- Website: www.sille-le-guillaume.fr
- ^{1} French Land Register data, which excludes lakes, ponds, glaciers > 1 km^{2} (0.386 sq mi or 247 acres) and river estuaries.

Sillé-le-Guillaume (French pronunciation: [sije lə ɡijom]) is a commune in the Sarthe department in the region of Pays de la Loire in north-western France, named after Guillaume de Sillé.

In the fifteenth century the lord of the manor was Sir John Fastolf of Caister in Norfolk (1380–1459), following the English conquest of Normandy and Maine.

== Population ==
Historical population
Year	Pop.	±% p.a.
1968	2,528	—
1975	2,777	+1.35%
1982	2,863	+0.44%
1990	2,583	−1.28%
1999	2,585	+0.01%
2007	2,358	−1.14%
2012	2,375	+0.14%
2017	2,305	−0.60%
2023	2,195	−0.81%
Source: INSEE

== See also ==
- Communes of the Sarthe department
- Parc naturel régional Normandie-Maine
