= European route E46 =

Road in trans-European E-road network

E46

Route information
- Length: 753 km (468 mi)

Major junctions
- West end: Cherbourg-en-Cotentin
- East end: Liège, Belgium

Location
- Countries: France; Belgium

Highway system
- International E-road network; A Class; B Class

European route E46 forms part of the International E-road network. The route runs from Cherbourg-en-Cotentin, France, to Liège, Belgium. It is 753 km (468 mi) long.

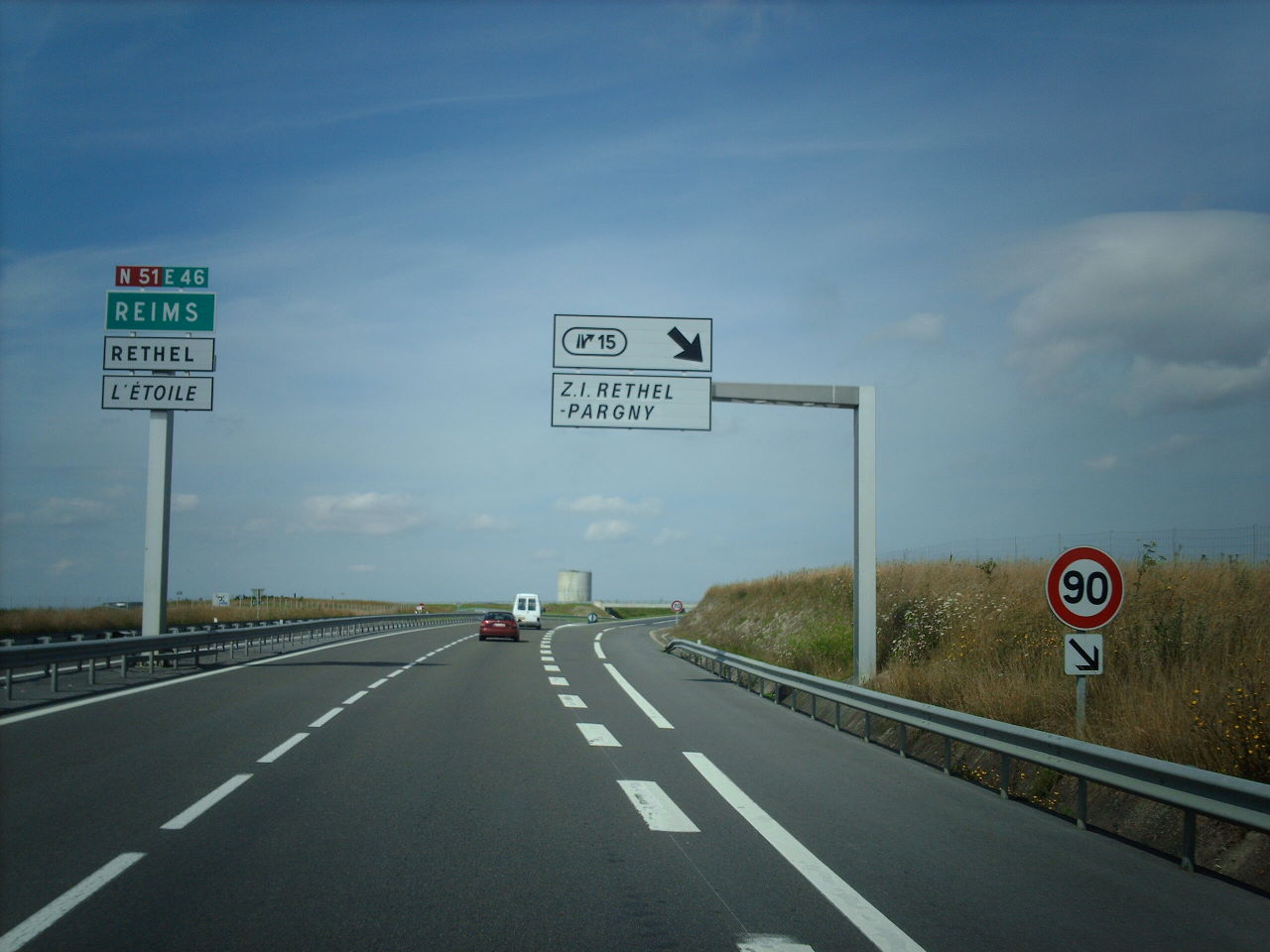
E 46 near Rethel in France

== Route ==
Cherbourg-Octeville - Caen - Rouen - Beauvais - Compiegne - Soissons - Reims - Charleville-Mézières - Liège
