= European route E5 in France =

The European route E5 in France is a series of roads, part of the International E-road network, running from the portal city of Le Havre in northwestern France towards the border with Spain in Hendaye. The E5 originates in Scotland and crosses the English Channel near Southampton. It continues to southern Spain.

== Route ==
The E5 in France starts in the major port city of Le Havre, Normandy arriving on a non-existing ferry from Southampton, United Kingdom. It follows the N282 until the outskirts of the city, where the A131 starts until it joins the A13 motorway. It passes the capital of Normandy Rouen before arriving in the western suburbs of the French capital of Paris. Paris is passed using the Boulevard Périphérique (ring road) from the Porte d'Auteuil to the Porte d'Orléans. There the E5 shortly follows the A6 through the southern neighbourhoods of Paris, before entering the A10 motorway due south. The A10 continues southwest to the major city of Bordeaux, passing several large cities like Orléans, Blois, Tours, Châtellerault, Poitiers, Niort and Saintes, to end at the Bordeaux ring road. The E5 bypasses the city on the east side, before continuing further south using the A63 motorway. This motorway traverses the sparsely populated Landes de Gascogne Regional Natural Park, to reach the coastal cities of Bayonne and Biarritz and finally ends at the Spanish border near Hendaye. It continues south towards San Sebastián and Madrid to end at Algeciras. The E5 passes through four regions (Normandy, Île-de-France, Centre-Val de Loire and Nouvelle-Aquitaine) as well as 15 departments and the city of Paris. The E5 is a toll road at the Tancarville Bridge, between Bourneville-Sainte-Croix and Buchelay on the A13 as an open toll system, from Saint-Arnoult-en-Yvelines to Monnaie and from Sorigny to Virsac on the A10 as a closed system, and from Saugnacq-et-Muret to Biriatou on the A63 as an open system. The road covers a total distance of 985 km (612 mi) in France.

== Detailed route ==
E5 Le Havre – Hendaye
Department	National road number	Section	Junction	Northbound destinations	Southbound destinations
(United Kingdom) (England)	Sea route Southampton – Le Havre	United Kingdom towards Southampton, Oxford and Birmingham			
(European Union) (France) Normandy Seine-Maritime	National Route 282	Le Havre – Gonfreville	Le Havre D6015, E44 Rouen, Amiens, Fécamp, Dieppe, Harfleur, Gonfreville-l'Orcher, Montivilliers (only southbound) Port of Le Havre (only southbound) Gonfreville-l'Orcher, Mayville (only northbound) D6382 Le Havre-Sud, Port of Le Havre, Le Havre – Octeville Airport, Montivilliers (only northbound)	United Kingdom Le Havre	Paris Rouen
(European Union) (France) Normandy Seine-Maritime	A131 motorway	Gonfreville- – Tancarville	A29, E44 Rouen-Nord, Amiens, Caen, Lisieux, Port of Le Havre, Rogerville Port of Le Havre 32 Lillebonne, Port Jérôme Industrial Zone	United Kingdom Le Havre	Paris Rouen
(European Union) (France) Normandy Seine-Maritime	National Route 182 Tancarville Bridge	Tancarville – Marais-Vernier	31 Tancarville Péage du Pont de Tancarville	United Kingdom Le Havre	Paris Rouen
Eure	A131 motorway	Marais-Vernier – Bourneville	30 D178 Évreux, Beuzeville 29 D810, D87 Alençon, Pont-Audemer, Quillebeuf-sur-Seine 28 D139 Pont-Audemer, Bourneville-Sainte-Croix, Le Perrey (only southbound) Péage de Bourneville-Sainte-Croix A13, E46 Le Havre, Caen, Deauville, Rennes, Rouen, Paris (only northbound)	United Kingdom Le Havre	Paris Rouen
Eure	A13 motorway L'Autoroute de Normandie	Bourneville – St-Ouen-de-Thouberville	26 D89 Bourneville-Sainte-Croix, Pont-Audemer, Brionne, Valletot Aire d'Eturqueraye (only southbound) Aire de Rougemontiers (only northbound) 25 D313 Bourg-Achard, Yvetot, Grand-Bourgtheroulde A28, E402 Bernay, Alençon, Le Mans, Nantes, Tours, Bordeaux Aire de Bosgouet 24 D438 Grand-Bourgtheroulde, Caumont, Grand-Couronne, Saint-Ouen-de-Thouberville	Rennes Caen Le Havre	Paris Rouen
Seine-Maritime	A13 motorway L'Autoroute de Normandie	Saint-Ouen-de-Thouberville – Rouen	23 N138 Rouen-Centre, Elbeuf, Grand-Couronne, Le Grand-Quevilly (only southbound) A139 Rouen-Centre, Elbeuf, Grand-Couronne, Le Grand-Quevilly (only northbound)	Rennes Caen Le Havre	Paris Rouen
Seine-Maritime	A13 motorway L'Autoroute de Normandie	Rouen – Sotteville-sous-le-Val	22 D18E, E46, E402 Rouen-Est, Amiens, Calais, Reims, Beauvais, Dieppe, Oissel, Saint-Étienne-du-Rouvray, Sotteville-lès-Rouen 21 D7 Elbeuf, Oissel, Tourville-la-Rivière, Cléon, Le Neubourg	Caen Le Havre Rouen	Paris
Eure	A13 motorway L'Autoroute de Normandie	Sotteville-sous-le-Val – Blaru	20 D321 Elbeuf-Est, Pont-de-l'Arche, Val-de-Reuil, Criquebeuf-sur-Seine Aire de Bord 19 A154 Évreux, Orléans, Dreux, Chartres, Val-de-Reuil, Louviers Aire de Vironvay Péage de Heudebouville 18 D6155 Louviers, Heudebouville, Fontaine-Bellenger (only northbound) 17 D316 Gaillon, Les Andelys, Évreux, Le Val-d'Hazey, Saint-Julien-de-la-Liègue Aire de Beauchêne 16 D181 Vernon, Pacy-sur-Eure, La Heunière	Caen Le Havre Rouen	Paris
(European Union) Île-de-France Yvelines	A13 motorway L'Autoroute de Normandie	Blaru – Le Chesnay	15 N13, D113 Évreux, Pacy-sur-Eure, Chaufour-lès-Bonnières, Bonnières-sur-Seine, Freneuse Aire de La Villeneuve-en-Chevrie 14 A13a Vernon, Bonnières-sur-Seine, Freneuse, Bennecourt (only northbound) Aire de Rosny-sur-Seine Péage du Buchelay 13 Mantes-la-Jolie-Ouest, Vernon, Évreux, Rosny-sur-Seine, Buchelay (only northbound) 12 D928 Mantes-la-Jolie-Sud, Magnanville, Dreux, Limay, Mantes-la-Ville 11 D983 Mantes-la-Jolie-Est, Mantes-la-Ville, Limay, Guerville, Septeuil, Magny-en-Vexin 10 D130 Rambouillet, Plaisir, Épône, Mézières-sur-Seine, Gargenville Aire d'Épône 9 D14 Aubergenville, Flins-sur-Seine, Les Mureaux 8 D43, D44 Les Mureaux, Meulan-en-Yvelines, Bouafle, Ecquevilly, Chapet, Verneuil-sur-Seine Aire de Morainvilliers 7 D153, D113 Poissy, Saint-Germain-en-Laye, Nanterre, La Défense, Plaisir, Orgeval, Villennes-sur-Seine, Achères, Cergy-Pontoise A14 Paris-Nord, Nanterre, La Défense, Saint-Germain-en-Laye, Saint-Denis, Neuilly-sur-Seine A12 Trappes, Montigny-le-Bretonneux, Évry, Rambouillet, Bois-d'Arcy, Versailles-Satory, Lyon 6 N186, D186 Versailles-Centre, Le Chesnay-Rocquencourt, Marly-le-Roi A86 Nanterre, Créteil, Saint-Denis, Bordeaux (A10), La Défense (A14)	Caen Le Havre Rouen	Paris
Hauts-de-Seine	A13 motorway L'Autoroute de Normandie	Le Chesnay – Paris	5 D182 Versailles-Montreuil, Vaucresson, Garches 4 D985 Saint-Cloud, Ville-d'Avray, Suresnes (only southbound) 3 D7, D907 Boulogne-Billancourt, Suresnes, Sèvres (only southbound) 2 D1 Boulogne-Billancourt (only southbound) 1 Paris-Porte d'Auteuil Boulevard Périphérique, E15, E19, E50 Paris-Centre, Lille (A1), Charles de Gaulle Airport (A1), Lyon (A6), Metz (A4), Nancy (A4), Reims (A4), Bordeaux (A10), Nantes (A10), Toulouse (A10), Belgium (Brussels) (A1)	Caen Le Havre Rouen	Paris
Paris	Boulevard Périphérique	Paris	Paris-Porte d'Auteuil, Paris-Porte Molitor (only northbound), Parc des Princes D910 Paris-Porte de St. Cloud, Boulogne-Billancourt, Bordeaux (A10), Nantes (A10) D1 Paris-Centre, Boulogne-Billancourt D7 Paris-Quai D'Issy, Issy-les-Moulineaux D76 Paris-Porte de Sèvres, Paris-Porte de Versailles, Issy-les-Moulineaux Paris-Porte de la Plaine, Paris-Porte de Versailles, Vanves (only northbound) D130 Paris-Porte Brancion, Paris-Porte de Vanves, Vanves, Malakoff D906 Paris-Porte de Châtillon, Paris-Porte de Montrouge, Malakoff, Châtillon, Montrouge D902 Paris-Porte d'Orléans, Montrouge A6a, E15, E50 Lyon, Évry, Dijon, Orly, Rungis, Orly Airport, Bordeaux (A10), Nantes (A10), Orléans (A10), Toulouse (A10), Metz (A4), Nancy (A4), Charles de Gaulle Airport (A1), Lille (A1), Rouen (A13)	Caen Le Havre Rouen	Bordeaux Nantes Orléans
Val-de-Marne	A6a motorway Autoroute du Soleil	Paris – Wissous	A6b, E15, E50 Véhicules lents – toutes directions (only southbound) ('Slow vehicles – all directions') A6b, E15, E50 Paris-Est, Paris-Porte d'Italie, Villejuif, Arcueil, Metz (A4), Nancy (A4), Lille (A1) (only northbound) A106 Orly Airport, Rungis (only southbound) 3 D165 Rungis	Paris	Bordeaux Nantes Orléans
Essonne	A6a motorway Autoroute du Soleil	Wissous	A10, E15, E50 Lyon, Évry, Dijon, Chilly-Mazarin, Bordeaux, Nantes, Toulouse, Orléans, Palaiseau, Étampes, Massy, Longjumeau (only southbound)	Paris	Bordeaux Nantes Orléans
Hauts-de-Seine	A10 motorway L'Aquitaine	Antony	/	Paris	Bordeaux Nantes Orléans
Essonne	A10 motorway L'Aquitaine	Antony – Angervilliers	N20 Antony, Champlan, Massy, Longjumeau (only southbound) 5 N20 Étampes, Orléans (par RN), La Ville-du-Bois, Linas-Montlhéry, Longjumeau, Chilly-Mazarin A126 Chilly-Mazarin, Évry (A6), Lyon (A6), Dijon (A6) (only northbound) N188 Palaiseau, Massy, Villebon-sur-Yvette A126 Versailles, Igny (only southbound) Massy, Massy TGV station (only northbound) Villebon-sur-Yvette, Orsay, Bures-sur-Yvette (only southbound) 9 D118 Chartres (par RN), Villejust, Les Ulis N118 Versailles, Rouen (A13), Paris-Porte de Saint Cloud, Boulogne-Billancourt, Les Ulis (only northbound) N104 Évry, Lyon (A6), Orléans (par RN), Troyes (A5), Linas-Montlhéry, Arpajon Aire de Limours	Paris	Bordeaux Nantes Orléans
Yvelines	A10 motorway L'Aquitaine	Angervilliers – Saint-Arnoult-en-Yvelines	10 D149 Dourdan, Saint-Arnoult-en-Yvelines, Rochefort-en-Yvelines	Paris	Bordeaux Nantes Orléans
Essonne	A10 motorway L'Aquitaine	Dourdan	/	Paris	Bordeaux Nantes Orléans
Yvelines	A10 motorway L'Aquitaine	Saint-Arnoult-en-Yvelines	Péage de Saint-Arnoult-en-Yvelines A11, E50 Nantes, Le Mans, Chartres, Ablis, Rennes (A81) (only southbound)	Paris	Bordeaux Nantes Orléans
Yvelines	A10 motorway L'Aquitaine	Saint-Arnoult-en-Yvelines – Allainville	11 N191, D191 Allainville, Ablis, Étampes, Rambouillet	Paris	Toulouse Bordeaux Clermont-Ferrand Orléans
(European Union) (France) Centre-Val de Loire Eure-et-Loir	A10 motorway L'Aquitaine	Allainville – Poupry	Aire de Boutroux Aire de Plaines de Beauce 12 N254, D927 Janville-en-Beauce, Châteaudun, Chartres, Éole-en-Beauce, Orgères-en-Beauce Aire du Heron Cendré 13 D954 Artenay, Poupry	Paris	Toulouse Bordeaux Clermont-Ferrand Orléans
Loiret	A10 motorway L'Aquitaine	Poupry – Orléans	A19, E60 Metz, Nancy, Montargis, Fontainebleau, Sens, Troyes, Pithiviers Aire d'Orléans-Saran 14 D2701 Orléans-Nord, Fleury-les-Aubrais, Saran, Ormes A71, E9 Orléans-Centre, Vierzon, Bourges, Clermont-Ferrand, Toulouse (A20), Limoges (A20)	Paris	Toulouse Bordeaux Clermont-Ferrand Orléans
Loiret	A10 motorway L'Aquitaine	Orléans – Tavers	Aire de Bellevue (only southbound) Aire des Chauvry 15 D2 Beaugency, Meung-sur-Loire, Baule, Le Bardon Aire de Meung-sur-Loire	Paris Orléans	Bordeaux Tours
Loir-et-Cher	A10 motorway L'Aquitaine	Tavers – Saint-Étienne-des-Guérets	Aire de Fougeres (only southbound) Aire de Brusolle (only northbound) 16 D205 Mer, Chambord, Muides-sur-Loire, La Chapelle-Saint-Martin-en-Plaine Aire de Villerbon (only southbound) Aire de Blois-Menars 17 D956 Blois, La Chaussée-Saint-Victor, Vendôme, Villebarou, Romorantin-Lanthenay, Le Controis-en-Sologne Aire de la Chatière (only southbound) Aire des Bruères (only northbound)	Paris Orléans	Bordeaux Tours
Indre-et-Loire	A10 motorway L'Aquitaine	Saint-Étienne-des-Guérets – Tours	18 N10, D31 Château-Renault, Amboise, Autrèche Aire de la Courte Epée (only southbound) Aire de la Picardière (only southbound) Péage de Monnaie Aire de Tours A28, E502 Le Mans, Rouen, Le Havre, Caen, Rennes 19 D910 Tours-Nord, Parçay-Meslay, Notre-Dame-d'Oé 20 D801 Tours-Nord, Montlouis-sur-Loire, Vouvray, Rochecorbon, Tours Val de Loire Airport 21 Tours-Centre, Saint-Pierre-des-Corps	Paris Orléans	Bordeaux Tours
Indre-et-Loire	A10 motorway L'Aquitaine	Tours – Antogny-le-Tillac	22 Tours-Sud, Vierzon (par RN), Saint-Avertin (only southbound) 23 Chambray-lès-Tours, Esvres, Loches 24 D37 Joué-lès-Tours, Chinon, Ballan-Miré A85, E60, E604 Angers, Nantes, Vierzon, Châteauroux, Bourges, Lyon Aire du Village Brûlé (only southbound) Aire du Moulin Rouge (only northbound) 24.1 D84 Monts, Sorigny Péage de Sorigny Aire de Sainte-Maure de Touraine (only southbound) Aire de la Fontaine Colette (only northbound) 25 D760 Sainte-Maure de Touraine, Loches, Noyant-de-Touraine, Chinon, Saumur Aire de Maillé (only southbound) Aire de Nouâtre (only northbound)	Paris Tours	Bordeaux Poitiers
(European Union) (France) Nouvelle-Aquitaine Vienne	A10 motorway L'Aquitaine	Antogny-le-Tillac – Poitiers	Aire de Châtellerault 26 D1, D161 Châtellerault-Centre, La Roche-Posay, Antran Aire des Meuniers (only southbound) Aire des Chagnats (only northbound) 27 D910 Châtellerault-Sud, Naintré, Cenon-sur-Vienne Aire de Poitiers 28 D200 Jaunay-Marigny, Chasseneuil-du-Poitou, Futuroscope 29 N147 Poitiers-Nord, Limoges, Nantes, Cholet, Parthenay, Buxerolles, Migné-Auxances Aire des Cent Septiers (only southbound) Aire des Quatre Vents (only northbound)	Paris Tours	Bordeaux Poitiers
(European Union) (France) Nouvelle-Aquitaine Vienne	A10 motorway L'Aquitaine	Poitiers – Rouillé	30 N10 Poitiers-Sud, Angoulême, Fontaine-le-Comte, Vouneuil-sous-Biard Aire de Coulombiers Aire de Rouillé-Pamproux	Paris Poitiers	Bordeaux Niort
Deux-Sèvres	A10 motorway L'Aquitaine	Rouillé – Niort	31 D611 Saint-Maixent-l'École, Soudan, Rouillé, Pamproux, Lusignan Aire de Sainte-Eanne Aire de Sainte-Néomaye A83 Rennes, Nantes, La Roche-sur-Yon, Niort-Centre 32 D948 Niort-Est, Limoges, Angoulême, Melle, Vouillé	Paris Poitiers	Bordeaux Niort
Deux-Sèvres	A10 motorway L'Aquitaine	Niort – Plaine-d'Argenson	Aire de Poitou-Charentes 33 N248 La Rochelle, Rochefort, Niort-Sud, Surgères, Frontenay-Rohan-Rohan Aire de Gript	Paris Nantes Niort	Bordeaux
Charente-Maritime	A10 motorway L'Aquitaine	Plaine-d'Argenson – Saintes	Aire de Dœuil-sur-le-Mignon Aire de Lozay (only southbound) Aire de la Benâte (only northbound) 34 D939 Cognac, Angoulême, La Rochelle, Rochefort, Saint-Jean-d'Angély, La Vergne Aire de Fenioux Aire de Port-d'Envaux	Paris Nantes Niort	Bordeaux
Charente-Maritime	A10 motorway L'Aquitaine	Saintes – Boisredon	A837, E602 La Rochelle, Rochefort, Tonnay-Charente, Île de Ré (only northbound) 35 D137, E603 Saintes, Ile d'Oléron, Marennes-Hiers-Brouage, Saujon, Royan, Cognac, Angoulême Aire de Chermignac Aire de Saint-Léger 36 D732 Pons, Cognac, Gémozac, Royan Aire de Saint-Palais Aire de Saint-Ciers 37 D730 Royan, Mirambeau, Jonzac, Montendre Aire de Boisredon (only northbound) Aire de Saint-Caprais (only southbound)	Paris Nantes La Rochelle	Bordeaux
Gironde	A10 motorway L'Aquitaine	Boisredon – Bordeaux	38 D254 Saint-Aubin-de-Blaye, Blaye, Val-de-Livenne, Étauliers, Montendre Aire de Saugon Aire de Saint-Christoly (only southbound) Aire de Cézac (only northbound) Péage de Virsac 39a D1010 Libourne, Saint-André-de-Cubzac, Bourg, Coutras 39b N10, E606 Angoulême, Barbezieux-Saint-Hilaire, Cavignac, Montlieu-la-Garde (only northbound) 40a D137 Royan, Saintes, Blaye, Pugnac (only northbound) 40b D670 Libourne, Saint-André-de-Cubzac, Bourg (only northbound) Aire d'Estalot (only southbound) Aire de Meillac (only northbound) 41 D115 Ambès, Saint-Vincent-de-Paul, Cubzac-les-Ponts 42 D1010, D242 Ambarès-et-Lagrave, Saint-Loubès 43 D911 Sainte-Eulalie, Ambarès-et-Lagrave 44 Carbon-Blanc (only southbound) 45 Carbon-Blanc, Lormont A630, N230 Bordeaux, Bordeaux–Mérignac Airport, Lyon, Toulouse, Bayonne	Paris Nantes La Rochelle	Bordeaux
Gironde	National Route 230 Bordeaux ring road	Bordeaux	27 Lormont, Carbon-Blanc (only northbound) 26 A89, N89, E70 Bordeaux-Est, Cenon, Libourne, Périgueux, Brive-la-Gaillarde, Clermont-Ferrand, Lyon 25 Cenon, Artigues-près-Bordeaux 24 D936 Bordeaux-Est, Bergerac, Tresses, Fargues-Saint-Hilaire 23 Floirac, Bouliac, Latresne 22 Latresne, Floirac	Paris Nantes La Rochelle	Spain (San Sebastián) Bayonne
Gironde	A630 motorway Bordeaux ring road	Bordeaux	21 A631 Bordeaux-Centre, Bordeaux-Saint-Jean station, Bègles 20 D108 Cadaujac, Bègles, Centre Commercial Rives d'Arcins A62, E72 Agen, Pau (A65), Toulouse, Spain (Zaragoza)(A65) 18 D651, D1113 Villenave-d'Ornon, Léognan, Cadaujac, Bordeaux-Sud 17 Talence, Gradignan 16 D1010 Talence, Gradignan 15 A63, E70 Bayonne, Arcachon, Mont-de-Marsan, Dax, Bordeaux-Ouest, Bordeaux–Mérignac Airport, Mérignac, Pessac Spain (San Sebastián)	Paris Nantes La Rochelle	Spain (San Sebastián) Bayonne
Gironde	A63 motorway Autoroute des Estuaires Autoroute de la Côte Basque	Bordeaux – Belin-Béliet	26a Gradignan 26b Canéjan (only southbound) 25 D214 Canéjan, Cestas Aire de Bordeaux-Cestas 24 D211 Saucats, Saint-Jean-d'Illac, Martignas-sur-Jalle, Cestas Aire des Gargails 23 D5 Le Barp, Marcheprime 22 A660 Arcachon, Gujan-Mestras, La Teste-de-Buch, Biscarrosse, Biganos 21 Salles, Belin-Béliet, Mios Aire de Lugos 20 D1010 Belin-Béliet, Lugos (only northbound) Aire near Belin-Béliet (only northbound)	Paris Bordeaux	Spain (San Sebastián) Bayonne
Landes	A63 motorway Autoroute des Estuaires Autoroute de la Côte Basque	Belin-Béliet – Bayonne	18 D384 Saugnacq-et-Muret, Mont-de-Marsan, Moustey Aire des Landes Péage de Saugnacq-et-Muret 17 D43 Liposthey, Parentis-en-Born, Biscarrosse, Pissos, Sore Aire de Labouheyre 16 D63, D626 Labouheyre, Mimizan, Pontenx-les-Forges, Commensacq 15 D44 Sabres, Mimizan, Escource, Solférino Aire de Onesse-Laharie 14 D38 Onesse-Laharie, Morcenx-la-Nouvelle, Contis, Saint-Julien-en-Born 13 D41 Tartas, Rion-des-Landes, Lit-et-Mixe, Saint-Julien-en-Born, Lesperon Aire de l'Océan 12 D947 Dax, Castets, Léon, Moliets-et-Maa, Vielle-Saint-Girons, Linxe, Pontonx-sur-l'Adour Péage de Castets Aire de Magescq 11 D16 Magescq, Vieux-Boucau-les-Bains, Dax, Soustons, Herm 10 D17 Soustons, Vieux-Boucau-les-Bains, Bayonne (for +7.5t) 9 D824 Dax, Mont-de-Marsan, Peyrehorade, Saint-Geours-de-Maremne, Saint-Vincent-de-Tyrosse Aire de Saubion 8 D28 Capbreton, Bénesse-Maremne, Seignosse, Saint-Vincent-de-Tyrosse, Soorts-Hossegor, Saubrigues Péage de Bénesse-Maremne Aire de Labenne 7 D85 Pau, Tarnos, Ondres, Saint-Martin-de-Seignanx, Labenne, Boucau, Peyrehorade	Paris Bordeaux	Spain (San Sebastián) Bayonne
Pyrénées-Atlantiques	A63 motorway Autoroute des Estuaires Autoroute de la Côte Basque	Bayonne-Hendaye	6 D810 Bayonne-Centre, Anglet, Saint-Pierre-d'Irube A64, E80 Orthez, Pau, Tarbes, Toulouse, Bayonne-Mousserolles 5 D932 Bayonne-Sud, Anglet, Saint-Jean-Pied-de-Port, Cambo-les-Bains, Ustaritz, Hasparren 4 D810 Biarritz, Bidart, Saint-Pée-sur-Nivelle, Biarritz Pays Basque Airport Péage de Biarritz-la Négresse Aire de Bidart 3 D810 Saint-Jean-de-Luz-Nord, Ascain, Guéthary, Ahetze 2 D810 Saint-Jean-de-Luz-Sud, Hendaye-Plage, Urrugne, Ciboure Aire d'Urrugne (only northbound) Péage de Biriatou 1 D811 Hendaye-Centre, Biriatou	Toulouse Bordeaux Bayonne	Spain (Bilbao) (San Sebastián)
(European Union) (Spain) (Basque Country (autonomous community))	AP-8 motorway	Spain towards San Sebastián, Bilbao and Madrid			
