= Port of Le Havre =

Port in Normandy, France

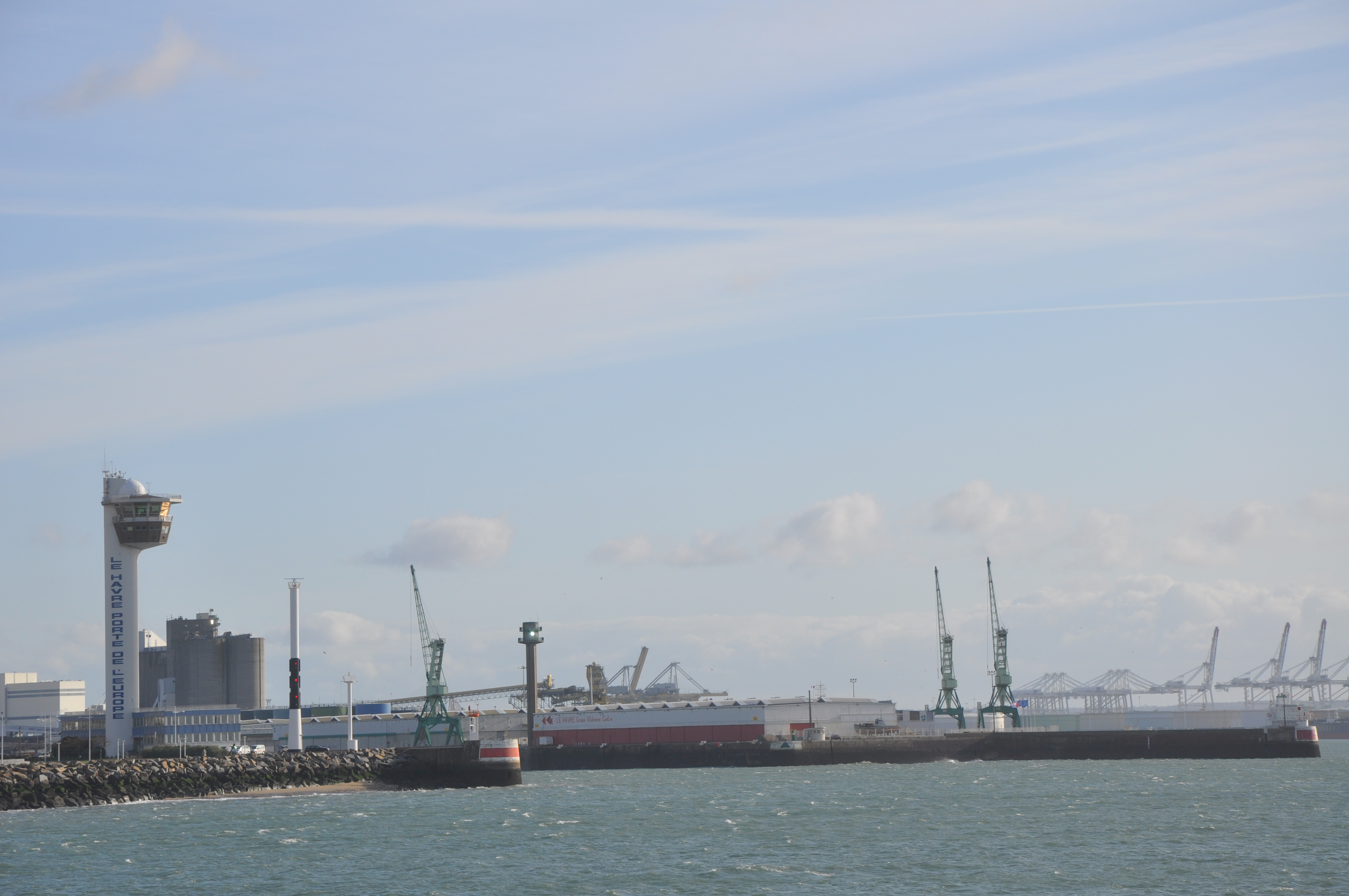
- Port entry and cranes
- Interactive map of Port of Le Havre

Location
- Country: France
- Location: Le Havre
- Coordinates: 49.475°N 0.133333°E

Details
- Opened: 1524
- Size: 10,000 ha (25,000 acres)
- Employees: 1510 (2005)

Statistics
- Vessel arrivals: 6286 (2009)
- Annual cargo tonnage: 74,399,935 tonnes (2009)
- Annual container volume: 2.2 million TEU (2009)
- Passenger traffic: 493,079 (2009)
- Website www.haropaports.com/en/lehavre

The Port of Le Havre is the port and port authority of the French city of Le Havre. It is the second-largest commercial port in France in terms of overall tonnage, and the largest container port, with three sets of terminals. It can accommodate all sizes of world cruise liners, and a major new marina is being planned. Le Havre is linked to Portsmouth, England by Brittany Ferries.

== Docks ==
The port consists of a series of canal-like docks, the Canal de Tancarville and the Grand Canal du Havre, that connect Le Havre to the Seine, close to the Pont de Tancarville, 24 km (14.9 m) upstream.

== Port Authority of Le Havre ==
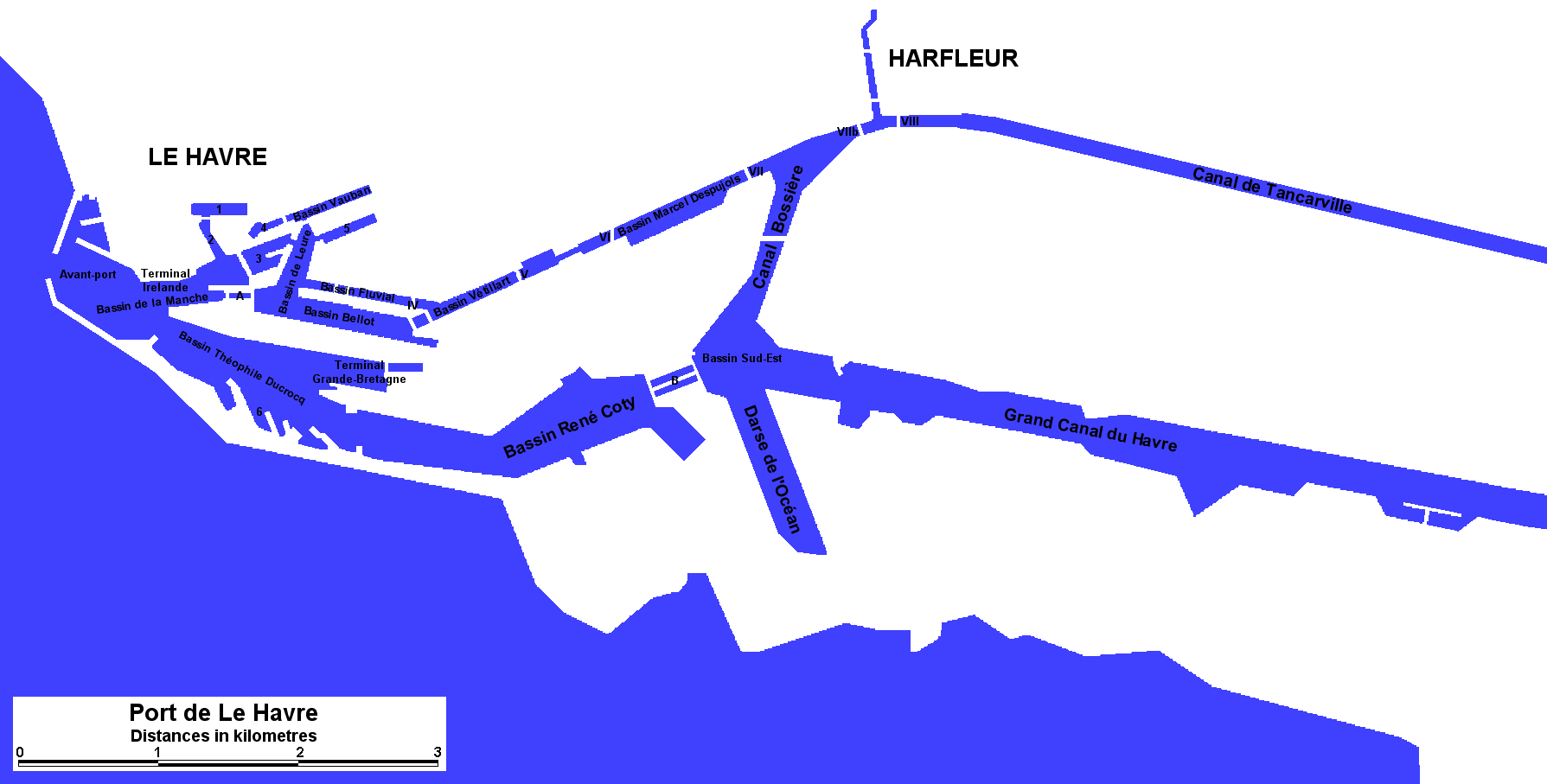
Plan of the Port, showing terminal locations and principal uses.

The Port of Le Havre is managed by a state agency called Grand Port Maritime du Havre, created by Decree 2008-1037 on 9 October 2008 and replacing the former "Port Autonome du Havre" that had been created along with Bordeaux by the first bill on port autonomy in 1920, a status granted on January 1, 1925 and confirmed by the second bill on port autonomy in 1965.

The "Grand Port Maritime du Havre" is a public institution taking care of administrative public service tasks and missions of industrial and commercial public service. It is operated as a public institution of trade and industry and is responsible for the management of all port facilities in its district. It is run by a Management Board of four members. Its surveillance council is composed of State representatives, employees, territorial community (Upper Normandy, Seine Maritime, CODAH and Le Havre) and the Chamber of Commerce and Industry.

== Cross Channel Services ==
Le Havre is currently served by Brittany Ferries, linking it to Portsmouth. The service is to cease in September 2026. Formerly, it was also operated by LD Lines until 2014, when it ceased operations.

== The Harbour office ==
The main responsibility of the Harbour office is to constantly manage sea transport through traffic forecasts, traffic control, berthing of ships, navigation assistance, radar coverage, radio connections, collection and dissemination of information, co-ordination of operations, and remote control of peripheral equipment. It also has to control the flow of navigation on its territory and manage the arrivals and departures of ships. It is also in charge of policing the harbour area, monitoring dangerous goods and organising pollution control.

== Port Pilotage ==
Ships longer than 70 metres or transporting dangerous goods must receive the help of a pilot from the pilot station of Le Havre. If masters of the ships have received a pilot's licence, they are allowed to do it alone.

== The English Channel and North Sea pilotage ==
As a door to the most frequented seas (The English Channel and the North Sea), Le Havre offers a pilotage service to enhance the safety of cruising in these areas.

== Statistics ==
The port of Le Havre is the second commercial port in France in terms of overall tonnage after Marseille and the largest container port in the country.

Between December 2004 and December 2005, the Port of Le Havre handled (in tons per year):

Type of cargo	2004	2005
Crude Oil	37 023 088	34 119 964
Refined Oil	8 816 510	10 889 122
Gasoil	440 609	396 150
Other liquids	1 503 569	1 419 464
Cereal	0	0
Animal feed	136 347	107 457
Coal	2 195 991	2 907 559
Cement	1 603 174	1 445 763
General including containers	24 017 846	23 350 408
Containers	21 560 388	21 076 488
Total	76 723 496	75 567 080

In 2022, the port handled more than 3 million containers. Of the 27 tonnes of cocaine seized in France in 2022, more than two thirds came from this port.

== Marina ==
The Port de Plaisance accepts boats 24/7 at all tides. It offers around 1160 berths, a boat launch ramp and a bunkering station. Several services such as electricity and water supplies are available for the users.

Port Vauban is located in an old dock in the city close to the railway station, behind the Sas Quinette lock and the Pont de l'Eure bridge. Port Vauban is accessible at high tide after advance notice and offers about 190 berths with a minimum stay of 1 month. It is created as part of a redevelopment project of the neighbourhood, with the creation of a commercial centre (Docks Vauban) and the Les Bains Des Docks swimming complex designed by the famous French architect Jean Nouvel.

Le Havre receives the famous Jacques Vabre transatlantic.

== Cruise ==
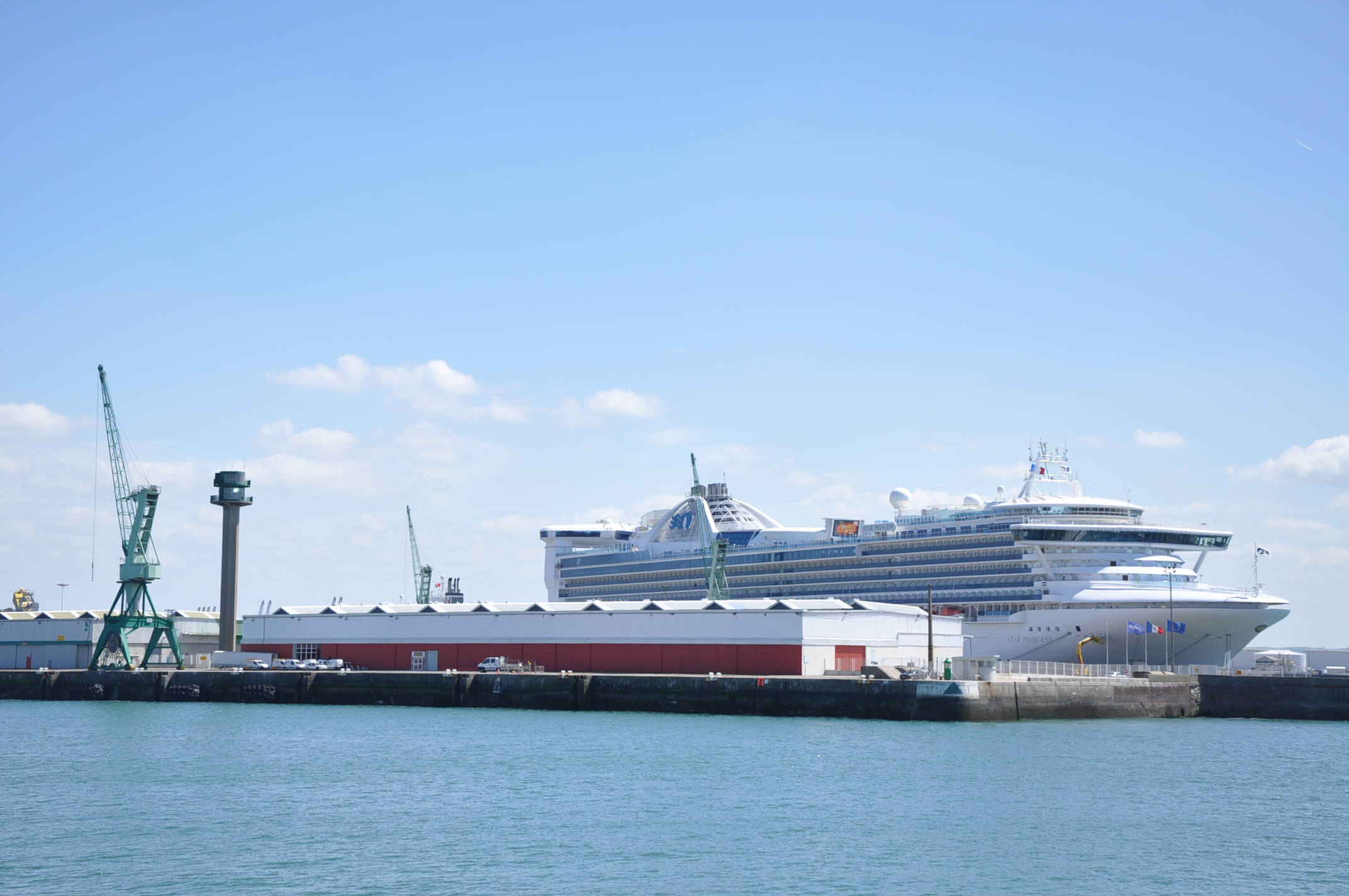
Cruise liner Star Princess in port of Le Havre.

The port of Le Havre can accommodate all sizes of world cruise liners.

Le Havre is one of the UNESCO cities. Due to its geographical location, on the Seine River mouth, at the entrance of the Channel, Le Havre is a gateway to Normandy and Paris.

In 2010, Le Havre cruise port hosted 70 calls and 130,000 passengers and should, in 2011, accommodate 90 calls and 170,000 (+23%) with several maiden calls, including : AIDASol, MS Queen Elizabeth, MSC Opera, MSC Magnifica, Mein Schiff 2, Ventura and also calls from Aida Cruises, Costa Cruises, Princess Cruises or Cunard.

Le Havre will open a new terminal in 2026 to accommodate passengers in optimum conditions. The terminal is fully equipped with a new baggage scanner, baggage handling area and check in counters.

With the increasing popularity of cruises in Europe, Le Havre is becoming a handy starting port, especially for Northern Europe cruises.

It includes a shore power connection that allows compatible ships to plug-in and turn off their engines whilst docked

== Port facilities ==
The port of Le Havre deals with every type of commodities thanks to the diversity of its terminals. Le Havre was the first container port in France and as a consequence retains a lot of facilities. Nowadays, the port of Le Havre includes three sets of terminals dedicated to containers and 6.5 kilometres of docks: The north terminal has approximately 96 ha of central reservation and consists of three terminals:

- The first is European terminal with Europe wharf:

It is 887 metres in length and comprises 2 Over-panamax cranes with 18 container carriers. Moreover, it is equipped with 1 "LHM 500" mobile crane which has a maximum load of 100 tonnes. The draught is 14.3 metres at constant level. Each crane returns a productivity of 18 containers per hour. The ground slots correspond to 7 800 TEUS and the empty blockstow correspond to 2 400 TEUS.

- The second is Americas terminal with Americas wharf :

It is 484 metres length and comprises 4 Over-panamax cranes including 3 with 18 container carriers and 1 with 20 container carriers. The draught is 14.5 metres at low tide. Each crane returns a productivity of 22 containers per hour. The ground slots corresponds to 3 400 TEUS.

- And the third is Atlantic terminal with Atlantic wharf.

It was put into service in 1968 and has a total area of 20 square metres. The wharf is 800 metres in length. It comprises 4 Over-panamax cranes of 60T with 18 container carriers. The yard facilities and the quay equipment belong to the company C.N.M.P.

The south terminal with approximately 80 ha consists of the Normandy terminal with the Asia and Osaka wharf: They are located before the lock in a tidal basin. The 2 quays offer a capacity of 1075 M dredged at 14 M. It is a private terminal : The yard facilities and the quay equipment belong to the company SETN. It is equipped with 5 super overpanamax gantry cranes.

The Ocean terminal with the Bougainville quay which is a public Terminal is located after the lock (constant level basin), its total area is 40 HA. There are 2 sheds, total area 15 000 square metres. The quay is 1.666 metres long with a water depth of 12.90 metres in a constant level basin. There are 7 ships to shore gantry cranes and 1 x 100 T crane.

In addition, five firms are capable of handling and storing the liquid bulk and two firms manage the flows of gasoil and fuel. Moreover, the port of Le Havre is competent to accommodate full bulk carriers.

Furthermore, this port is a real international facility for the vehicles flows. Thus, it is equipped, with a RoRo centre, with specific facilities to RoRo ships of all size.

Containers road traffic and hinterland increased by 13%, railway traffic by 5% and barge river by 16%. Beside the modern harbour infrastructures, Le Havre enjoys all necessary networks allowing logistic companies to despatch arriving goods:

- Main use (73%) are the A29 and A131 motorways allowing rapid access north to the Lille area (3h) and the Benelux, south to Nantes and Bordeaux, and east to the Paris area in less than 2 hours.
- The railway network freight service (around 14% of goods) offers an access to the whole European continent within one or two days..
- The river network services (around 14% of goods) are in constant development and connect the port and industrial area of Le Havre with the Paris region.

=== Port 2000 ===
The "Port 2000" terminal includes the France terminal and Oceana gate terminal with Le Havre wharf. The France terminal is managed by G.M.P and was put into service in 2006. The Oceana gate terminal is managed by T.P.O.

== See also ==
- Port of Orléans
