= Battle of Monnaie =

Franco-Prussian war

- Part of Franco-Prussian War
| Date | December 20, 1870 |
| Location | Monnaie, Indre-et-Loire, France |
| Result | German Victory |

Belligerents
| French Republic | North German Confederation: Prussia; Hanover |

Commanders and leaders
| Ferry Pisani | Konstantin von Voigts-Rhetz; Emil von Schwartzkoppen |

Units involved
| Garde Mobile | 19th Division |

Strength
| 6,000 troops, 6 field artillery | 12,000 - 14,000 troops, 24 cannons |

Casualties and losses
| Unknown | "High Casualties" |

The Battle of Monnaie, also known as the Battle of Tours was a battle of the Franco-Prussian War. It took place on the December 20, 1870 at Indre-et-Loire, France. During this engagement, a Hanover division of the Imperial German Army under the command of General Schwarzkoppen, belonging to Legion X under the command of Konstantin Bernhard von Voigts-Rhetz attacked and won the victory against an army of Garde Mobile's 234 led by General Ferry Pisani, driving the French to Langreais. This victory allowed the Germans to enter and occupy the city of Tours.

== Prelude ==
On December 20, 1870, it became apparent that the Prussians would attack Tours. While the French general Pisani had only a weak force to resist the attack, he and his men were determined not to let the Prussian army capture Tours without encountering any resistance. If his troops were to organize a defense in the city, they would be in a good position, but Pisani was conscious of the risk this posed to the inhabitants of Tours. If the French were to lose the battle, the city would be ravaged by the enemy. Thus, the French general left Tours, and took the road to Château-Renault.

== Battle ==
At Monnaie, the Garde Mobiles stationed there were attacked by the 19th Division under General Schwarzkoppen. The 19th Division had been advancing from Vendôme to Tours along the Château-Renault road, not to capture Tours but to verify that the French were still concentrated in significant numbers there, and at the same time to cut the railway line from Tours to Le Mans. While the French army numbered 6,000 men and 6 field artillery, the Prussian army had 12,000 to 14,000 troops and 24 cannons. Despite the numerical disadvantage, the French army conducted fierce resistance from morning to night, causing the Prussian army very heavy losses. But in the end, Pisani was forced to retreat. His forces withdrew to Notre-Dame d'Oe, near Tours.

== Capture of and subsequent withdrawal from Tours ==
After this victory, the German army continued its advance, and, on the morning of December 21, 1870, they appeared at the walls of Tours in great numbers. From nearby heights, the Germans launched an artillery barrage, causing damage to several townspeople on the street. The French armistice flag was raised, and the mayor appeared before the German forces and ordered them to stop shelling. The Germans accepted this offer and Hanoverian troops entered Tours. However, General Schwarzkoppen did not establish his headquarters here, but instead preferred to set up headquarters to the east. That same day, the X Corps was headquartered at Blois. Tours surrendered, but the Germans did not last long in the city. It was too far from the main force of the Second Army under the command of Prince Friedrich Karl of Prussia, so it was not certain that the Germans could safely capture Tours. Voigtz-Rhetz was ordered to withdraw to Orléans with his X Army Corps, to monitor the movements of the corps under French general Charles Denis Bourbaki which more threatened the Prussian army.
