= Canton of Mantes-la-Jolie =

Coordinates: 48.99°N 1.71°E

The canton of Mantes-la-Jolie is an administrative division of the Yvelines department, northern France. Its borders were modified at the French canton reorganisation which came into effect in March 2015. Its seat is in Mantes-la-Jolie.

It consists of the following communes:

1. Buchelay
2. Magnanville
3. Mantes-la-Jolie
4. Mantes-la-Ville
5. Rosny-sur-Seine
