= Tancarville =

- Commune
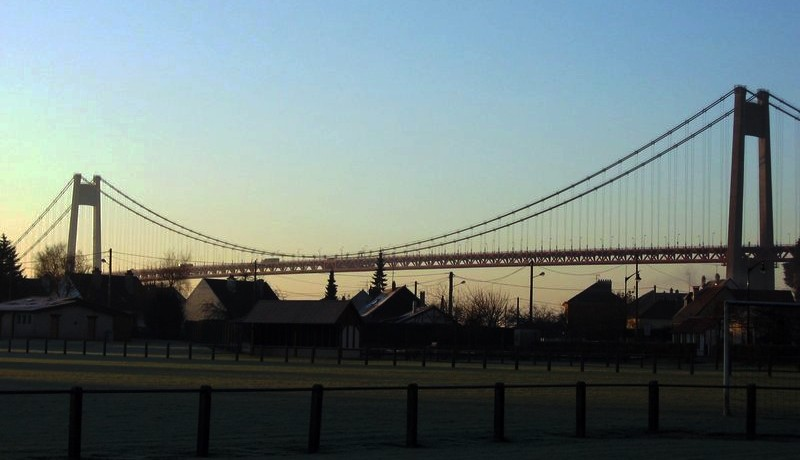
- Tancarville Bridge

- Coat of arms
- Location of Tancarville
- Location within France Location within Normandy
- Coordinates: 49°29′16″N 0°27′16″E
- Country: France
- Region: Normandy
- Department: Seine-Maritime
- Arrondissement: Le Havre
- Canton: Bolbec
- Intercommunality: Caux Seine Agglo

Government
  - Mayor (2020–2026): Frédéric Rabby-Demaison
- Area^{1}: 7.42 km^{2} (2.86 sq mi)
- Elevation: 90 m (300 ft)
- Highest elevation: 117 m (384 ft)
- Lowest elevation: 0 m (0 ft)
- Population (2023): 1,268
  - Density: 171/km^{2} (443/sq mi)
- Time zone: UTC+01:00 (CET)
  - Summer (DST): UTC+02:00 (CEST)
- INSEE/Postal code: 76684 /76430
- ^{1} French Land Register data, which excludes lakes, ponds, glaciers > 1 km^{2} (0.386 sq mi or 247 acres) and river estuaries.

Tancarville (French pronunciation: [tɑ̃kaʁvil]) is a commune in the Seine-Maritime department in the Normandy region of northern France.

== Geography ==
Tancarville is a farming village surrounded by woodland, by the banks of the river Seine in the Pays de Caux, some 14 miles (23 km) east of Le Havre and near the junction of the D39, D982 and D910 roads at the eastern end of the A131 autoroute. The canal de Tancarville to le Havre starts here and it is also the site of the 125 m high Tancarville Bridge.

== History ==
Tancarvilla 1103; Tancardi villae 1114; Tankrad's farm. Germanic male given name Tankrad > Tancred, common in the duchy of Normandy. The first lords of Tancarville were the chamberlains of the Norman dukes, and then of the King of England too. William de Tancarville, a grandson of Stephen, Count of Tréguier, trained William Marshal, 1st Earl of Pembroke, whom he knighted in 1166. The title Earl of Tankerville was created in the Peerage of England for John Grey by King Henry V, during the Hundred Years' War and still exists, albeit in a later creation.

=== Heraldry ===
Arms of Tancarville	The arms of Tancarville are blazoned : Gules, an escutcheon argent between 8 angennes (roses) in orle. (Note: this angenne is very rose-like, not the highly stylized cinqfoil.)

== Population ==
Historical population
Year	Pop.	±% p.a.
1968	921	—
1975	1,026	+1.55%
1982	1,139	+1.50%
1990	1,326	+1.92%
1999	1,234	−0.80%
2007	1,264	+0.30%
2012	1,368	+1.59%
2017	1,284	−1.26%
2023	1,268	−0.21%
Source: INSEE

== Places of interest ==
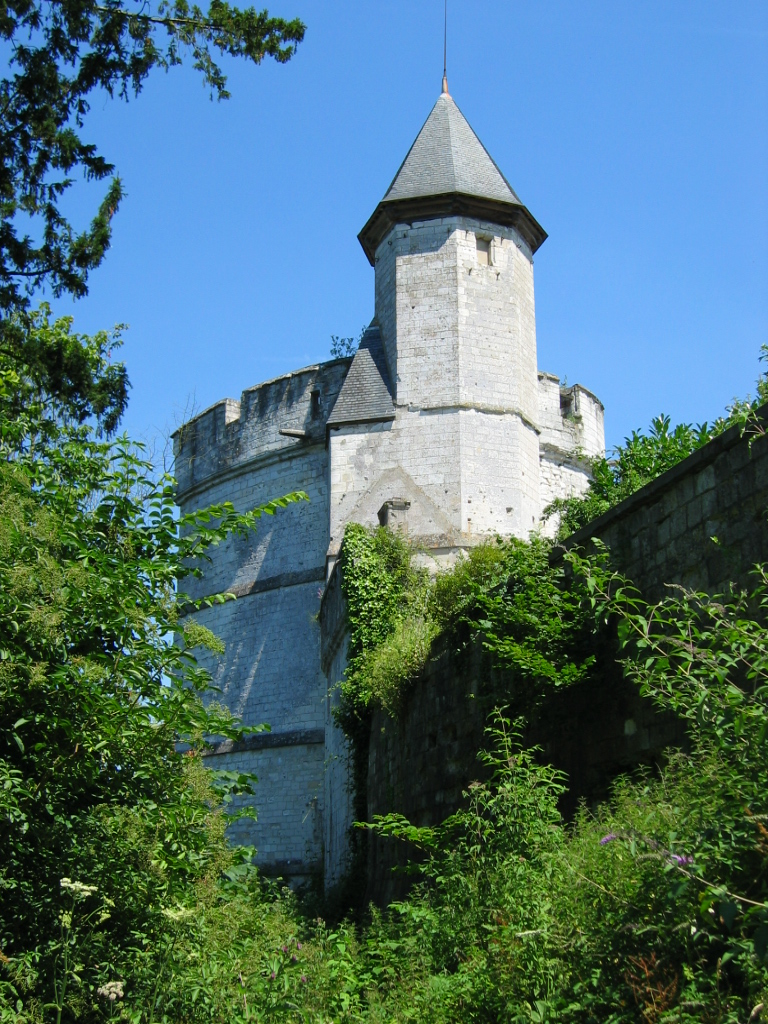
The 12th-century Château de Tancarville

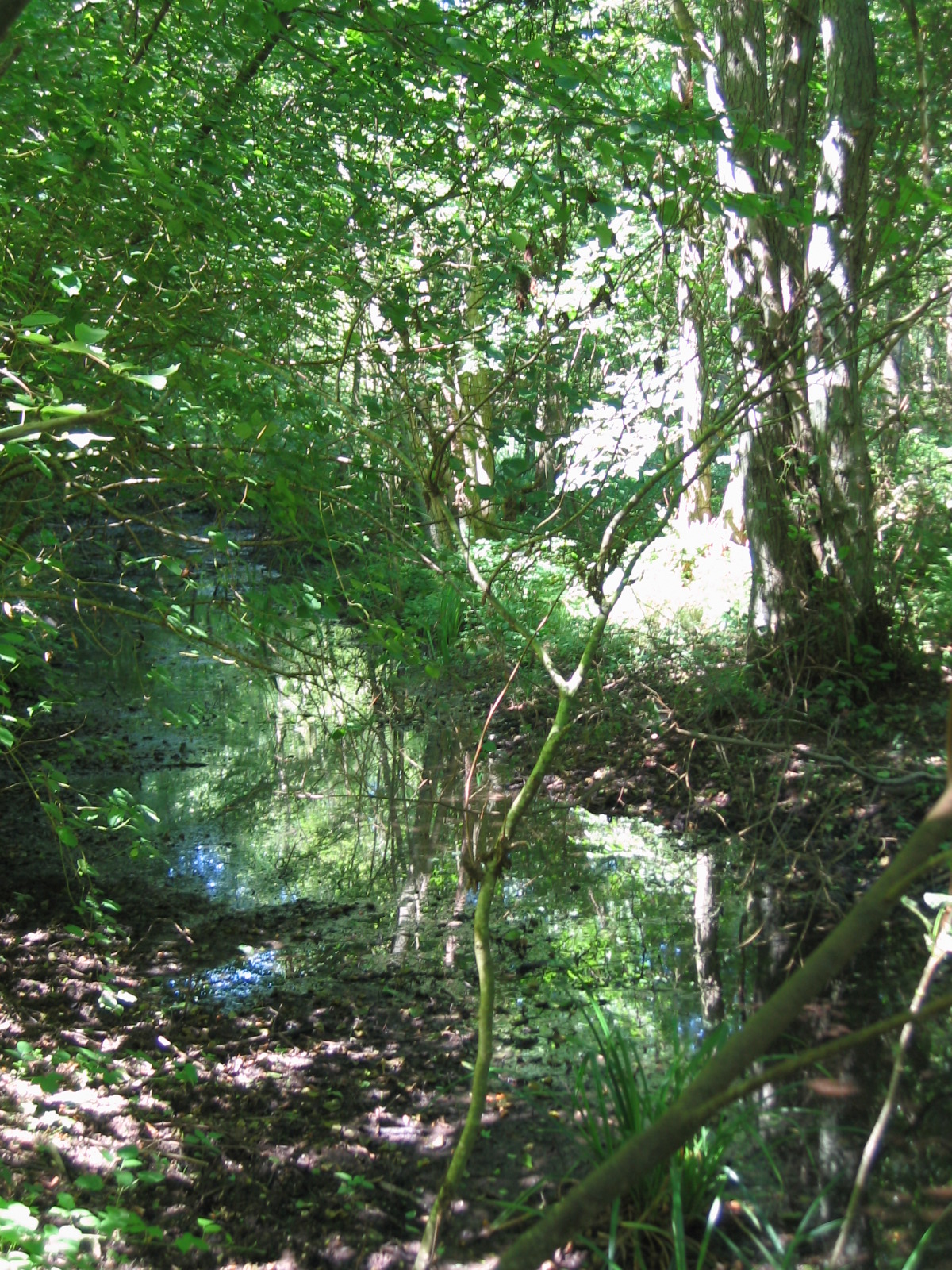
The vivier (park) of Tancarville

- The 19th-century church of St. Michel
- The 12th-century Château de Tancarville and chapel
- An 18th-century château
- The château of Drumare
- The Tancarville Bridge
- Vivier de Tancarville, a large natural reserve

== See also ==
- Tancarville Bridge
- Communes of the Seine-Maritime department
