= European route E603 =

Road in trans-European E-road network

E603

Route information
- Length: 172 km (107 mi)

Major junctions
- From: Saintes
- Angoulême
- To: Limoges

Location
- Countries: France

Highway system
- International E-road network; A Class; B Class

European route E 603 is a European B class road in France, connecting the cities Saintes and Limoges.

== Route ==
- France
  - E602 Saintes
  - E606 Angoulême
  - E09 Limoges
