= Tancarville Bridge =

- Coordinates: 49°28′20″N 0°27′53″E
- Crosses: Seine River
- Locale: Tancarville and Marais-Vernier, France
- Official name: Pont de Tancarville

Characteristics
- Design: Suspension bridge
- Total length: 1,420 metres (4,660 ft)
- Width: 12.5 metres (41 ft)
- Longest span: 608 metres (1,995 ft)
- Clearance below: 50.85 metres (166.8 ft)

History
- Opened: 1959

Statistics
- Toll: €2.60–€6.60

Location
- Interactive map of Tancarville Bridge

The Tancarville Bridge (Pont de Tancarville in French) is a suspension bridge that crosses the Seine River and connects Tancarville (Seine-Maritime) and Marais-Vernier (Eure), near Le Havre.

The bridge was completed in 1959 at a cost of 9 billion francs. In the 1990s it was realized that the cables had corroded and the shoulders were crumbling. Between 1996 and 1999, both the cables and shoulders were replaced.

A brand of clothes horse introduced in 1960 was named Tancarville for its resemblance to the new bridge; in France, especially the northwest, the name has become a genericised trademark for "clothes horse".

== See also ==
- Pont de Normandie
