= Buchelay =

- Commune
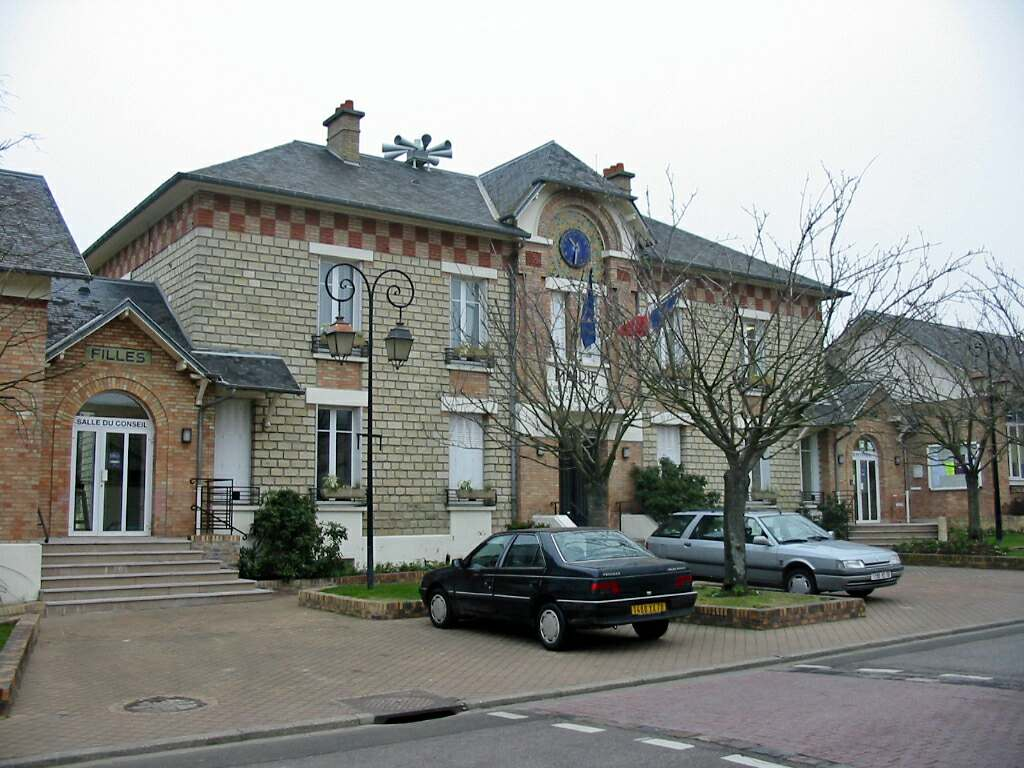
- The town hall in Buchelay

- Coat of arms
- Location of Buchelay
- Location within France Location within Île-de-France (region)
- Coordinates: 48°58′48″N 1°40′23″E
- Country: France
- Region: Île-de-France
- Department: Yvelines
- Arrondissement: Mantes-la-Jolie
- Canton: Mantes-la-Jolie
- Intercommunality: CU Grand Paris Seine et Oise

Government
  - Mayor (2023–2026): Stéphane Tremblay
- Area^{1}: 4.94 km^{2} (1.91 sq mi)
- Elevation: 59 m (194 ft)
- Highest elevation: 128 m (420 ft)
- Lowest elevation: 26 m (85 ft)
- Population (2023): 3,360
  - Density: 680/km^{2} (1,760/sq mi)
- Time zone: UTC+01:00 (CET)
  - Summer (DST): UTC+02:00 (CEST)
- INSEE/Postal code: 78118 /78200
- ^{1} French Land Register data, which excludes lakes, ponds, glaciers > 1 km^{2} (0.386 sq mi or 247 acres) and river estuaries.

Buchelay (French pronunciation: [byʃlɛ]) is a commune in the Yvelines department in the Île-de-France region in north-central France.

== Population ==
Historical population
| Year | Pop. | ±% p.a. |
|---|---|---|
| 1968 | 1,090 | — |
| 1975 | 1,064 | −0.34% |
| 1982 | 1,043 | −0.28% |
| 1990 | 2,066 | +8.92% |
| 1999 | 2,203 | +0.72% |
| 2007 | 2,243 | +0.23% |
| 2012 | 2,619 | +3.15% |
| 2017 | 3,133 | +3.65% |
| 2023 | 3,360 | +1.17% |
Source: INSEE

== See also ==
- Communes of the Yvelines department
