= Pamproux =

- Commune
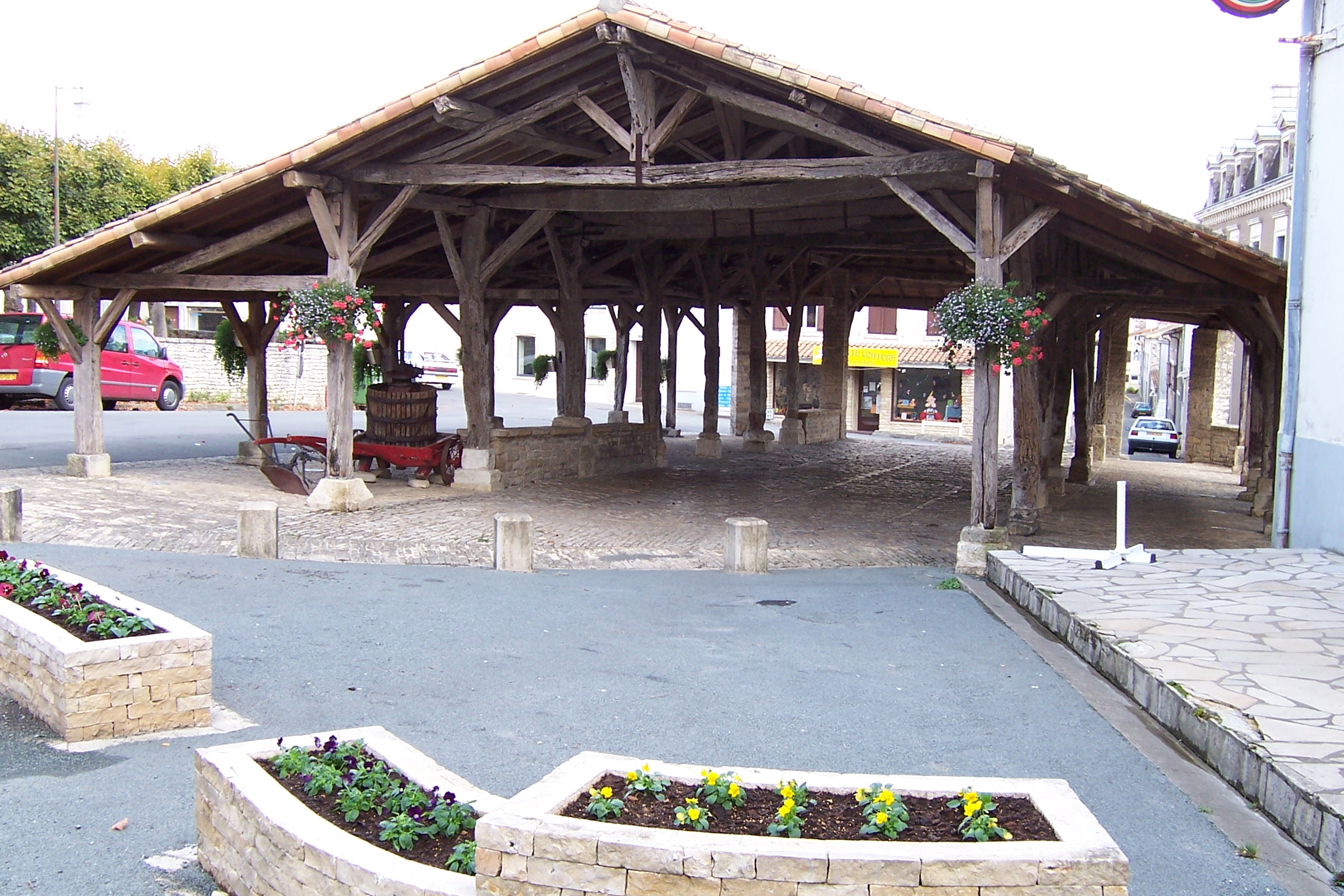
- The covered market in Pamproux

- Coat of arms
- Location of Pamproux
- Location within France Location within Nouvelle-Aquitaine
- Coordinates: 46°23′48″N 0°03′15″W
- Country: France
- Region: Nouvelle-Aquitaine
- Department: Deux-Sèvres
- Arrondissement: Niort
- Canton: Celles-sur-Belle

Government
  - Mayor (2020–2026): Marie Naudin
- Area^{1}: 36.3 km^{2} (14.0 sq mi)
- Elevation: 130 m (430 ft)
- Highest elevation: 183 m (600 ft)
- Lowest elevation: 77 m (253 ft)
- Population (2023): 1,686
  - Density: 46.4/km^{2} (120/sq mi)
- Demonym(s): Pamprousienne, Pamprousien
- Time zone: UTC+01:00 (CET)
  - Summer (DST): UTC+02:00 (CEST)
- INSEE/Postal code: 79201 /79800
- Website: http://www.pamproux.fr/
- ^{1} French Land Register data, which excludes lakes, ponds, glaciers > 1 km^{2} (0.386 sq mi or 247 acres) and river estuaries.

Pamproux (French pronunciation: [pɑ̃pʁu]) is a commune in the Deux-Sèvres département, Nouvelle-Aquitaine, France.
