= Virsac =

- Commune
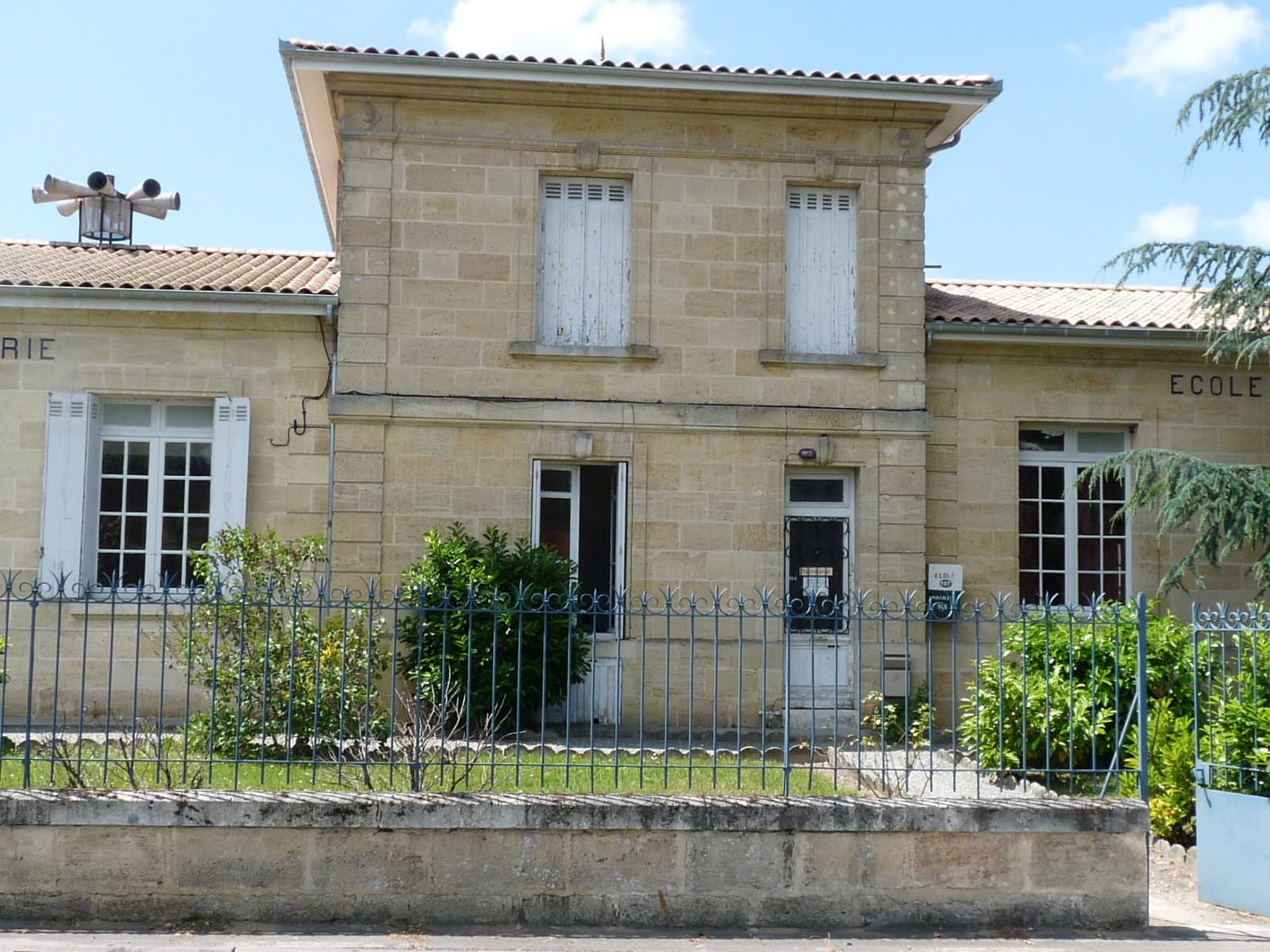
- The town hall in Virsac
- Location of Virsac
- Location within France Location within Nouvelle-Aquitaine
- Coordinates: 45°01′41″N 0°26′23″W
- Country: France
- Region: Nouvelle-Aquitaine
- Department: Gironde
- Arrondissement: Blaye
- Canton: Le Nord-Gironde

Government
  - Mayor (2020–2026): Christiane Bourseau
- Area^{1}: 3.6 km^{2} (1.4 sq mi)
- Elevation: 45 m (148 ft)
- Highest elevation: 56 m (184 ft)
- Lowest elevation: 33 m (108 ft)
- Population (2023): 1,304
  - Density: 360/km^{2} (940/sq mi)
- Time zone: UTC+01:00 (CET)
  - Summer (DST): UTC+02:00 (CEST)
- INSEE/Postal code: 33553 /33240
- ^{1} French Land Register data, which excludes lakes, ponds, glaciers > 1 km^{2} (0.386 sq mi or 247 acres) and river estuaries.

Virsac (French pronunciation: [viʁsak]; Occitan: Virçac) is a commune in the Gironde department in Nouvelle-Aquitaine in southwestern France.

== Population ==
Historical population
Year	Pop.	±% p.a.
1968	341	—
1975	407	+2.56%
1982	593	+5.52%
1990	926	+5.73%
1999	901	−0.30%
2007	965	+0.86%
2012	1,035	+1.41%
2017	1,112	+1.45%
2023	1,304	+2.69%
Source: INSEE

== See also ==
- Communes of the Gironde department
