= Rouillé =

- Commune
- Coat of arms
- Location of Rouillé
- Location within France Location within Nouvelle-Aquitaine
- Coordinates: 46°25′17″N 0°02′25″E
- Country: France
- Region: Nouvelle-Aquitaine
- Department: Vienne
- Arrondissement: Poitiers
- Canton: Lusignan
- Intercommunality: CU Grand Poitiers

Government
  - Mayor (2020–2026): Jean-Luc Soulard
- Area^{1}: 52.04 km^{2} (20.09 sq mi)
- Highest elevation: 183 m (600 ft)
- Lowest elevation: 122 m (400 ft)
- Population (2023): 2,533
  - Density: 48.67/km^{2} (126.1/sq mi)
- Time zone: UTC+01:00 (CET)
  - Summer (DST): UTC+02:00 (CEST)
- INSEE/Postal code: 86213 /86480
- ^{1} French Land Register data, which excludes lakes, ponds, glaciers > 1 km^{2} (0.386 sq mi or 247 acres) and river estuaries.

Rouillé (French pronunciation: [ʁuje]) is a commune in the Vienne department in the Nouvelle-Aquitaine region in western France.

== Population ==
Historical population
Year	Pop.	±% p.a.
1968	2,157	—
1975	2,182	+0.16%
1982	2,111	−0.47%
1990	2,121	+0.06%
1999	2,128	+0.04%
2007	2,436	+1.70%
2012	2,533	+0.78%
2017	2,468	−0.52%
2023	2,533	+0.43%
Source: INSEE

== See also ==
- Communes of the Vienne department
