= Belin-Béliet =

- Commune
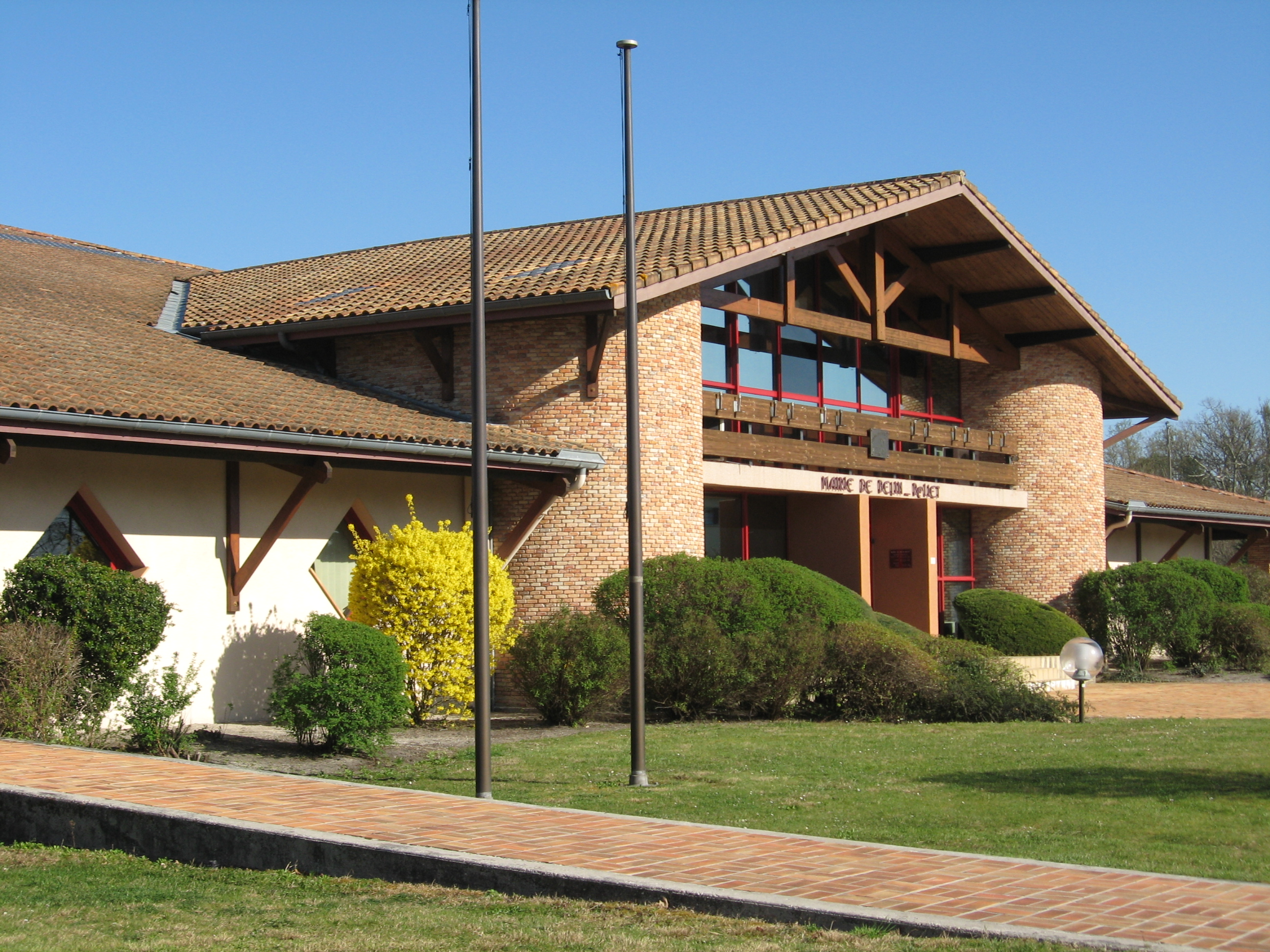
- Town hall

- Coat of arms
- Location of Belin-Béliet
- Location within France Location within Nouvelle-Aquitaine
- Coordinates: 44°29′54″N 0°47′20″W
- Country: France
- Region: Nouvelle-Aquitaine
- Department: Gironde
- Arrondissement: Arcachon
- Canton: Les Landes des Graves
- Intercommunality: Val de l'Eyre

Government
  - Mayor (2020–2026): Cyrille Declercq
- Area^{1}: 0.1 km^{2} (0.039 sq mi)
- Elevation: 27 m (89 ft)
- Highest elevation: 84 m (276 ft)
- Lowest elevation: 11 m (36 ft)
- Population (2023): 6,275
  - Density: 63,000/km^{2} (160,000/sq mi)
- Time zone: UTC+01:00 (CET)
  - Summer (DST): UTC+02:00 (CEST)
- INSEE/Postal code: 33042 /33830
- ^{1} French Land Register data, which excludes lakes, ponds, glaciers > 1 km^{2} (0.386 sq mi or 247 acres) and river estuaries.

Belin-Béliet (French pronunciation: [bəlɛ̃ belje]; Gascon: Belin e Beliet) is a commune in the Gironde department in southwestern France. It was created in 1974 by the merger of the former communes Belin and Béliet.

== Population ==
The population data given in the table below for 1968 and earlier refer to the former commune of Belin.

Historical population

Year	Pop.	±% p.a.
1793	1,280	—
1800	1,202	−0.89%
1806	1,300	+1.31%
1821	1,277	−0.12%
1831	1,411	+1.00%
1836	1,550	+1.90%
1841	1,545	−0.06%
1846	1,558	+0.17%
1851	1,786	+2.77%
1856	1,753	−0.37%
1861	1,768	+0.17%
1866	1,807	+0.44%
1872	1,860	+0.48%
1876	1,830	−0.41%
1881	1,668	−1.84%
1886	1,765	+1.14%
1891	1,722	−0.49%
1896	1,678	−0.52%
1901	1,694	+0.19%

Year	Pop.	±% p.a.
1906	1,713	+0.22%
1911	1,762	+0.57%
1921	1,737	−0.14%
1926	1,691	−0.54%
1931	1,574	−1.42%
1936	1,527	−0.60%
1946	1,466	−0.41%
1954	1,779	+2.45%
1962	1,714	−0.46%
1968	1,657	−0.56%
1975	2,229	+4.33%
1982	2,439	+1.29%
1990	2,626	+0.93%
1999	2,757	+0.54%
2007	4,022	+4.83%
2012	4,623	+2.82%
2017	5,529	+3.64%
2023	6,275	+2.13%

Source: EHESS and INSEE (1975-2023)

== See also ==
- Communes of the Gironde department
- Parc naturel régional des Landes de Gascogne
