= Monnaie =

- Commune
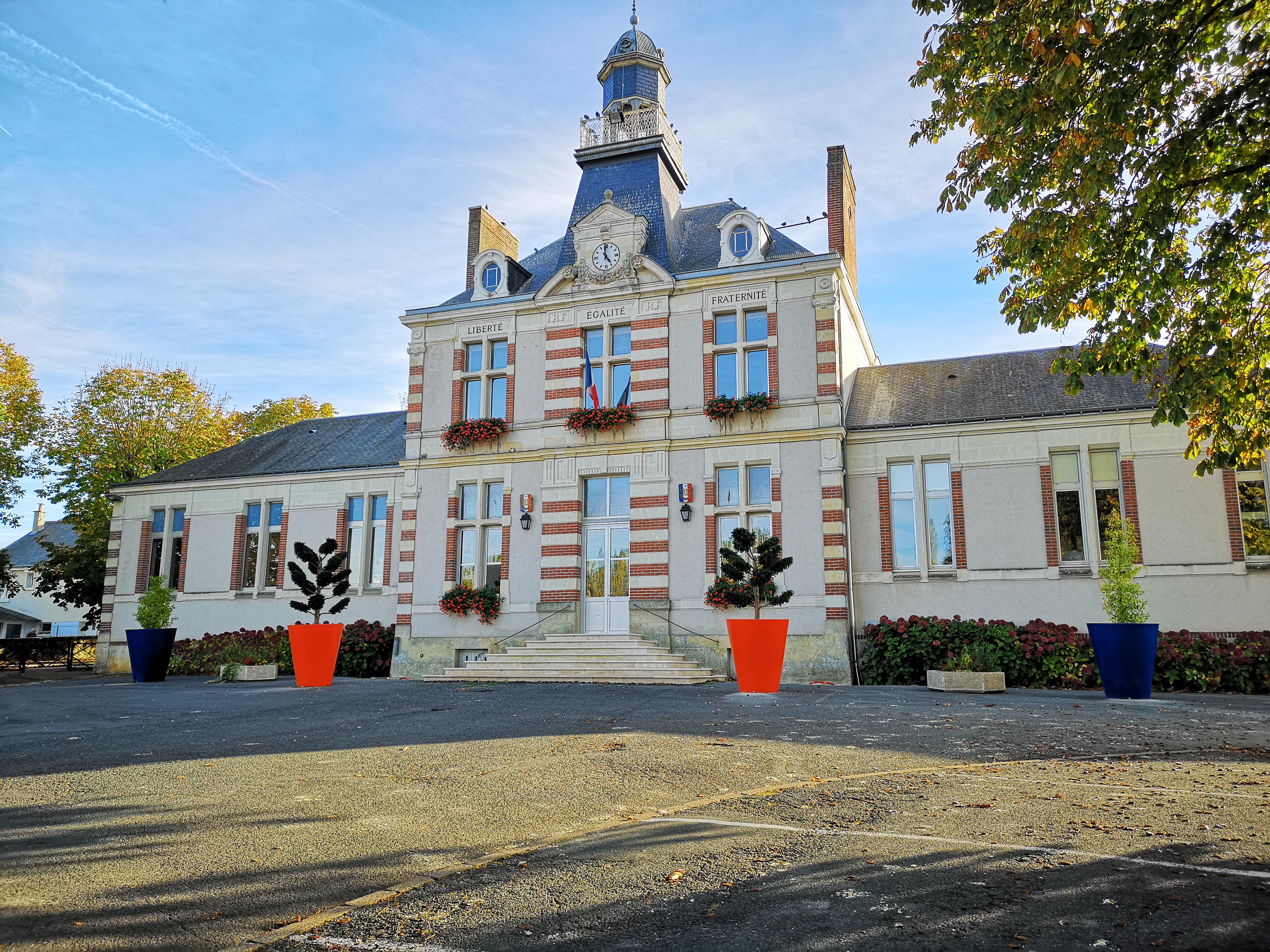
- Town hall

- Coat of arms
- Location of Monnaie
- Location within France Location within Centre-Val de Loire
- Coordinates: 47°30′05″N 0°47′10″E
- Country: France
- Region: Centre-Val de Loire
- Department: Indre-et-Loire
- Arrondissement: Tours
- Canton: Vouvray

Government
  - Mayor (2022–2026): Jacques Lemaire
- Area^{1}: 39.42 km^{2} (15.22 sq mi)
- Highest elevation: 147 m (482 ft)
- Lowest elevation: 89 m (292 ft)
- Population (2023): 4,833
  - Density: 122.6/km^{2} (317.5/sq mi)
- Time zone: UTC+01:00 (CET)
  - Summer (DST): UTC+02:00 (CEST)
- INSEE/Postal code: 37153 /37380
- ^{1} French Land Register data, which excludes lakes, ponds, glaciers > 1 km^{2} (0.386 sq mi or 247 acres) and river estuaries.

Monnaie (French pronunciation: [mɔnɛ]) is a commune in the Indre-et-Loire department in central France. The town is part of the Touraine-Est Vallées community of communes, which facilitates regional cooperation on various administrative and developmental matters.

== History ==
During the Franco-Prussian War, the Battle of Monnaie took place on 20 December 1870. In this engagement, a Hanover division of the Imperial German Army, commanded by General Schwarzkoppen, defeated French forces led by General Ferry Pisani, subsequently leading to the German occupation of Tours.

== Population ==
Historical population

Year	Pop.	±% p.a.
1793	1,060	—
1800	1,072	+0.16%
1806	1,236	+2.40%
1821	1,203	−0.18%
1831	1,237	+0.28%
1836	1,550	+4.61%
1841	1,728	+2.20%
1846	1,727	−0.01%
1851	1,678	−0.57%
1856	1,651	−0.32%
1861	1,575	−0.94%
1866	1,701	+1.55%
1872	1,605	−0.96%
1876	1,680	+1.15%
1881	1,719	+0.46%
1886	1,761	+0.48%
1891	1,751	−0.11%
1896	1,787	+0.41%
1901	1,914	+1.38%

Year	Pop.	±% p.a.
1906	1,807	−1.14%
1911	1,720	−0.98%
1921	1,609	−0.66%
1926	1,593	−0.20%
1931	1,668	+0.92%
1936	1,752	+0.99%
1946	1,592	−0.95%
1954	1,622	+0.23%
1962	1,592	−0.23%
1968	1,808	+2.14%
1975	1,892	+0.65%
1982	2,250	+2.51%
1990	2,829	+2.90%
1999	3,302	+1.73%
2007	3,835	+1.89%
2012	4,166	+1.67%
2017	4,439	+1.28%
2023	4,833	+1.43%

Source: EHESS and INSEE (1968-2023)

== See also ==
- Communes of the Indre-et-Loire department
