= Blaru =

- Commune
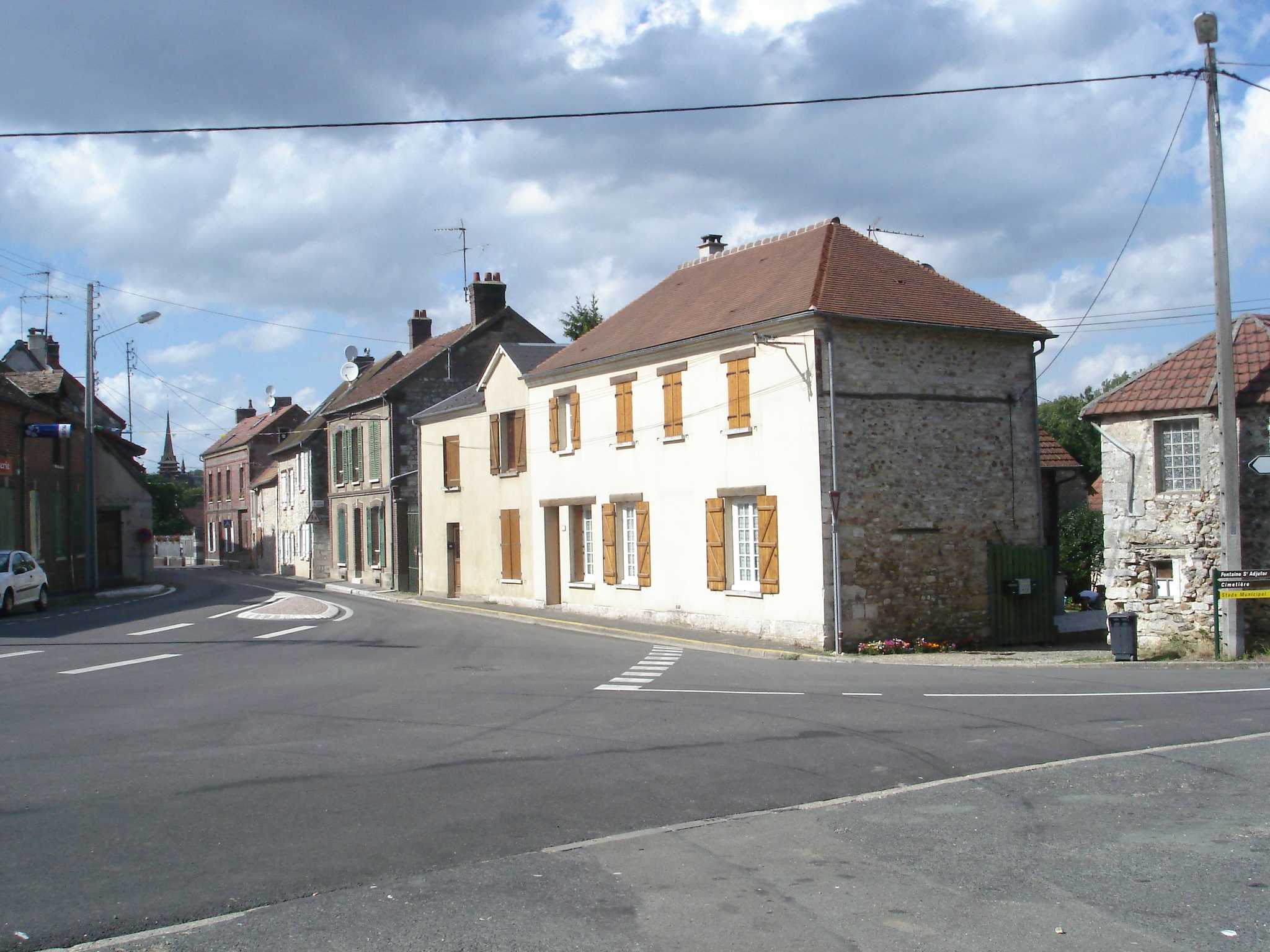
- A view within Blaru
- Location of Blaru
- Location within France Location within Île-de-France (region)
- Coordinates: 49°02′56″N 1°28′44″E
- Country: France
- Region: Île-de-France
- Department: Yvelines
- Arrondissement: Mantes-la-Jolie
- Canton: Bonnières-sur-Seine
- Intercommunality: Portes de l'Île-de-France

Government
  - Mayor (2020–2026): Joëlle Rollin
- Area^{1}: 14.84 km^{2} (5.73 sq mi)
- Elevation: 90 m (300 ft)
- Highest elevation: 152 m (499 ft)
- Lowest elevation: 50 m (160 ft)
- Population (2023): 907
  - Density: 61.1/km^{2} (158/sq mi)
- Time zone: UTC+01:00 (CET)
  - Summer (DST): UTC+02:00 (CEST)
- INSEE/Postal code: 78068 /78270
- ^{1} French Land Register data, which excludes lakes, ponds, glaciers > 1 km^{2} (0.386 sq mi or 247 acres) and river estuaries.

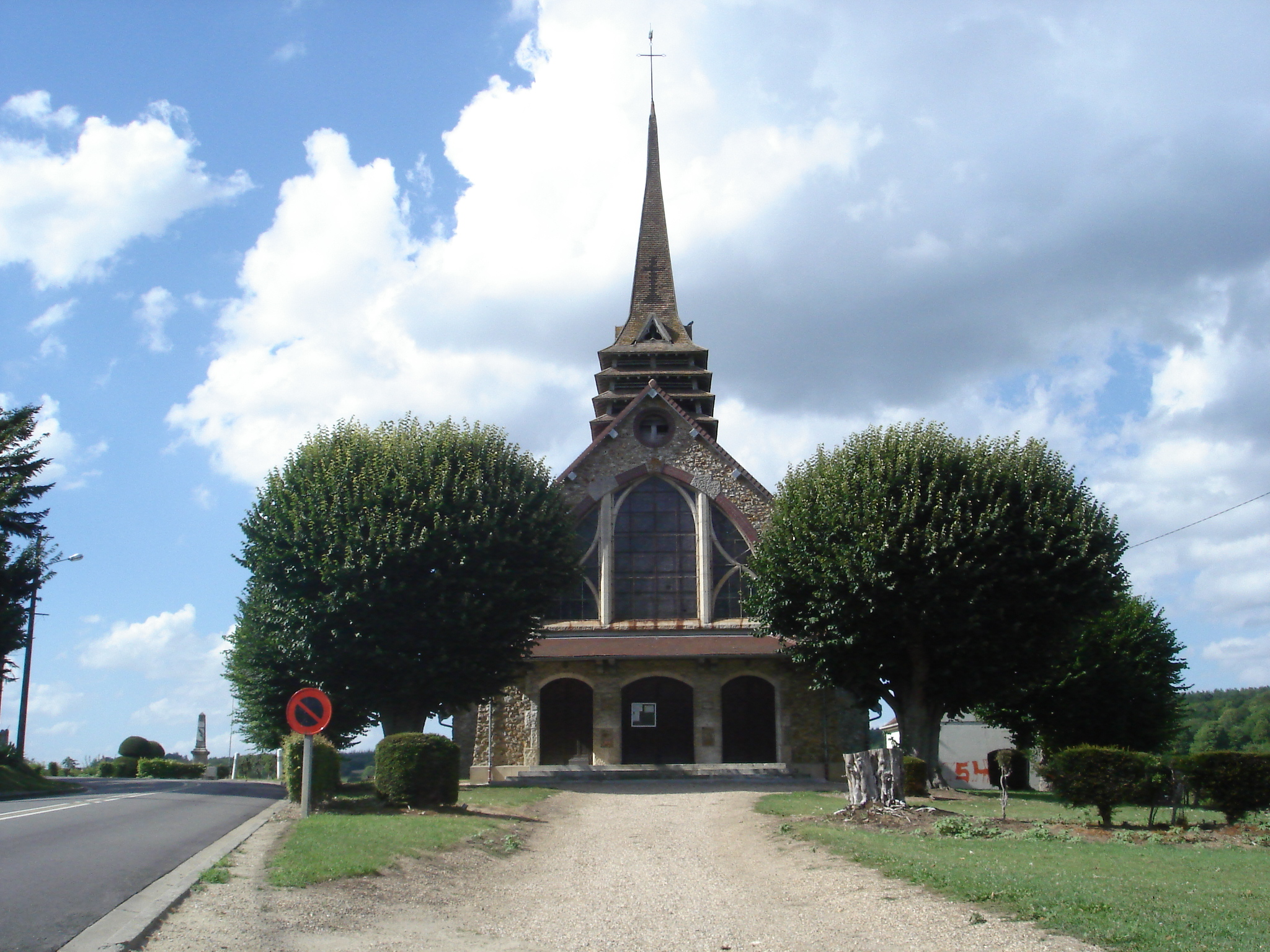
Saint-Hilaire

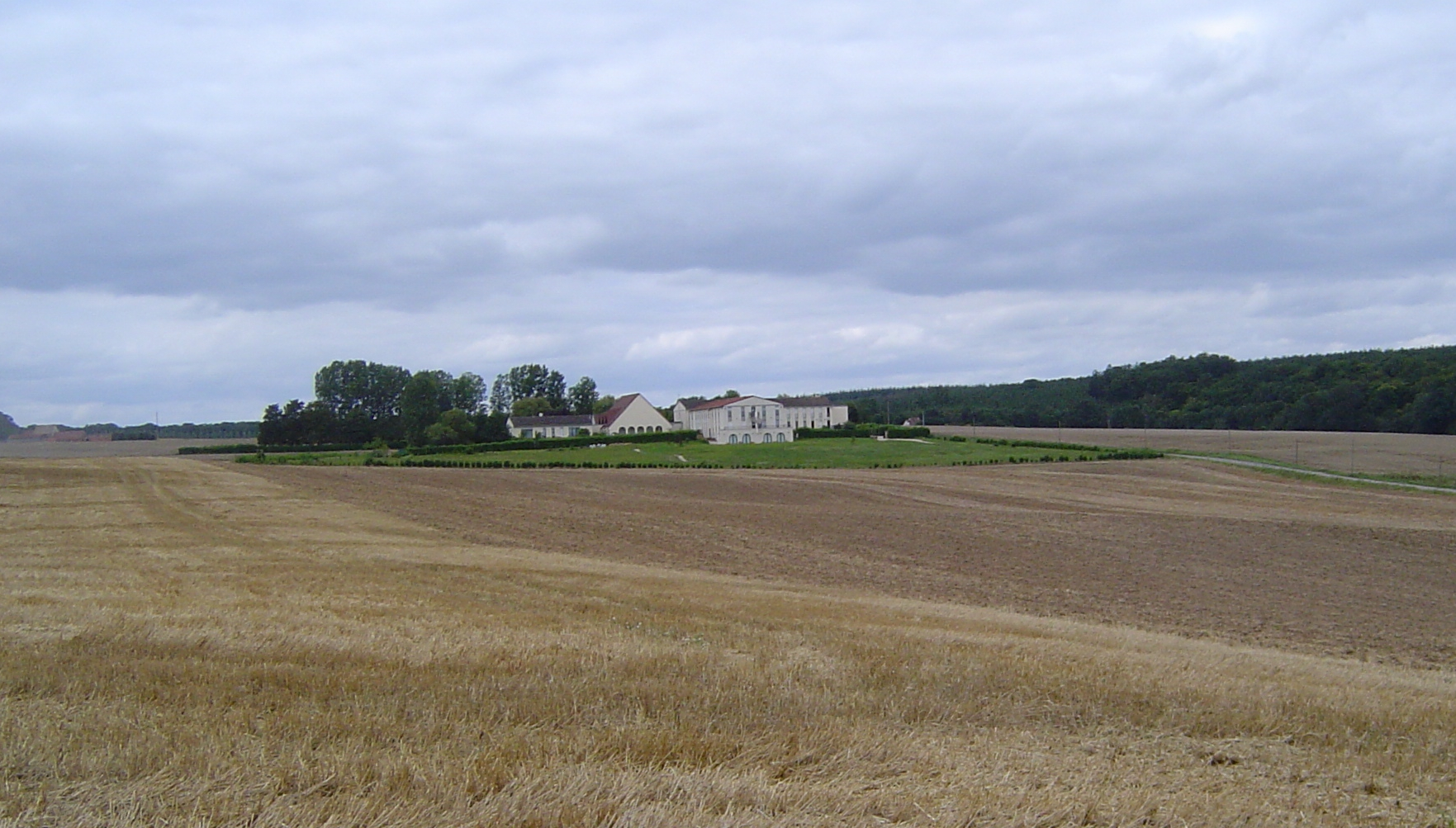
Priory of Béthanie

Blaru (French pronunciation: [blaʁy]) is a commune in the Yvelines department in north-central France.

== See also ==
- Communes of the Yvelines department
