= Saint-Ouen-de-Thouberville =

- Commune
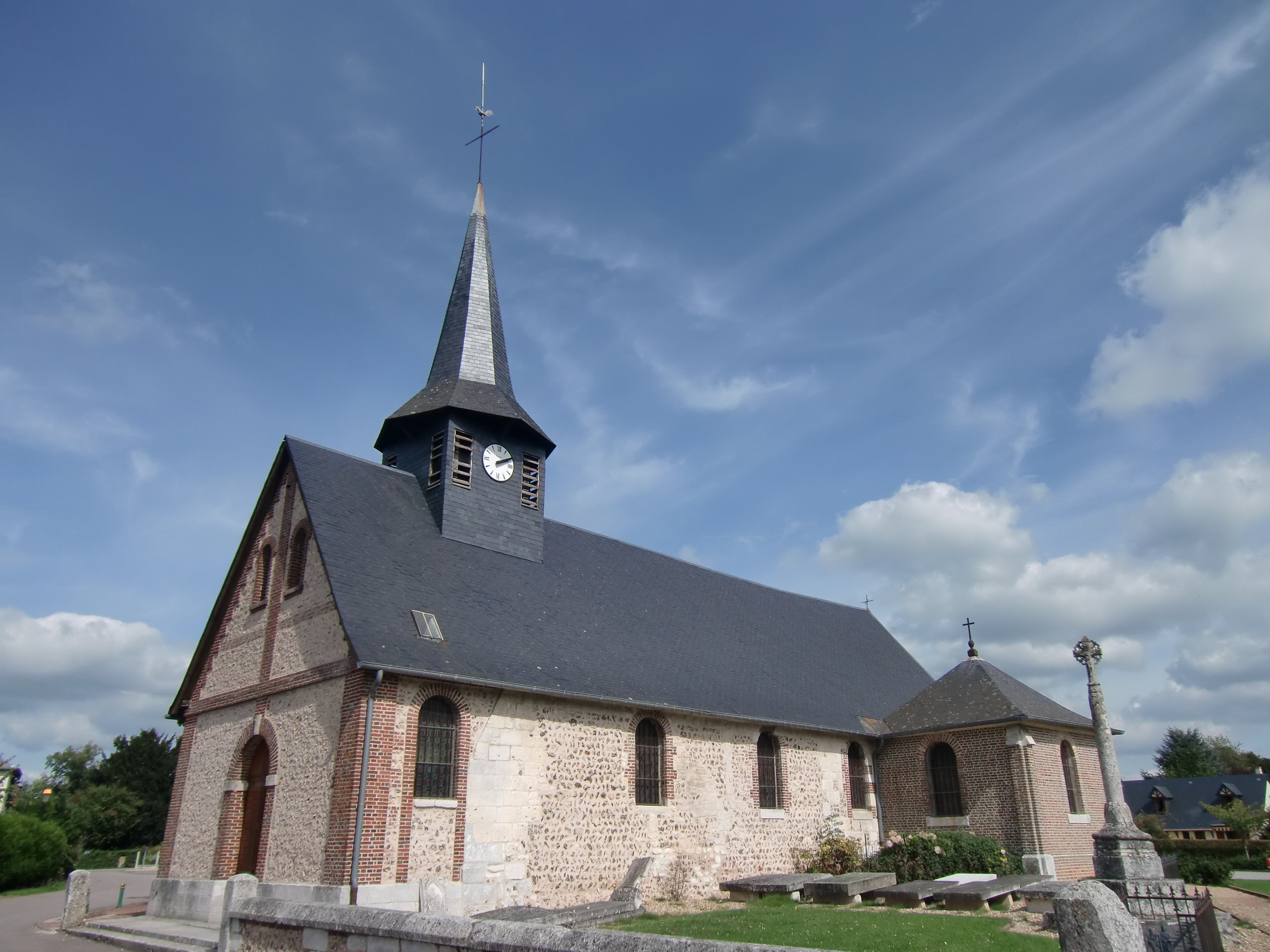
- The church in Saint-Ouen-de-Thouberville
- Location of Saint-Ouen-de-Thouberville
- Location within France Location within Normandy
- Coordinates: 49°21′27″N 0°53′19″E
- Country: France
- Region: Normandy
- Department: Eure
- Arrondissement: Bernay
- Canton: Bourg-Achard

Government
  - Mayor (2020–2026): Sandrine Menniti
- Area^{1}: 6.32 km^{2} (2.44 sq mi)
- Elevation: 142 m (466 ft)
- Highest elevation: 137 m (449 ft)
- Lowest elevation: 73 m (240 ft)
- Population (2023): 2,419
  - Density: 383/km^{2} (991/sq mi)
- Time zone: UTC+01:00 (CET)
  - Summer (DST): UTC+02:00 (CEST)
- INSEE/Postal code: 27580 /27310
- ^{1} French Land Register data, which excludes lakes, ponds, glaciers > 1 km^{2} (0.386 sq mi or 247 acres) and river estuaries.

Saint-Ouen-de-Thouberville (French pronunciation: [sɛ̃.t‿wɛ̃ də tubɛʁvil]) is a commune in the Eure department in Normandy (formerly Haute-Normandie) in north-western France.

== Population ==
Historical population

Year	Pop.	±% p.a.
1793	767	—
1800	611	−3.20%
1806	742	+3.29%
1821	825	+0.71%
1831	1,023	+2.17%
1836	1,032	+0.18%
1841	1,032	+0.00%
1846	1,055	+0.44%
1851	1,084	+0.54%
1856	1,007	−1.46%
1861	998	−0.18%
1866	888	−2.31%
1872	878	−0.19%
1876	907	+0.82%
1881	791	−2.70%
1886	750	−1.06%
1891	802	+1.35%
1896	764	−0.97%
1901	732	−0.85%

Year	Pop.	±% p.a.
1906	752	+0.54%
1911	731	−0.56%
1921	576	−2.35%
1926	626	+1.68%
1931	651	+0.79%
1936	650	−0.03%
1946	796	+2.05%
1954	825	+0.45%
1962	1,027	+2.78%
1968	1,189	+2.47%
1975	1,520	+3.57%
1982	1,524	+0.04%
1990	1,447	−0.65%
1999	1,725	+1.97%
2007	2,140	+2.73%
2012	2,316	+1.59%
2017	2,378	+0.53%
2023	2,419	+0.29%

Source: EHESS and INSEE (1968-2023)

== See also ==
- Communes of the Eure department
