= Freneuse, Yvelines =

Freneuse
- Commune
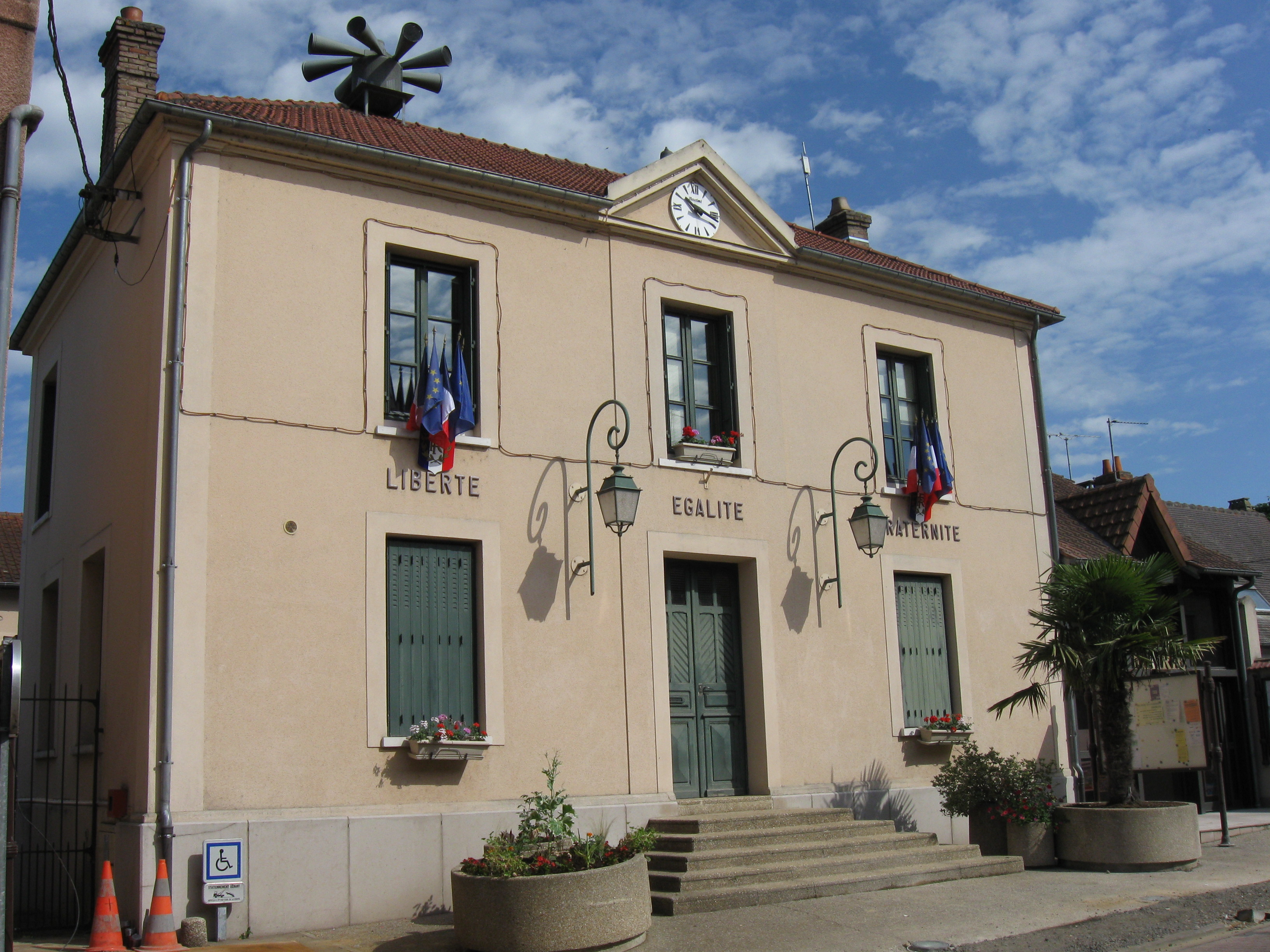
- The town hall in Freneuse

- Coat of arms
- Location of Freneuse
- Location within France Location within Île-de-France (region)
- Coordinates: 49°02′53″N 1°36′06″E
- Country: France
- Region: Île-de-France
- Department: Yvelines
- Arrondissement: Mantes-la-Jolie
- Canton: Bonnières-sur-Seine
- Intercommunality: Portes de l'Île-de-France

Government
  - Mayor (2020–2026): Ghislaine Haueter
- Area^{1}: 10.32 km^{2} (3.98 sq mi)
- Elevation: 17 m (56 ft)
- Highest elevation: 114 m (374 ft)
- Lowest elevation: 14 m (46 ft)
- Population (2023): 4,505
  - Density: 436.5/km^{2} (1,131/sq mi)
- Time zone: UTC+01:00 (CET)
  - Summer (DST): UTC+02:00 (CEST)
- INSEE/Postal code: 78255 /78840
- ^{1} French Land Register data, which excludes lakes, ponds, glaciers > 1 km^{2} (0.386 sq mi or 247 acres) and river estuaries.

Freneuse (French pronunciation: [fʁənøz]) is a commune in the Yvelines department in the Île-de-France region in north-central France.

== Population ==
Historical population
Year	Pop.	±% p.a.
1968	2,514	—
1975	3,414	+4.47%
1982	3,354	−0.25%
1990	3,694	+1.21%
1999	3,592	−0.31%
2007	3,823	+0.78%
2012	4,028	+1.05%
2017	4,411	+1.83%
2023	4,505	+0.35%
Source: INSEE

== See also ==
- Communes of the Yvelines department
