= European route E602 =

Road in trans-European E-road network

E602

Route information
- Length: 195 km (121 mi)

Major junctions
- From: La Rochelle
- To: Saintes

Location
- Countries: France

Highway system
- International E-road network; A Class; B Class

European route E 602 is a European B class road in France, connecting the cities La Rochelle and Saintes.

== Route ==
- France
  - E03 E601 La Rochelle
  - E603 Saintes
