= Tavers =

- Commune
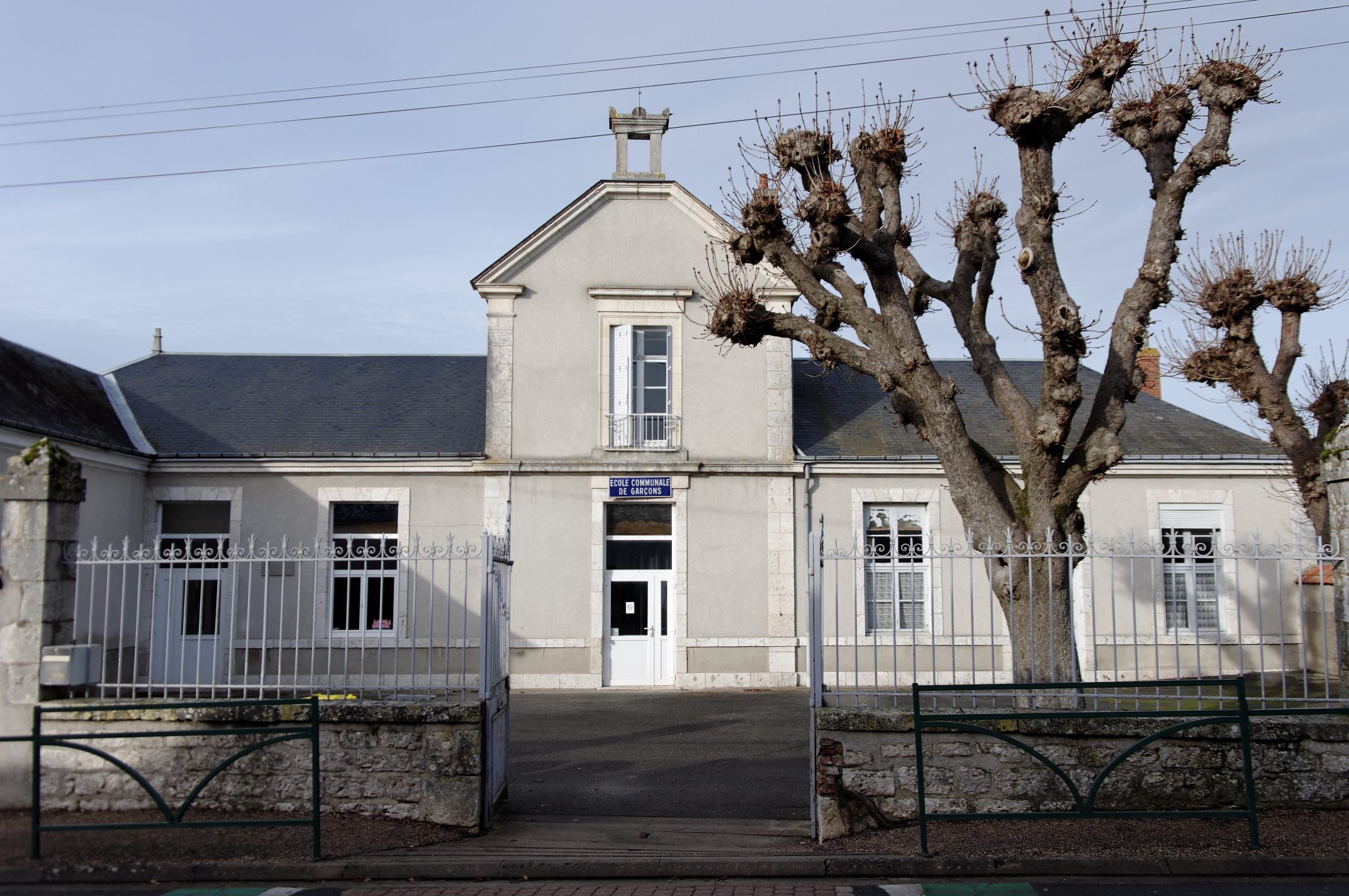
- A former school in Tavers
- Location of Tavers
- Location within France Location within Centre-Val de Loire
- Coordinates: 47°45′33″N 1°36′50″E
- Country: France
- Region: Centre-Val de Loire
- Department: Loiret
- Arrondissement: Orléans
- Canton: Beaugency

Government
  - Mayor (2020–2026): Jean-Paul Antoine
- Area^{1}: 22.62 km^{2} (8.73 sq mi)
- Highest elevation: 119 m (390 ft)
- Lowest elevation: 75 m (246 ft)
- Population (2023): 1,334
  - Density: 58.97/km^{2} (152.7/sq mi)
- Time zone: UTC+01:00 (CET)
  - Summer (DST): UTC+02:00 (CEST)
- INSEE/Postal code: 45317 /45190
- ^{1} French Land Register data, which excludes lakes, ponds, glaciers > 1 km^{2} (0.386 sq mi or 247 acres) and river estuaries.

Tavers (French pronunciation: [tavɛʁ]) is a commune in the department of Loiret, north-central France.

== Sites and monuments ==
- Several dolmens are located on the town: the rotating stone ("la pierre tournante"), the stone of green Galant, the Clos du ver
- Wash houses and mills
- The Church of St. John the Baptist the nineteenth siecle
- The chapel and fountain St. Anthony fifteenth siècle
- The viaduct ferroviaire
- The blue waters, sources from groundwater resurgence of Beauce and Loire, sometimes causing bouillon; the blue and translucent appearance of the water is due to a very weak mineralization.

=== Sites and remarkable landscapes ===
On 30 November 2000, the Loire Valley, in its middle reaches of Sully-sur-Loire (Loiret) to Chalonnes-sur-Loire (Maine-et-Loire), is inscribed on the World Heritage List of the organization of United Nations educational, Scientific and cultural Organization (UNESCO) as a "cultural landscape". This listing recognizes the site of "Outstanding Universal Value" (OUV) based on the density of its monumental, architectural and urban interest of the river landscape and the exceptional quality of the landscape inherited expressions of the Renaissance and the Enlightenment. Any deterioration in OUV is considered a loss to the memory of the Humanité. The prefect of the Centre region, coordinator Prefect, approved the management plan for the Loire Valley World Heritage by order dated November 15, 2012. Thirty-five towns in the Loiret are part of the heritage site, including Tavers.

=== Natural Heritage ===
Two Natura 2000 sites cover part of the territory of Travers: Vallée de la Loire de Tavers à Belleville-sur-Loire and Vallée de la Loire du Loiret.

== See also ==
- Communes of the Loiret department
