= Tancarville Canal =

Canal in France

Canal de Tancarville
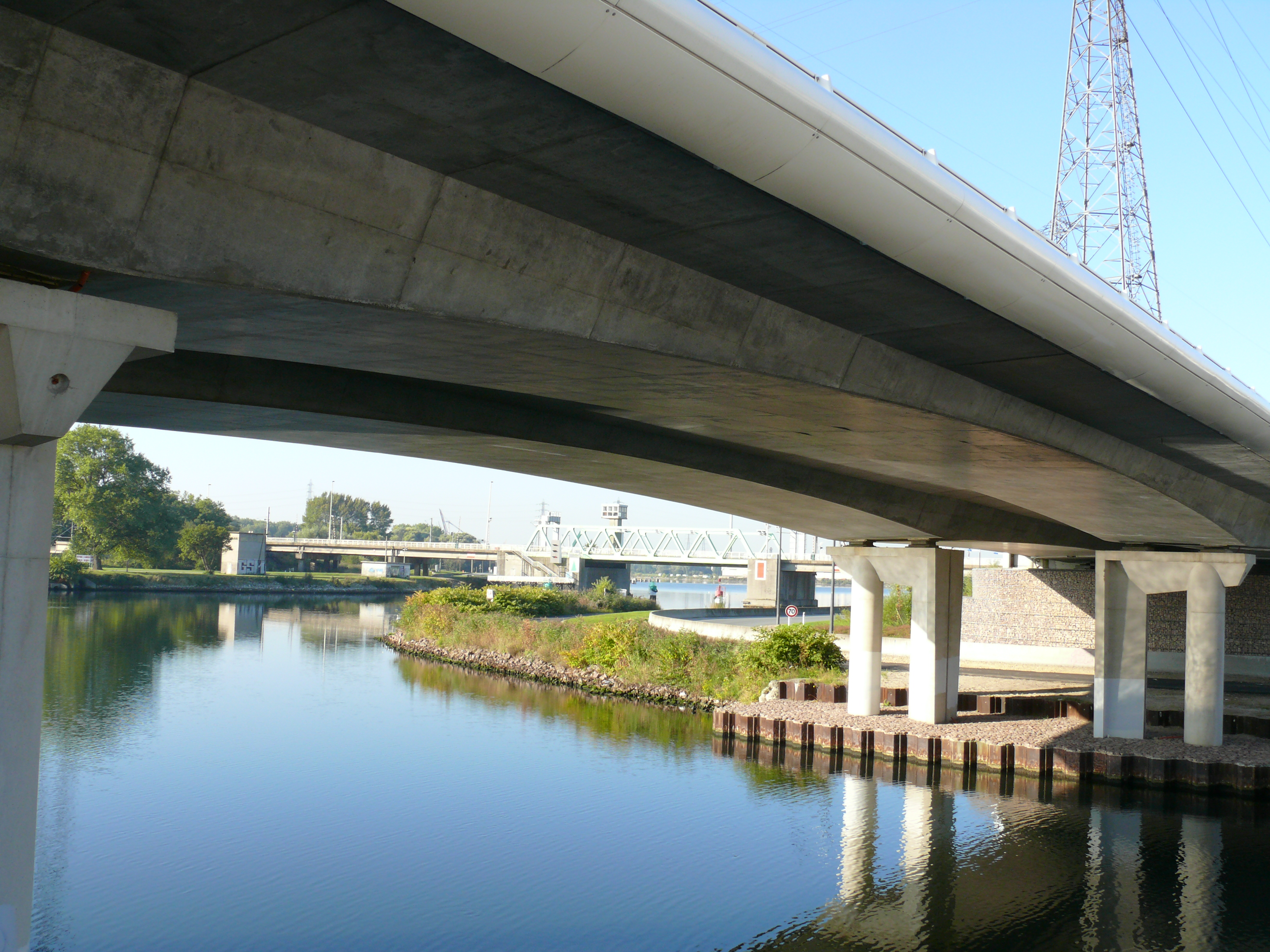

Specifications
- Length: 25 km (16 mi)
- Locks: 2

History
- Date completed: 1887

Geography
- Start point: Seine in Tancarville
- End point: English Channel in Le Havre
- Beginning coordinates: 49.4746°N 0.4618°E

The Canal de Tancarville (French pronunciation: [kanal də tɑ̃kaʁvil]) is a 25 km waterway in France connecting the English Channel at Le Havre to the Seine at Tancarville.

The canal was completed and opened in 1887.

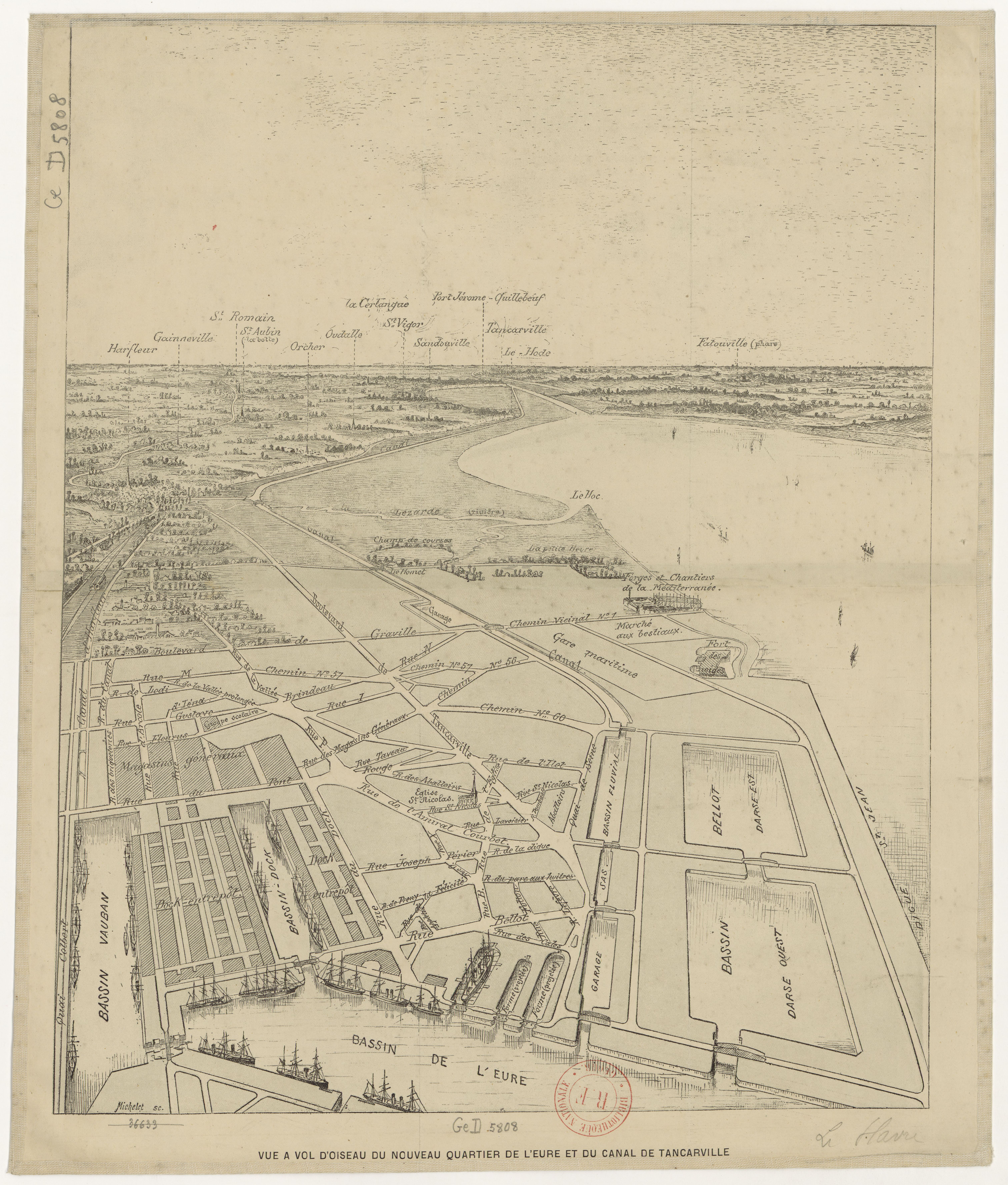
Bird's-eye view (c. 1887)

== See also ==
- List of canals in France
