= Allainville, Yvelines =

Allainville
- Commune
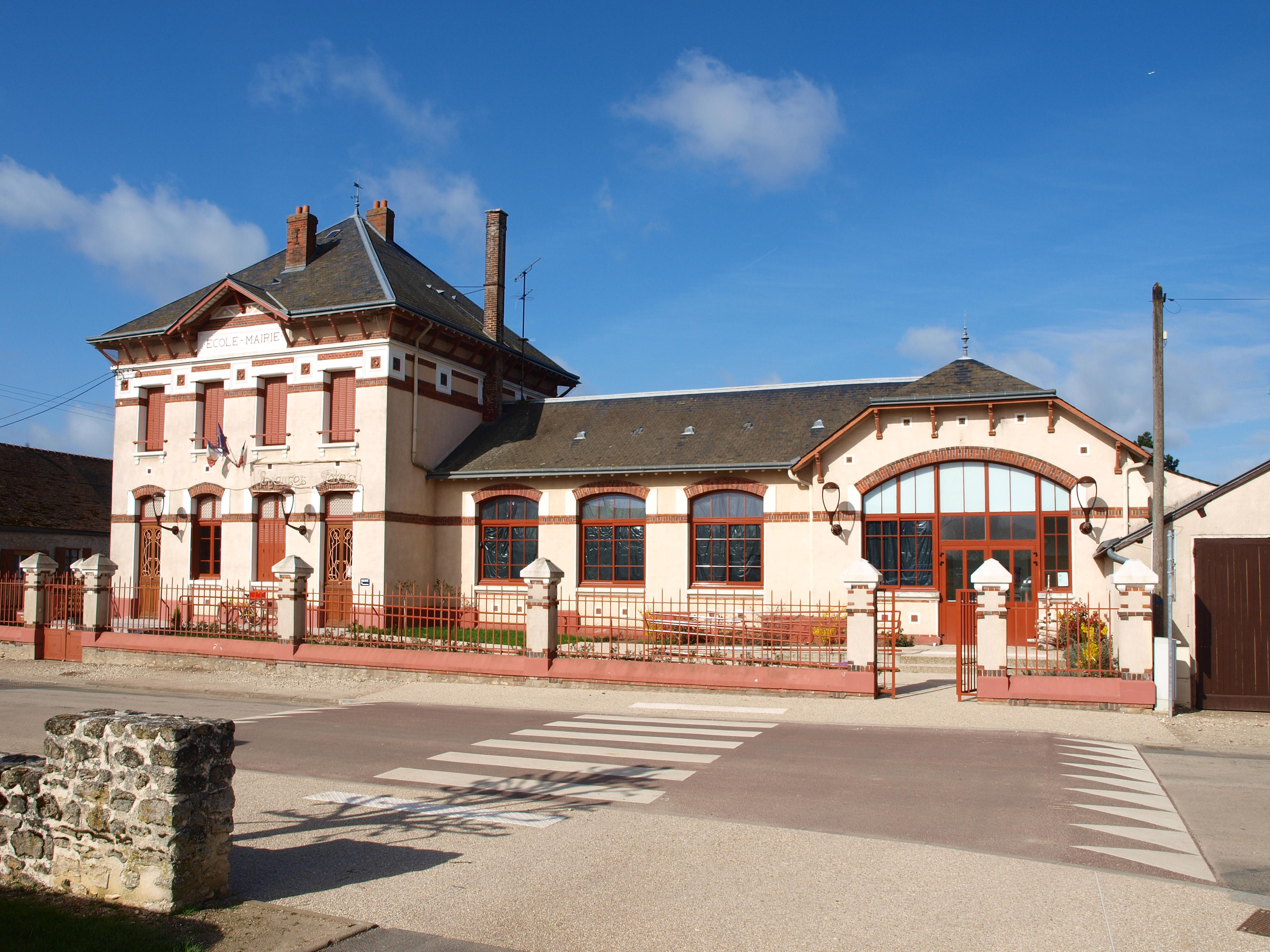
- The town hall in Allainville
- Location of Allainville
- Location within France Location within Île-de-France (region)
- Coordinates: 48°27′N 1°53′E
- Country: France
- Region: Île-de-France
- Department: Yvelines
- Arrondissement: Rambouillet
- Canton: Rambouillet
- Intercommunality: CA Rambouillet Territoires

Government
  - Mayor (2020–2026): Gilles Quinton
- Area^{1}: 16.30 km^{2} (6.29 sq mi)
- Elevation: 154 m (505 ft)
- Highest elevation: 159 m (522 ft)
- Lowest elevation: 145 m (476 ft)
- Population (2023): 281
  - Density: 17.2/km^{2} (44.6/sq mi)
- Time zone: UTC+01:00 (CET)
  - Summer (DST): UTC+02:00 (CEST)
- INSEE/Postal code: 78009 /78660
- ^{1} French Land Register data, which excludes lakes, ponds, glaciers > 1 km^{2} (0.386 sq mi or 247 acres) and river estuaries.

Allainville (French pronunciation: [alɛ̃vil]) is a commune in the Yvelines department in north-central France.

== Population ==
Historical population
Year	Pop.	±% p.a.
1968	189	—
1975	189	+0.00%
1982	181	−0.62%
1990	273	+5.27%
1999	293	+0.79%
2007	308	+0.63%
2012	292	−1.06%
2017	306	+0.94%
2023	281	−1.41%
Source: INSEE

== See also ==
- Communes of the Yvelines department
