= Saugnac-et-Muret =

- Commune
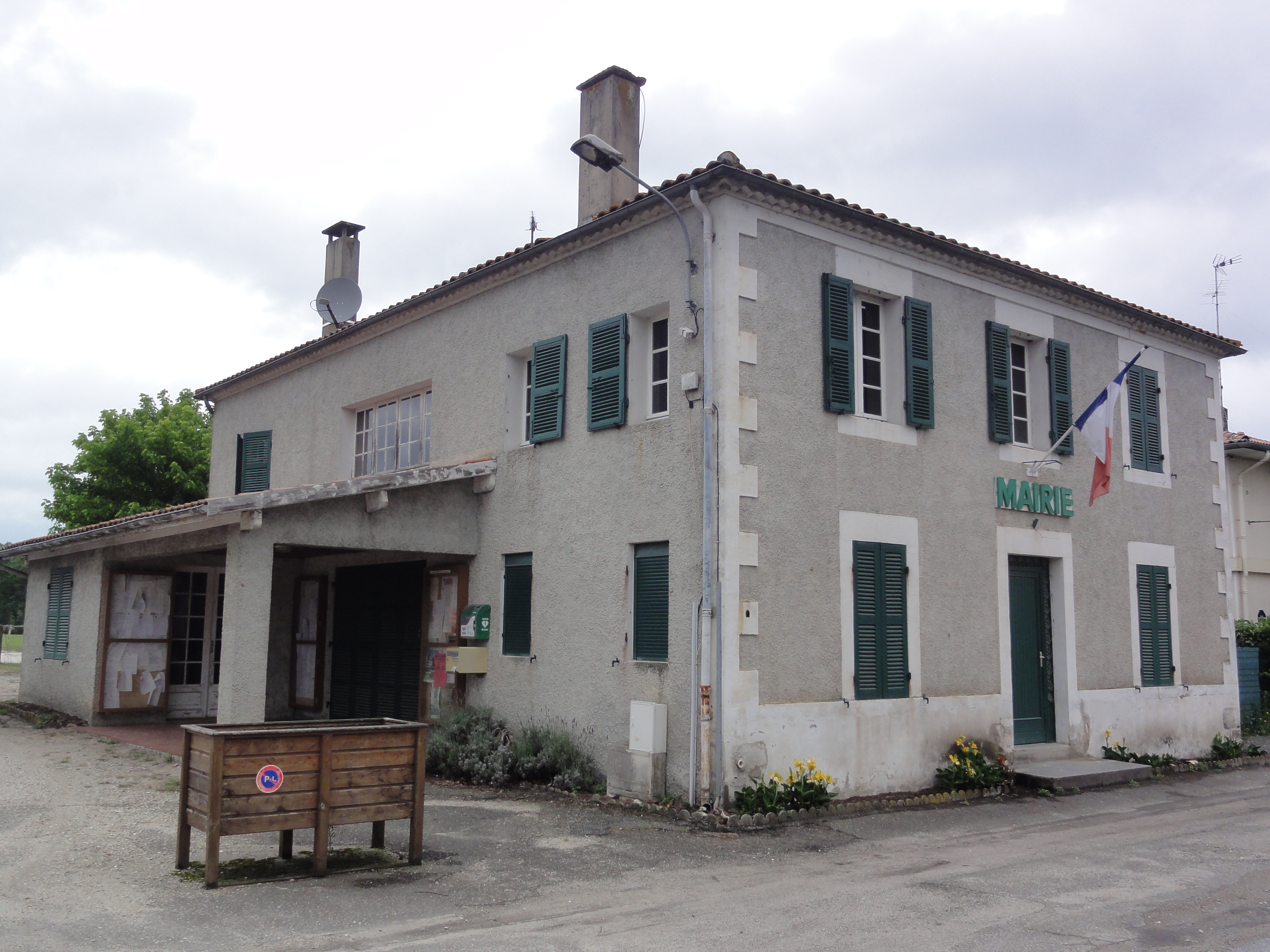
- Town hall
- Location of Saugnac-et-Muret
- Location within France Location within Nouvelle-Aquitaine
- Coordinates: 44°24′28″N 0°49′33″W
- Country: France
- Region: Nouvelle-Aquitaine
- Department: Landes
- Arrondissement: Mont-de-Marsan
- Canton: Grands Lacs

Government
  - Mayor (2020–2026): Ludovic Vaysse
- Area^{1}: 109.37 km^{2} (42.23 sq mi)
- Elevation: 46 m (151 ft)
- Highest elevation: 64 m (210 ft)
- Lowest elevation: 20 m (66 ft)
- Population (2023): 1,382
  - Density: 12.64/km^{2} (32.73/sq mi)
- Time zone: UTC+01:00 (CET)
  - Summer (DST): UTC+02:00 (CEST)
- INSEE/Postal code: 40295 /40410
- ^{1} French Land Register data, which excludes lakes, ponds, glaciers > 1 km^{2} (0.386 sq mi or 247 acres) and river estuaries.

Saugnac-et-Muret (French pronunciation: [soɲak e myʁɛ]; Occitan: Saunhac e Lo Muret; before 2022: Saugnacq-et-Muret) is a commune in the Landes department in Nouvelle-Aquitaine in southwestern France.

== Population ==
Historical population
Year	Pop.	±% p.a.
1968	676	—
1975	655	−0.45%
1982	550	−2.47%
1990	630	+1.71%
1999	712	+1.37%
2007	853	+2.28%
2012	916	+1.44%
2017	1,035	+2.47%
2023	1,382	+4.94%
Source: INSEE

== See also ==
- Communes of the Landes department
- Parc naturel régional des Landes de Gascogne
