= Marais-Vernier =

- Commune
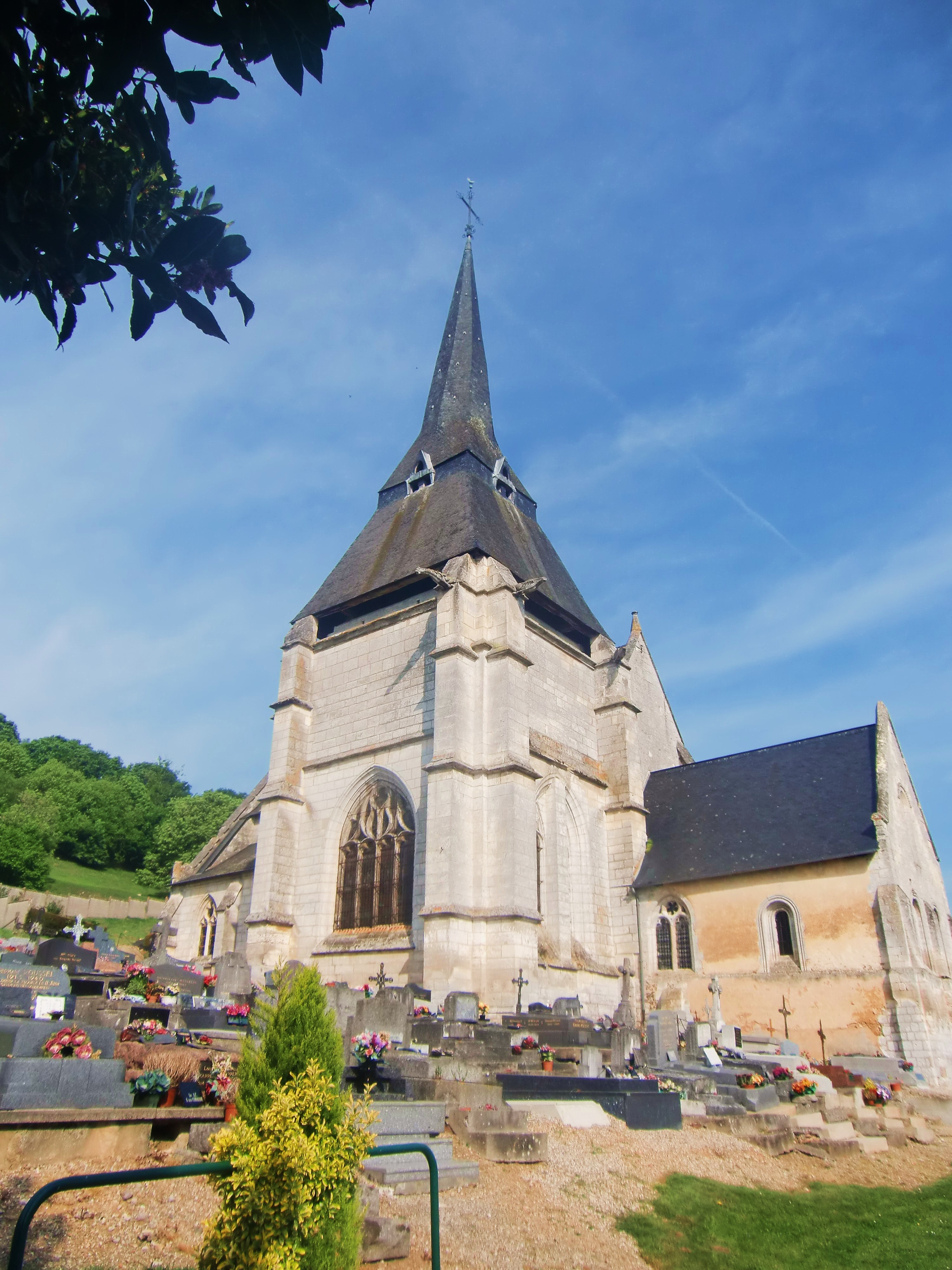
- The church in Marais-Vernier
- Location of Marais-Vernier
- Location within France Location within Normandy
- Coordinates: 49°25′26″N 0°27′16″E
- Country: France
- Region: Normandy
- Department: Eure
- Arrondissement: Bernay
- Canton: Bourg-Achard

Government
  - Mayor (2020–2026): William Calmesnil
- Area^{1}: 24.98 km^{2} (9.64 sq mi)
- Elevation: 10 m (33 ft)
- Highest elevation: 113 m (371 ft)
- Lowest elevation: 0 m (0 ft)
- Population (2023): 469
  - Density: 18.8/km^{2} (48.6/sq mi)
- Time zone: UTC+01:00 (CET)
  - Summer (DST): UTC+02:00 (CEST)
- INSEE/Postal code: 27388 /27680
- ^{1} French Land Register data, which excludes lakes, ponds, glaciers > 1 km^{2} (0.386 sq mi or 247 acres) and river estuaries.

Marais-Vernier (French pronunciation: [maʁɛ vɛʁnje]) is a commune in the Eure department in Normandy in northern France. It is situated near the left bank of the Seine, at the edge of a wetland (the Marais Vernier) formed by an old branch of the Seine. The wetland was cut off from the river with dams in the 17th century. Part of it is used for farming (cattle, Camargue horses, Scottish Highland Cattle), part is a protected area which is important for birds like storks. The village itself is situated on the edge of the wetland.

== Population ==
Historical population
Year	Pop.	±% p.a.
1968	495	—
1975	502	+0.20%
1982	464	−1.12%
1990	480	+0.42%
1999	455	−0.59%
2007	500	+1.19%
2012	500	+0.00%
2017	508	+0.32%
2023	469	−1.32%
Source: INSEE

== See also ==
- Communes of the Eure department
