= Canton of Marquise =

Coordinates: 50°49′41″N 1°41′29″E

Marquise
- Former canton
- Interactive map of Marquise
- Country: France
- Region: Hauts-de-France
- Department: Pas-de-Calais
- No. of communes: {{{nbcomm}}}
- Disbanded: 2015
- Area: 183.34 km^{2} (70.79 sq mi)
- Population (2012): 21,997
  - Density: 119.98/km^{2} (310.74/sq mi)

The canton of Marquise is a former canton situated in the department of the Pas-de-Calais and in the Nord-Pas-de-Calais region of northern France. It was disbanded following the French canton reorganisation which came into effect in March 2015. It consisted of 21 communes, which joined the canton of Desvres in 2015. It had a total of 21,997 inhabitants (2012).

== Geography ==
The canton is organised around Marquise in the arrondissement of Boulogne-sur-Mer. The altitude varies from 0m (Ambleteuse) to 163m (Leubringhen) for an average altitude of 72m.

The canton comprised 21 communes:

- Ambleteuse
- Audembert
- Audinghen
- Audresselles
- Bazinghen
- Beuvrequen
- Ferques
- Hervelinghen
- Landrethun-le-Nord
- Leubringhen
- Leulinghen-Bernes
- Maninghen-Henne
- Marquise
- Offrethun
- Rety
- Rinxent
- Saint-Inglevert
- Tardinghen
- Wacquinghen
- Wierre-Effroy
- Wissant

== Population ==
Population Evolution
1962	1968	1975	1982	1990	1999
17652	18384	18467	18977	19701	20561
Census count starting from 1962 : Population without double counting

== See also ==
- Cantons of Pas-de-Calais
- Communes of Pas-de-Calais
- Arrondissements of the Pas-de-Calais department
