= Saint-Inglevert Airfield =

Airport in Saint-Inglevert, France

Saint-Inglevert
- Aerial view of Saint-Inglevert Airfield.
- IATA: none; ICAO: LFIS

Summary
- Airport type: Public
- Owner/Operator: Aéroclub du Boulonnais
- Location: Saint-Inglevert, Pas-de-Calais, France
- Elevation AMSL: 130 m (430 ft)
- Coordinates: 50°52′57″N 1°44′40″E

Map
- Location within Nord-Pas-de-Calais

Runways
Direction	Length		Surface
Direction	m	ft	Surface
03/21	630	2,070	Concrete

Saint-Inglevert Airfield is a general aviation airfield at Saint-Inglevert, Pas-de-Calais,^{[Note 1]} France. In the First World War an airfield was established near Saint-Inglevert by the Royal Flying Corps, later passing to the Royal Air Force on formation.

In 1920, a civil airfield was established on a different site which was a designated customs airfield. During the Second World War, Saint-Inglevert was occupied by the Royal Air Force and the Armée de l'Air. The airfield was captured by the Germans towards the end of the Battle of France and occupied by the Luftwaffe. It was abandoned in 1941, but in 1943 field artillery units were based around the airfield as part of the Atlantic Wall. Although civil flying returned to Saint-Inglevert post-war, the airfield was abandoned in 1957 and returned to agriculture. It was reopened by l'Aéroclub du Boulonnais (English: Boulogne Aero Club) in 1986.

== Location ==
Saint-Inglevert airfield is located on a 130-metre-high (430 ft) hill to the north west of the village of Saint-Inglevert, and east of Hervelinghen. It lies 13 kilometres (8 mi) south west of Calais.

== History ==
=== First World War ===
There was a Royal Flying Corps airfield at Saint-Inglevert during the First World War, but not on the site of the current airfield. In April 1918, No. 21 Squadron Royal Air Force (RAF) were based at Saint-Inglevert, flying Royal Aircraft Factory R.E.8 aircraft. From 29 June to 23 October, No. 214 Squadron RAF were based there flying Handley Page O/400s, and in November, they were replaced by No. 115 Squadron RAF, who were flying the same type of aircraft. Two more squadrons, No. 97 Squadron RAF and No. 100 Squadron RAF, were based there from 17 November, to be joined by two squadrons of the United States Navy in 1918, flying Sopwith Camels. All Royal Air Force squadrons departed from Saint-Inglevert on 4 March 1919.

=== Between the wars ===
In 1920, an airfield was established at Saint-Inglevert on a different site to the former military airfield. Facilities developed over the years to include two hangars, customs facilities and ultra short wave radio. In March 1920, a Notice to Airmen was issued stating that Saint-Inglevert was open and fuel, oil and water were available, but there were no hangars or repair facilities. A proposal to designate Saint-Inglevert as a customs airfield in order to relieve Le Bourget of some of its workload was made in April 1920. Facilities then in existence included hangars, repair facilities and a radio station. Later that month, it was notified^{[Note 2]} that an aerial lighthouse had been installed at the airfield, flashing the Morse letter A, and Saint-Inglevert became a customs airport on 20 May. By July, the provision of ground signals at Saint-Inglevert had begun. A 10-metre-long (33 ft) arrow was displayed indicating the wind direction. In August, it was reported that Saint-Inglevert was sending weather report by radio seven times a day to Le Bourget. By October, aids available included a windsock and a landing T. Requirements for aircraft to perform clockwise or anticlockwise circuits when landing were indicated by the flying of a red or white flag respectively. The aerial lighthouse was reported to be out of action in November 1920.

It was notified that the road forming the eastern boundary of the airfield was to be marked by a series of posts 1 m (3 ft 3 in) high, surmounted by vertical white discs 50 cm (20 in) in diameter, in January 1921, and the following month, a Notice to Airmen issued in the United Kingdom stated that radio communication with Saint-Inglevert was to be in French. As part of a series of trials to assess the viability of civil aviation in France, a Farman F.60 Goliath flew a 4,500-kilometre (2,800 mi) test flight carrying 2,250 kg (4,960 lb) of cargo on 1 May. Three laps of a circuit Paris – Orléans – Rouen – Saint-Inglevert – Metz – Dijon – Paris were flown. Saint-Inglevert was one of the designated landing places for the 1921 Coupe Michelin, an aerial circuit of France with a ₣20,000 prize. In November, a Compagnie des Messageries Aériennes aircraft called at Saint-Inglevert to collect a cargo of six 18-pounder and three 4.5–inch live shells for onward transmission to Croydon Airport in Surrey, United Kingdom. In a paper read to the Royal Aeronautical Society on 17 November, Colonel Frank Searle, managing director of Daimler Airway, criticized the organization of Saint-Inglevert and Le Bourget.

In or about March 1922, the wireless station at Saint-Inglevert was destroyed in a fire. A meeting of airlines and the British Air Ministry in April following the 1922 Picardie mid-air collision on 7 April at Thieuloy-Saint-Antoine, Oise resulted in a number of resolutions being passed with the intention of improving the safety of aviation, one of which was that the Saint-Inglevert wireless station should be replaced. The aerial lighthouse at Saint-Inglevert was in operation again by 11 April, when a test flight was flown at night on the British part of the London – Paris air route. The aircraft flew as far as Saint-Inglevert before turning back and landing at Lympne, Kent. In December, a Notice to Airmen stated that a portable searchlight was in operation at Saint-Inglevert by prior arrangement for aircraft landing at night, and that the "T" was illuminated at night.

In April 1923, a ₣25,000 prize (then worth £360) was offered by the daily newspaper Le Matin for the first French aviator to fly from Saint-Inglevert to Lympne and back in one day in an aircraft of French design and construction, with an engine capacity of less than 1,100 cubic centimetres (67 cu in). Georges Barbot won the prize when he completed the journey during the evening of 6 May in a Dewoitine aircraft fitted with a Clerget engine. It took him 2 hours and 25 minutes, including a 40-minute stop at Lympne while one of the struts supporting the undercarriage was repaired.

Imperial Airways were operating cross-channel services using Armstrong Whitworth Argosy aircraft in 1924, with the first stop in France at Saint-Inglevert. When an aircraft departed from Lympne for St Inglevert, the destination airfield was advised, and if arrival was not notified within two hours, the British coastguard was informed. Communication between the airfields used Carmichael Microway UHF transmitters. A new system was introduced for non-radio aircraft crossing the English Channel in August. Aircraft crossing from Lympne to Ostend, Belgium had to make a circuit of the airfield at an altitude of 1,000 ft (300 m), while two circuits were made if departing for Saint-Inglevert. The destination was then informed by radio of the departure. Arrival was confirmed by the aircraft flying another circuit, and was then reported back to Lympne by radio. If the aircraft had not arrived within an hour of departure, it would be considered as missing. A similar arrangement applied for aircraft flying in the reverse direction. In September, Saint-Inglevert was one of the landing points for an aerial "Tour de France", in which a specified route had to be flown on a 2,120-kilometre (1,320 mi) course. Sixteen aircraft competed in four classes.

The airfield has been involved in several aviation records. On 18 September 1928, Juan de la Cierva completed the first cross-Channel flight in an autogyro when he landed there after departing from Lympne in a Cierva C.8. Lissant Beardmore completed the first cross-Channel flight in a glider on 19 June 1931. He took off from Lympne and was towed by an aircraft to an altitude of 14,000 ft (4,300 m), landing at Saint-Inglevert after a flight of one and a half hours to the surprise of the airfield manager. The first double crossing of the Channel in a glider was made by Austrian Robert Kronfeld on 20 June. In a glider called Wien, he took off from Saint-Inglevert by means of an aero-tow to an altitude of 5,000 ft (1,500 m), and landed at the former RAF Swingfield airfield near Dover, Kent. From Swingfield, another aero-tow to an altitude of 10,000 ft (3,000 m) enabled him to return to Saint-Inglevert. Kronfeld received a £1,000 prize from the Daily Mail for his flights, which were verified by the British Gliding Association. On 10 September 1929, Charles Fauvel departed from Saint-Inglevert in a Mauboussin aircraft fitted with an ABC Scorpion engine. The 848-kilometre (527 mi) flight to Pau set a new Fédération Aéronautique Internationale world record for distance flown by a single seat aircraft weighing less than 200 kg (440 lb).

In November 1932, it was reported that new radio equipment was to be installed at Lympne and St Inglevert operating on the 15 centimetre waveband at 2,000 MHz, which would be used for the announcement of departures of non-radio aircraft across the Channel. Messages sent by radio were also printed out by a teleprinter, providing a record of the communication. The British Air Ministry and the French Ministère de l'Air co-operated in the arrangements for setting up the system, which was scheduled to come into operation in Spring 1933. It proved its effectiveness on 7 March 1933, when a non-radio de Havilland DH.60 Moth of British Air Transport failed to arrive at Lympne. The aircraft had ditched in the Channel and both occupants were rescued by a steamship bound for Amsterdam, the Netherlands. A new short-wave radio system came into operation on 16 January 1934, using equipment manufactured by Le Matériel Téléphonique, Paris.

In the mid-1930s, a number of notable people used Saint-Inglevert Airfield. King Edward VIII made three visits, the first on 4 February 1935, while still the Prince of Wales, when he arrived from Fort Belvedere, Surrey on the first part of a journey to take a holiday at Kitzbühel, Austria. As king, he departed on 26 July 1936 to RAF Hendon on his return from the ceremony to unveil the Canadian National Vimy Memorial, and flew in from the Great West Aerodrome, Harmondsworth, UK on 8 August, in order to catch the Orient Express at Calais, as part of a holiday in Yugoslavia. Henri Mignet flew from Saint-Inglevert to Lympne on 13 August 1935, in his Flying Flea, then the world's smallest aircraft.

=== Second World War ===
Following the outbreak of the Second World War, Saint-Inglevert was taken over by the Armée de l'Air in December 1939. Groupe Aérien d'Observation 516 (GAO 516) of the 16ème Corps d'Armée (English: Air Observation Group 516 of the 16th Army Corps) were based here, operating five Potez 63-11 and five Breguet 27 aircraft, and carrying out air reconnaissance over the Nord-Pas de Calais region. "B" Flight, No. 615 Squadron RAF was stationed at Saint-Inglevert in the early months of 1940, equipped with Gloster Gladiator II aircraft.^{[Note 3]} Following the discovery of a dismantled Morane-Saulnier MS.138 in one of the hangars, a wager was made between the British and French as to whether or not the aircraft could be returned to the air. With the aid of materials supplied by the French, the aircraft was made flyable, but when 615 Squadron received orders to relocate to Vitry-en-Artois, an attempt to fly the aircraft to the new base was unsuccessful, and a forced landing had to be made in a field. On 10 May 1940, the airfield was attacked by the Luftwaffe, with over 110 bombs being dropped, resulting in a Breguet being destroyed, another Breguet and a Potez being severely damaged and the radio facilities being temporarily put out of action.

During April 1940, No. 607 Squadron RAF was based at Saint-Inglevert, flying Gloster Gladiator Mk II HR aircraft. The military commander General Maxime Weygand visited the airfield on 21 May, and ordered 516 GAO to prepare to evacuate as the Germans were in the neighbouring Somme department. The following day, the order came to evacuate to Boos airfield, Rouen, Normandy, but only four of the ten aircraft that departed from Saint-Inglevert arrived safely at Boos. All aircraft carried as many passengers as could be accommodated. Two Potez 63-11's and a Bloch MB.152 were abandoned at Saint-Inglevert, and were destroyed to prevent their use by the enemy, as were supplies of fuel. Personnel from 516 GAO were evacuated from Dunkirk on the French destroyer Bourrasque, although nineteen of them were killed when the ship struck a mine and sank.

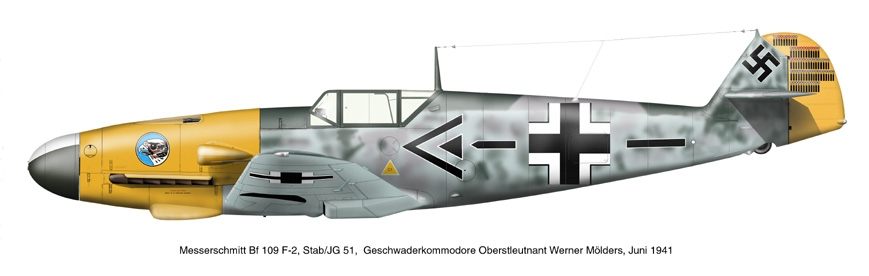
Messerschmitt Bf 109 F-2 of Werner Mölders, leader of Jagdgeschwader 51 at the time it was based at Saint-Inglevert

Saint-Inglevert was captured by the Luftwaffe towards the end of the Battle of France. 1 Gruppe, Lehrgeschwader 2 moved in on 20 June, equipped with Messerschmitt Bf 109 aircraft. They departed for Jever, Germany, on 12 July, and were replaced by 1 Gruppe, Jagdgeschwader 51, also equipped with Bf 109s. From August until November Stab JG 51 were in occupation, and Aufklärungsgruppe 32(H) aircraft were also based at Saint-Inglevert during this period, with the unit operating Henschel Hs 126 parasol monoplanes. On 30 July 1940, Saint-Inglevert was bombed by the Royal Air Force, who claimed that hangars and aircraft were damaged, and a subsequent raid on 19 August resulted in a fire, smoke from which could be seen in Kent.

From 24 September to 5 November, 2 Gruppe, Jagdgeschwader 27 were based there. Facilities at the airfield were improved, by erecting new hangars and constructing a new 600-by-50-metre (1,970 ft × 160 ft) concrete runway. On 27 December 1940, Saint-Inglevert was again bombed by the Royal Air Force. The airfield was largely abandoned by 1941, with occasional use by Junkers Ju 52s as a refuelling station.

In 1943, the airfield was designated as Stützpunkt 134 Paderborn, housing defence units as part of the Atlantic Wall coastal fortifications. The units were equipped with 10.5 cm leFH 18 howitzers. During the winter of 1943–44, 10.5 cm leFH 324(f) howitzers replaced the leFH 18s. A number of concrete bunkers were constructed to house the guns, which were still standing around the airfield in October 2007. Following Operation Overlord at the start of the Allied invasion of western Europe, the Germans committed various acts of sabotage on departure from Saint-Inglevert.

=== Post-war ===
Post-war, the airfield was restored to operational condition and civil flying returned. On 10 April 1957, a report was published which resulted in the abandonment of Saint-Inglevert in favour of an airport 6 km (4 mi) east of Calais. The airfield was returned to agriculture.

In 1986, l'Aéroclub du Boulonnais took over Saint-Inglevert following closure of their previous base at Ambleteuse. Since its closure, the runway had been used as a dump for old tyres and scrap vehicles, and it took three years to restore the airfield, which reopened on 30 July 1989. On the night of 5–6 April 2010, a fire in a hangar at Saint-Inglevert destroyed the hangar and eight aircraft. The destroyed aircraft were replaced by a Robin DR300, a Robin DR400, a Piel Emeraude CP3005 and a Jodel D195. A Piper PA-28 was also acquired which needed restoration to make it airworthy. The replacement aircraft were housed in a 10-by-10-metre (33 ft × 33 ft) tent hangar erected on the airfield, or temporarily outstationed at Calais or Le Touquet. A new 30-by-20-metre (98 ft × 66 ft) hangar, replacing the one destroyed by the fire, was officially opened on 30 March 2012, and can accommodate ten aircraft. Following the fire, a NOTAM was issued temporarily restricting the use of the airfield until 15 November 2010 to aircraft based there. On 26 August 2010, Saint-Inglevert was given the ICAO identifier LFIS, allowing it to be classed as a public airfield instead of a private one. This had taken ten years to achieve.

== Accidents and incidents ==
- On 1 September 1922, A Farman F.60 Goliath on a flight from Croydon Airport to Paris, suffered a severely damaged propeller after flying through torrential rain whilst crossing the English Channel. The engine was shut down and a precautionary landing was made at Saint-Inglevert where the propeller was changed in 15 minutes. The aircraft then departed for Le Bourget, where arrival was only 12 minutes later than scheduled.
- In February 1923, an aircraft belonging to Instone Air Line was damaged in an accident at Saint-Inglevert.

== Notes ==
1. All locations are in the Pas-de-Calais Département unless indicated otherwise.
2. The phrase "it was notified" indicates that a Notice to Airmen had been issued by either the British Civil Aviation Authority or the French Direction Générale de l'Aviation Civile as appropriate. A Notice to Airmen was called a NOTAM after 1948.
3. Although 615 Squadron were re-equipping with Hawker Hurricanes during this period, "B" flight were still equipped with Gladiators, evidence for this being a photograph of them at Vitry-en-Artois in January 1940.

== Sources ==
- Collyer, David G (1992). Lympne Airport in old photographs. Stroud: Alan Sutton Publishing Ltd. ISBN 0-7509-0169-1.
