= Boos, Seine-Maritime =

Boos
- Commune
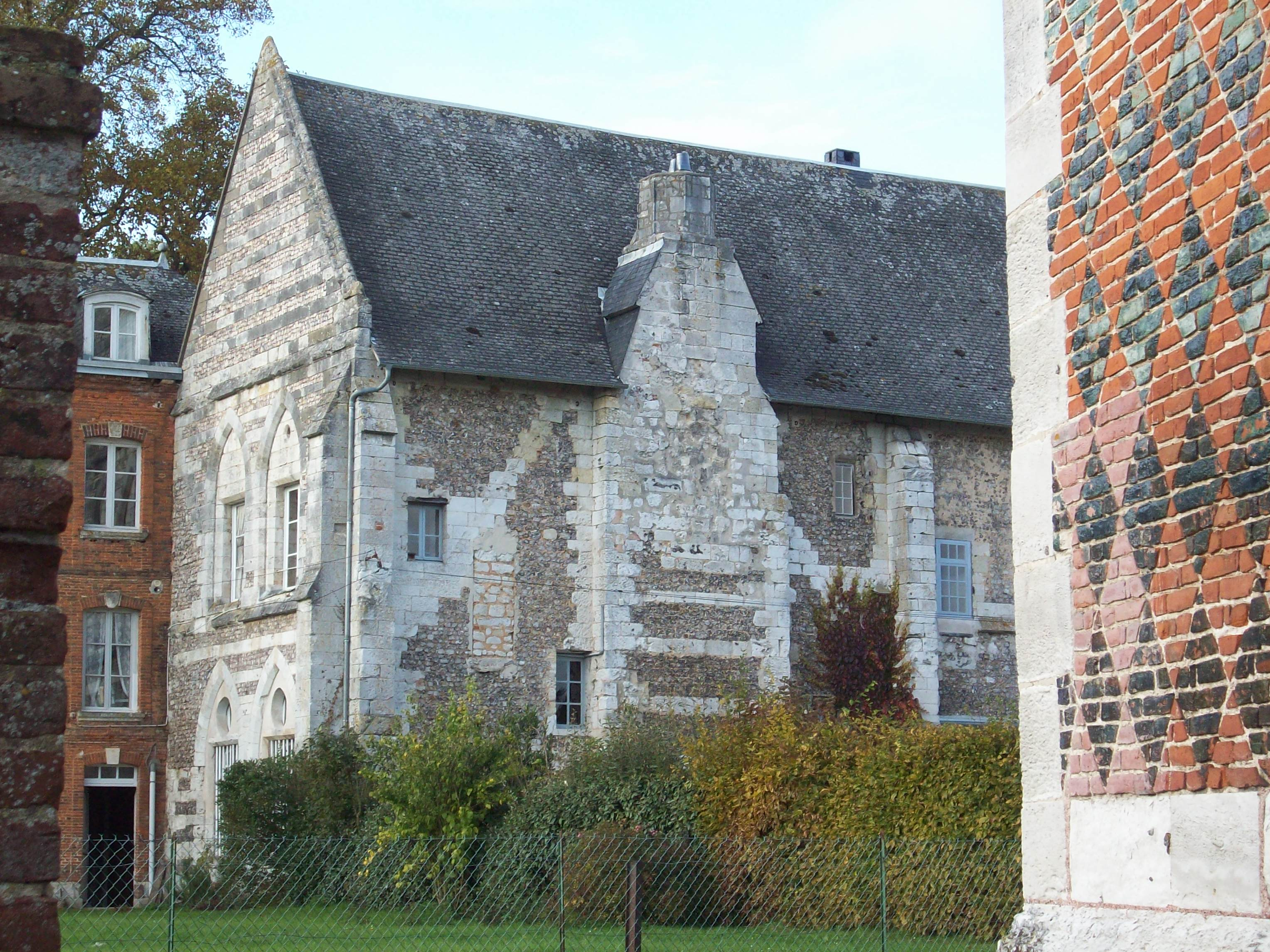
- The manor of the abbey of Saint-Amand

- Coat of arms
- Location of Boos
- Location within France Location within Normandy
- Coordinates: 49°23′19″N 1°12′14″E
- Country: France
- Region: Normandy
- Department: Seine-Maritime
- Arrondissement: Rouen
- Canton: Le Mesnil-Esnard
- Intercommunality: Métropole Rouen Normandie

Government
  - Mayor (2026–32): Bruno Grisel
- Area^{1}: 14.03 km^{2} (5.42 sq mi)
- Elevation: 160 m (520 ft)
- Highest elevation: 161 m (528 ft)
- Lowest elevation: 67 m (220 ft)
- Population (2023): 3,975
  - Density: 283.3/km^{2} (733.8/sq mi)
- Time zone: UTC+01:00 (CET)
  - Summer (DST): UTC+02:00 (CEST)
- INSEE/Postal code: 76116 /76520
- ^{1} French Land Register data, which excludes lakes, ponds, glaciers > 1 km^{2} (0.386 sq mi or 247 acres) and river estuaries.

Boos (French pronunciation: [bos]) is a commune in the Seine-Maritime department in the Normandy region in northern France.

== Geography ==
A farming and light industrial town situated some 6 miles (9.7 km) south of Rouen at the junction of the D6014, D491 and the D138 roads. Rouen Airport takes up around 25% of the area of the commune's territory.

== Heraldry ==
Arms of Boos	The arms of Boos are blazoned : Gules, a crozier head argent, on a chief azure 3 fleurs de lys Or.

== Population ==
Historical population
Year	Pop.	±% p.a.
1968	767	—
1975	1,012	+4.04%
1982	1,236	+2.90%
1990	2,487	+9.13%
1999	2,870	+1.60%
2007	3,096	+0.95%
2012	3,334	+1.49%
2017	3,810	+2.71%
2023	3,975	+0.71%
Source: INSEE

== Places of interest ==
- The church of St.Sauveur, dating from the sixteenth century.
- A manorhouse dating from the thirteenth century.
- Vestiges of a feudal castle.
- A sixteenth century dovecote, decorated with glazed tiles.

== See also ==
- Communes of the Seine-Maritime department
