= Fort Mahon =

- Fort d'Ambleteuse or Fort Vauban
- Near Ambleteuse in Pas-de-Calais in France
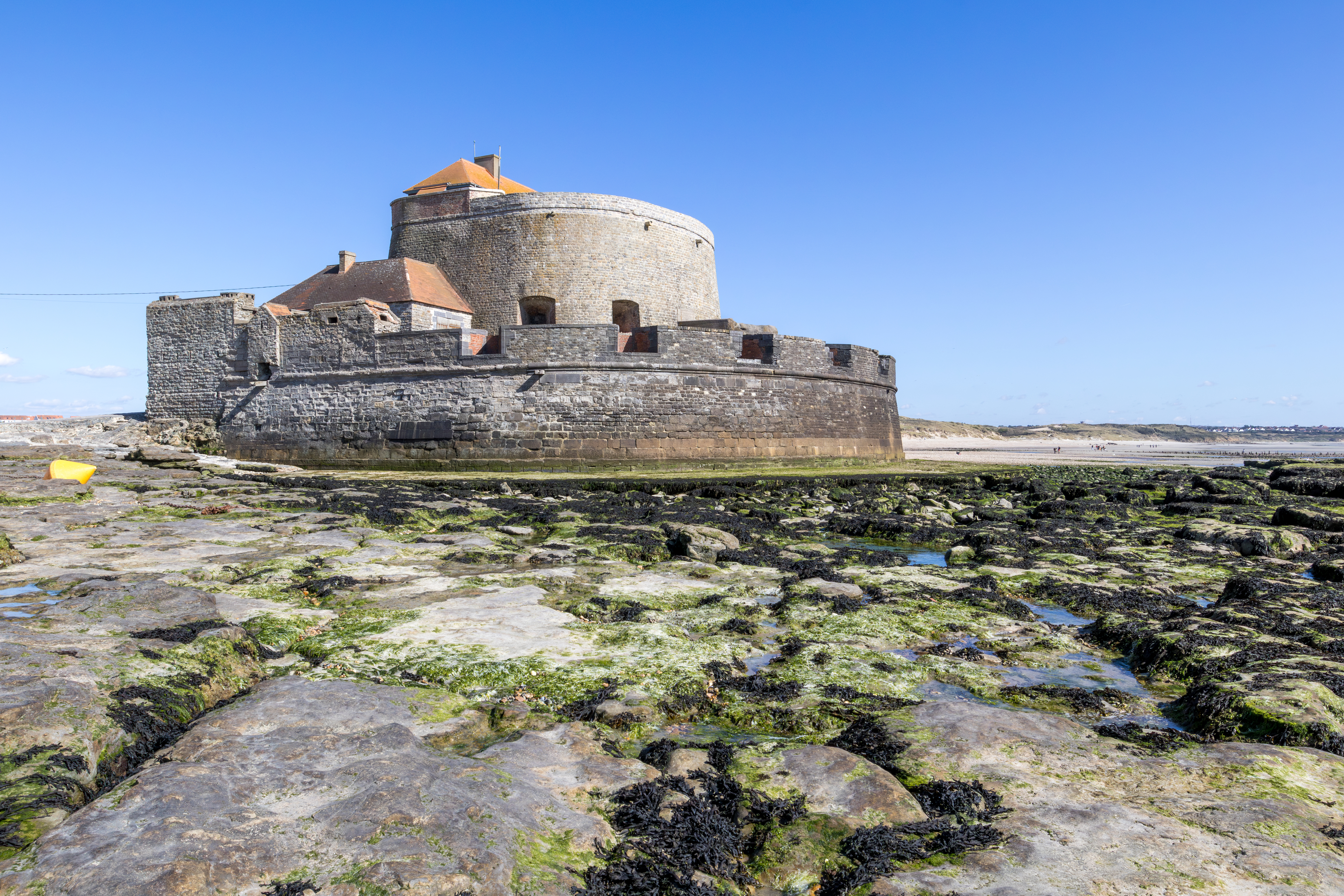
- View of Fort d'Ambleteuse

Site information
- Owner: Association of Friends of the Fort Ambleteuse
- Open to the public: yes
- Condition: Restored
- Purpose: Coastal artillery
- Website: http://asso.nordnet.fr/fortdambleteuse/Accueil.html

Location
- Coordinates: 50°48′19″N 1°36′02″E
- Height: 15 m (49 ft)

Site history
- Built: 1680
- Built by: Sébastien Le Prestre de Vauban
- In use: 17th century to 1945
- Materials: Stone

Garrison information
- Garrison: French Army

Fort Mahon (French: Fort d'Ambleteuse or Fort Vauban) is a sea fort by the commune of Ambleteuse in the Pas-de-Calais, northern France. The fort was built at the end of the 17th century by the military architect Vauban on the orders of Louis XIV to defend the port in the estuary of the Slack. It was designated a Monument historique in the 1960s.

== Name ==
The original title of the fort or tower is Ambleteuse in all official documents including the Napoleonic cadastre of 1803. However, the name Fort Mahon, which is used in English, did not appear until in 1840 and is probably the result of an administrative or transcription error.

On October 19, 1965, the government of France classified the fort as a historical monument. However, the decree stated that although the fortification was named Ambleteuse it was also sometimes called Fort Mahon. The private heritage group that manages the site adheres to what they consider to be the official name: Fort of Ambleteuse.

== History ==
Work to build Fort Ambleteuse at the mouth of the Slack was completed in 1680. Vauban sited the fortification at a point one can only access at low tide. Its defences consisted of a five-piece coastal artillery battery situated within a stone-lined bastion (or casemate), with seaward facing embrasures set in walls up to 3 m (9.8 ft) thick. An outer sea wall provided further protection for the inner scarp's gun terrace. To the landward side, Vauban built a small parade ground and living quarters for the fort's garrison. The landward walls had embrasures for muskets and small cannons.

The gun platform within the bastion was once was a large open space but German forces during the Second World War added a concrete partition that cut the space in half. They also added a pillbox to the inner side of the fort to strengthen its landward defences.

During their occupation of France, the Germans used the fort to imprison foreign forced labourers.

In 1945, two sea mines exploded, destroying the outer defences. The wall has been restored in its original form with battlements.

== Preservation ==
Mahon is now the only preserved coastal fort still standing between Cherbourg and the Belgian border. It was saved by geologist Jacques Mereau Destombes. After recognizing its historical importance, he recruited a team of volunteers in 1967. The Association des amis du fort d'Ambleteuse (Association of Friends of the Fort Ambleteuse) then bought the fort for a symbolic franc from the French government in the early 1970s.

Restoration has been carried out in three major projects. Firstly the ramparts were rebuilt with state assistance. Ancillary buildings were then restored with the help from the state, General Council of Pas-de-Calais, Crédit Agricole, and the Fondation du patrimoine (France's equivalent to the UK's National Trust) In 2010, all the buildings were re-roofed with funding from the government and several heritage organisations.

Fort Mahon Place in Bewdley, Worcestershire, is named after the Fort.

== Visiting ==
The fort is open to visitors every Sunday from April to November. There are two exhibition rooms with orientation plaques throughout the buildings. The viewing platform at the top of the tower has an interpretation board that explains the view across the Straits of Dover.
