= Marquise, Pas-de-Calais =

Marquise
- Commune
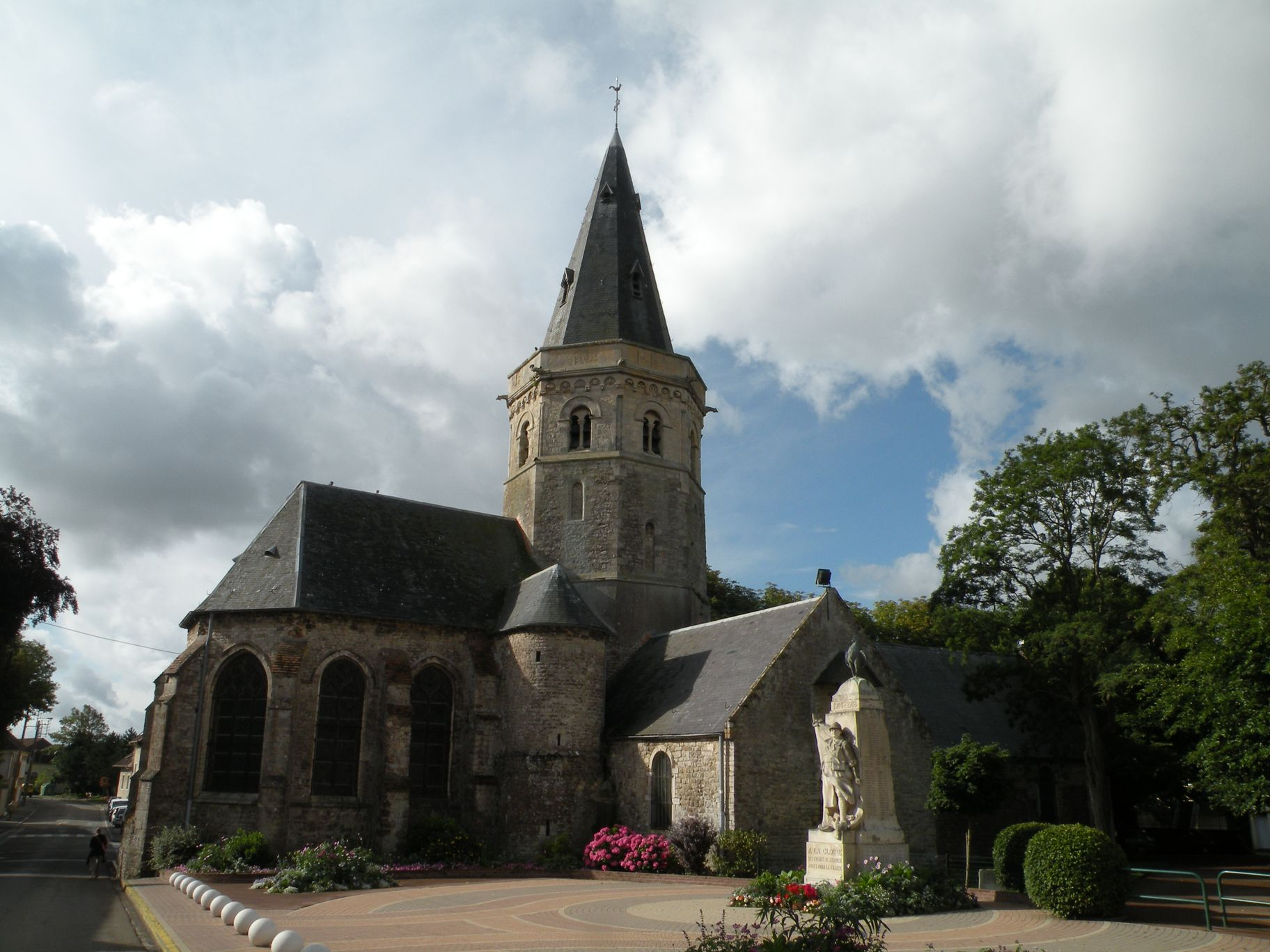
- The church of Marquise

- Coat of arms
- Location of Marquise
- Location within France Location within Hauts-de-France
- Coordinates: 50°48′55″N 1°42′15″E
- Country: France
- Region: Hauts-de-France
- Department: Pas-de-Calais
- Arrondissement: Boulogne-sur-Mer
- Canton: Desvres
- Intercommunality: CC Terre des Deux Caps

Government
  - Mayor (2024–2026): Olivier Leroy
- Area^{1}: 13.46 km^{2} (5.20 sq mi)
- Elevation: 39 m (128 ft)
- Highest elevation: 67 m (220 ft)
- Lowest elevation: 1 m (3.3 ft)
- Population (2023): 5,217
  - Density: 387.6/km^{2} (1,004/sq mi)
- Time zone: UTC+01:00 (CET)
  - Summer (DST): UTC+02:00 (CEST)
- INSEE/Postal code: 62560 /62250
- ^{1} French Land Register data, which excludes lakes, ponds, glaciers > 1 km^{2} (0.386 sq mi or 247 acres) and river estuaries.

Marquise (French pronunciation: [maʁkiz]) is a commune in the Pas-de-Calais department in the Hauts-de-France region of France about 10 miles (16 km) northeast of Boulogne. The river Slack flows through the commune.

== History ==
Part of the Flemish-speaking territory until 1346, Marquise became an English county under King Edward III after the battle of Crécy and the hexagonal bell-tower goes back to the English period. In 1420, in the suburbs of Marquise, at Leulinghen, the church of which was divided by the French-English border, King Henry V married Catherine of Valois, daughter of Charles VI of France.

Marquise received national media attention in autumn 2006 when the local police retrieved a painting by Maurice Boitel, stolen forty years before and taken out of France.

== Population ==
Historical population
Year	Pop.	±% p.a.
1968	4,991	—
1975	4,953	−0.11%
1982	4,731	−0.65%
1990	4,453	−0.75%
1999	4,580	+0.31%
2007	5,067	+1.27%
2012	5,141	+0.29%
2017	5,088	−0.21%
2023	5,217	+0.42%
Source: INSEE

== Notable people ==
- Alphonse Pinart, explorer, was born there in 1852.

== See also ==
- Communes of the Pas-de-Calais department
