= Slack (river) =

River in France

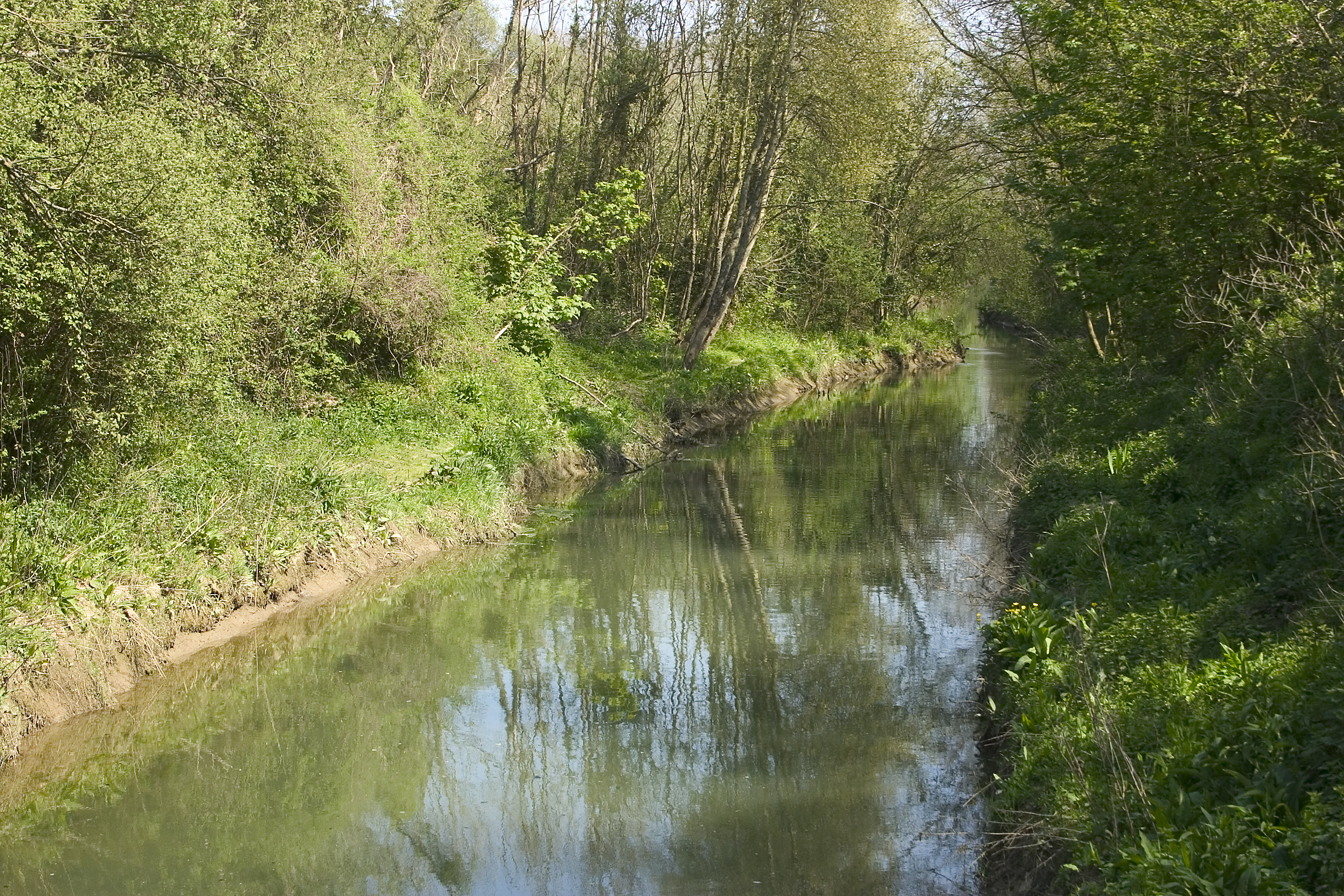
- The Slack

- Native name: La Slack (French)

Location
- Country: France

Physical characteristics
- Source
  - location: Pas-de-Calais
- Mouth
  - location: English Channel
  - coordinates: 50°48′18″N 1°36′5″E
- Length: 22 km (14 mi)

The Slack (French pronunciation: [slak], in Picard locally [s̟laːk]) is a 22-kilometre-long (14 mi) coastal river in the Pas-de-Calais department, in northern France.

It rises at Hermelinghen on Mount Binôt, flows through Rinxent, Marquise, Beuvrequen, Slack (village near Ambleteuse) and flows into the English Channel in Ambleteuse next to Fort Mahon.

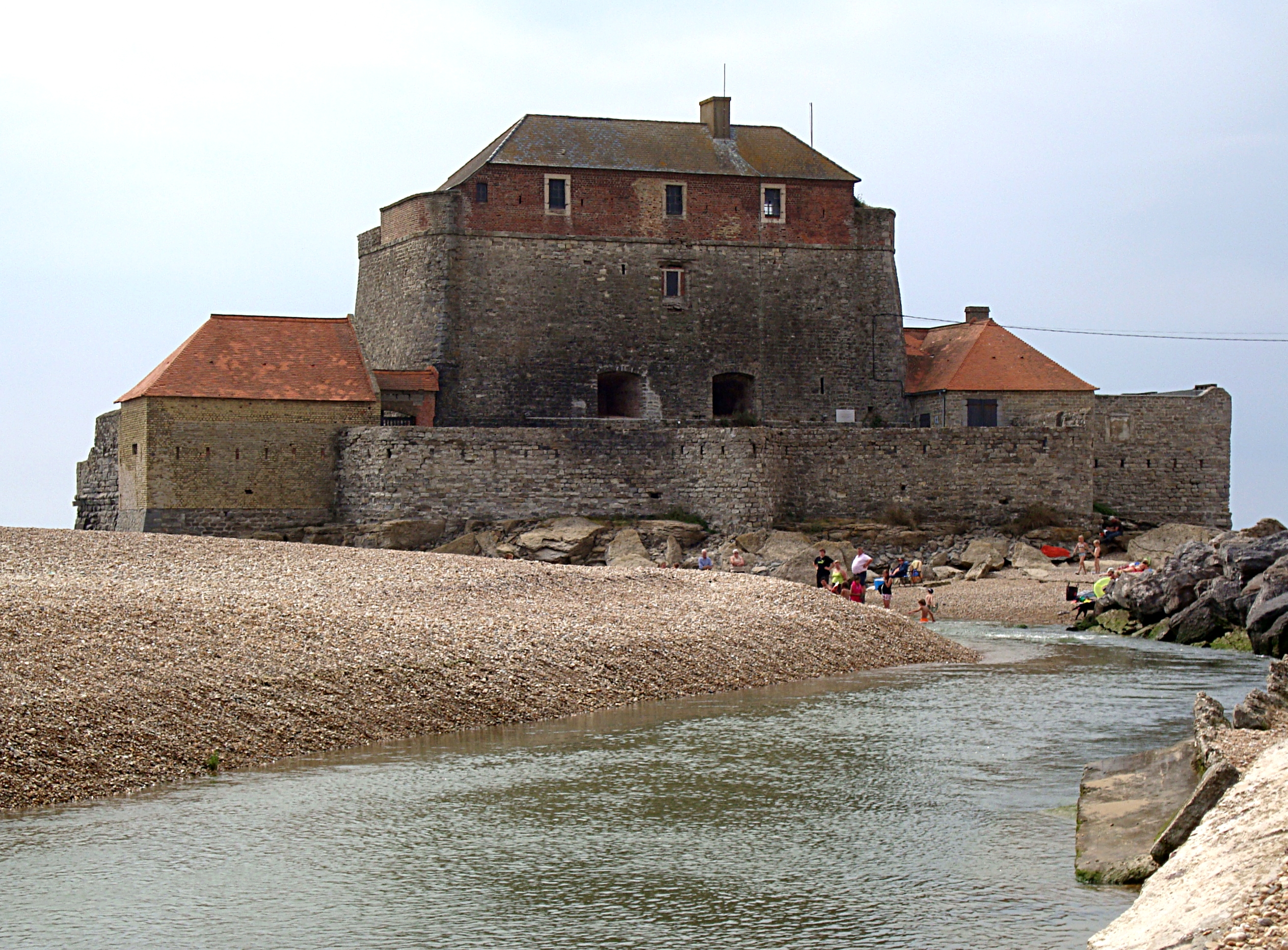
The Slack and Fort Mahon
