= Saint-Inglevert =

- Commune
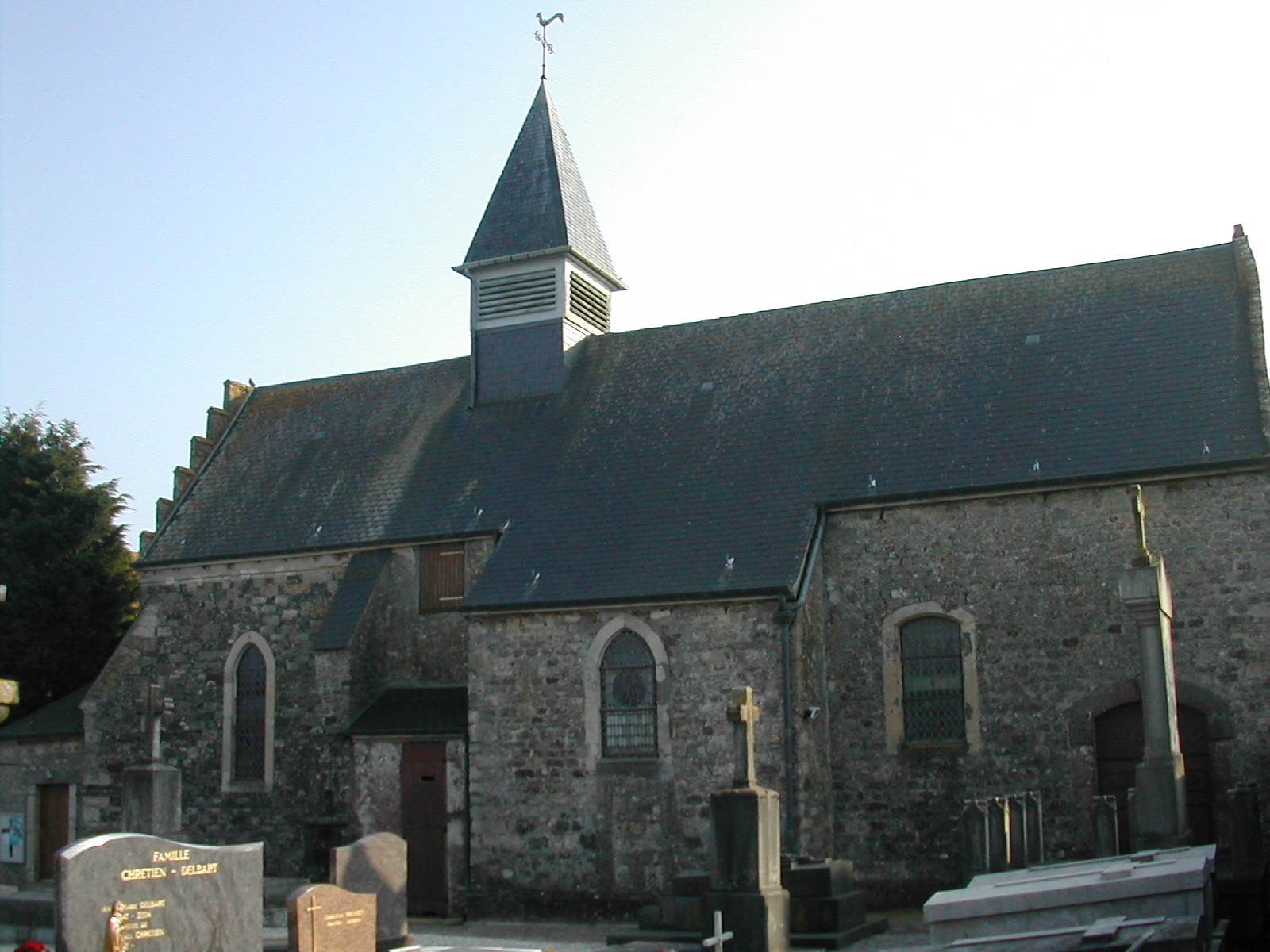
- The church of Saint-Inglevert

- Coat of arms
- Location of Saint-Inglevert
- Location within France Location within Hauts-de-France
- Coordinates: 50°52′33″N 1°44′37″E
- Country: France
- Region: Hauts-de-France
- Department: Pas-de-Calais
- Arrondissement: Boulogne-sur-Mer
- Canton: Desvres
- Intercommunality: CC Terre des Deux Caps

Government
  - Mayor (2020–2026): Francis Bouclet
- Area^{1}: 6.6 km^{2} (2.5 sq mi)
- Elevation: 123 m (404 ft)
- Highest elevation: 163 m (535 ft)
- Lowest elevation: 85 m (279 ft)
- Population (2023): 821
  - Density: 120/km^{2} (320/sq mi)
- Time zone: UTC+01:00 (CET)
  - Summer (DST): UTC+02:00 (CEST)
- INSEE/Postal code: 62751 /62250
- ^{1} French Land Register data, which excludes lakes, ponds, glaciers > 1 km^{2} (0.386 sq mi or 247 acres) and river estuaries.

Saint-Inglevert (French pronunciation: [sɛ̃.t‿ɛ̃ɡləvɛʁ]; West Flemish: Santingeveld) is a commune in the Pas-de-Calais department in the Hauts-de-France region of France.

== Topnymy ==
The etymology of Saint-Inglevert, first attested as Sontingeveld in 1140, is now generally agreed to derive from a Common Germanic anthroponym *Sondo, followed by -ingen "people of" (see nearby e.g. Tardinghen) + -veld "field". The name was no longer understood sometime in the late Early Middle Ages, leading to a popular re-interpretation of the first syllable, "sant-ingheveld". This led to a folk etymology of prefixed saint (as is very common in toponymy across France), thus shaping Saint Inglevert. Thus the meaning is, "the field of the people of Sondo".

Despite old local veneration, if there ever truly was a "Saint Inglevert" which perhaps influenced the name, the holy figure is unknown and lost to time.

== Geography ==
Saint-Inglevert is situated some 12 miles (19 km) north of Boulogne, at the junction of the D244 road with the A16 autoroute.

== Population ==
Historical population
Year	Pop.	±% p.a.
1968	433	—
1975	450	+0.55%
1982	420	−0.98%
1990	502	+2.25%
1999	539	+0.79%
2007	691	+3.15%
2012	733	+1.19%
2017	783	+1.33%
2023	821	+0.79%
Source: INSEE

== Places of interest ==
- The church of St. Barnabé dating from the sixteenth century.
- Traces of an old abbey-hospital.
- Saint-Inglevert Airfield

== See also ==
- Communes of the Pas-de-Calais department
