= Communauté de communes de la Terre des Deux Caps =

Federation of municipalities in France

Coordinates: 50.82°N 1.70°E

Terre des Deux Caps
- Communauté de communes
- Country: France
- Region: Hauts-de-France
- Department: Pas-de-Calais
- No. of communes: {{{nbcomm}}}
- Established: 2002

Government
  - President: Francis Bouclet
- Area: 183.3 km^{2} (70.8 sq mi)
- Population (2018): 22,197
  - Density: 121.1/km^{2} (313.6/sq mi)
- Website: www.terredes2caps.com

The communauté de communes de la Terre des Deux Caps is located in the Pas-de-Calais département, in northern France. It was established on 1 January 2002. Its seat is Marquise. Its area is 183.3 km^{2}, and its population was 22,197 in 2018.

== Composition ==
The communauté de communes consists of the following 21 communes:

1. Ambleteuse
2. Audembert
3. Audinghen
4. Audresselles
5. Bazinghen
6. Beuvrequen
7. Ferques
8. Hervelinghen
9. Landrethun-le-Nord
10. Leubringhen
11. Leulinghen-Bernes
12. Maninghen-Henne
13. Marquise
14. Offrethun
15. Rety
16. Rinxent
17. Saint-Inglevert
18. Tardinghen
19. Wacquinghen
20. Wierre-Effroy
21. Wissant
