= Rety =

Rety Reetseke
- Commune
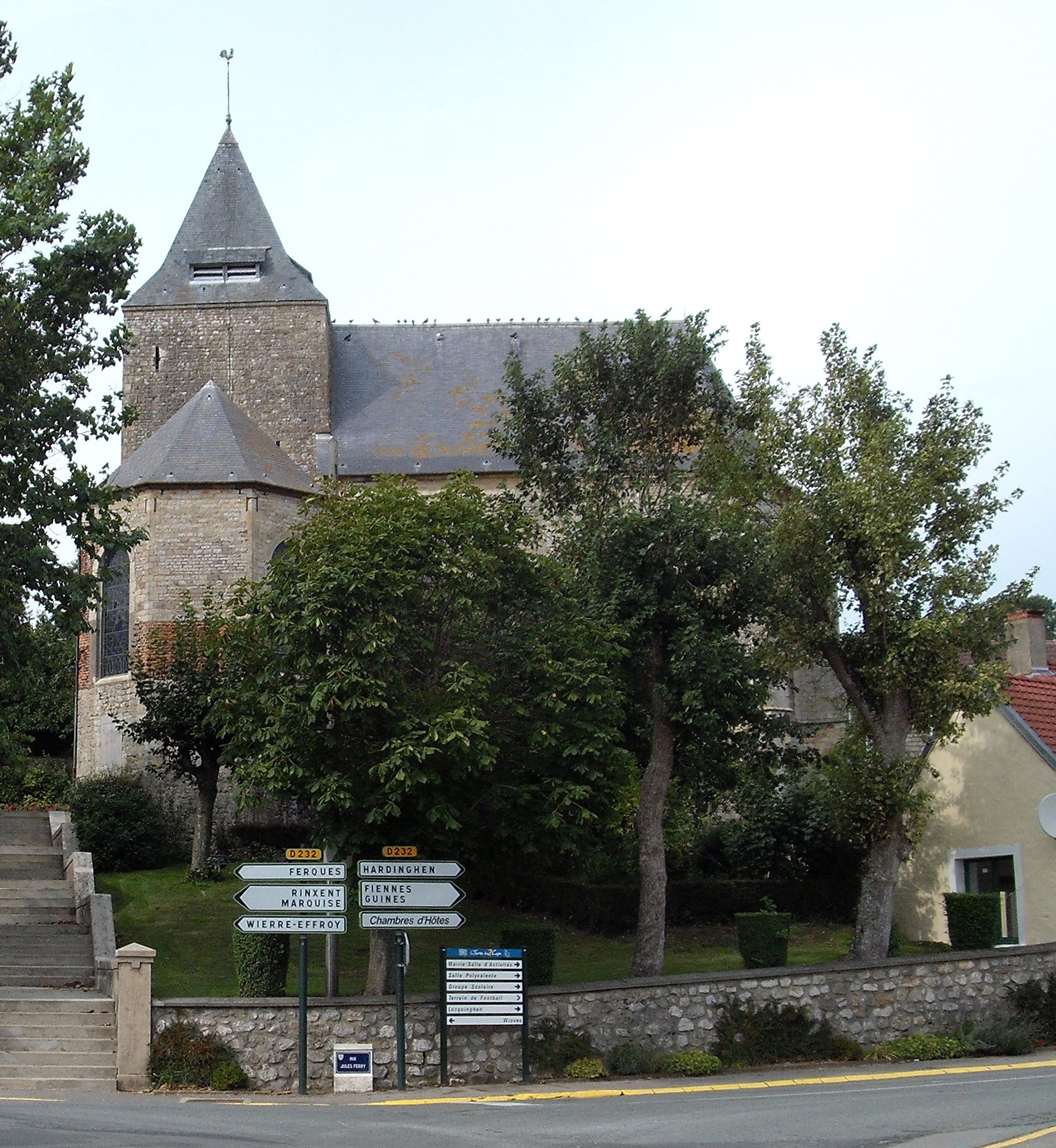
- The church of Rety

- Coat of arms
- Location of Rety
- Location within France Location within Hauts-de-France
- Coordinates: 50°47′53″N 1°46′32″E
- Country: France
- Region: Hauts-de-France
- Department: Pas-de-Calais
- Arrondissement: Boulogne-sur-Mer
- Canton: Desvres
- Intercommunality: Terre des Deux Caps

Government
  - Mayor (2020–2026): Patrick Bernard
- Area^{1}: 18.25 km^{2} (7.05 sq mi)
- Elevation: 64 m (210 ft)
- Highest elevation: 120 m (390 ft)
- Lowest elevation: 12 m (39 ft)
- Population (2023): 2,032
  - Density: 111.3/km^{2} (288.4/sq mi)
- Time zone: UTC+01:00 (CET)
  - Summer (DST): UTC+02:00 (CEST)
- INSEE/Postal code: 62705 /62720
- ^{1} French Land Register data, which excludes lakes, ponds, glaciers > 1 km^{2} (0.386 sq mi or 247 acres) and river estuaries.

Rety (French pronunciation: [ʁeti]; West Flemish: Reetseke) is a commune in the Pas-de-Calais department in the Hauts-de-France region of France about 9 miles (14 km) northeast of Boulogne, by the banks of the river Slack.

== Population ==
Historical population
Year	Pop.	±% p.a.
1968	1,633	—
1975	1,617	−0.14%
1982	1,707	+0.78%
1990	1,809	+0.73%
1999	1,924	+0.69%
2007	1,917	−0.05%
2012	2,082	+1.67%
2017	2,096	+0.13%
2023	2,032	−0.52%
Source: INSEE

== See also ==
- Communes of the Pas-de-Calais department
