= Beuvrequen =

Beuvrequen Beuverken
- Commune
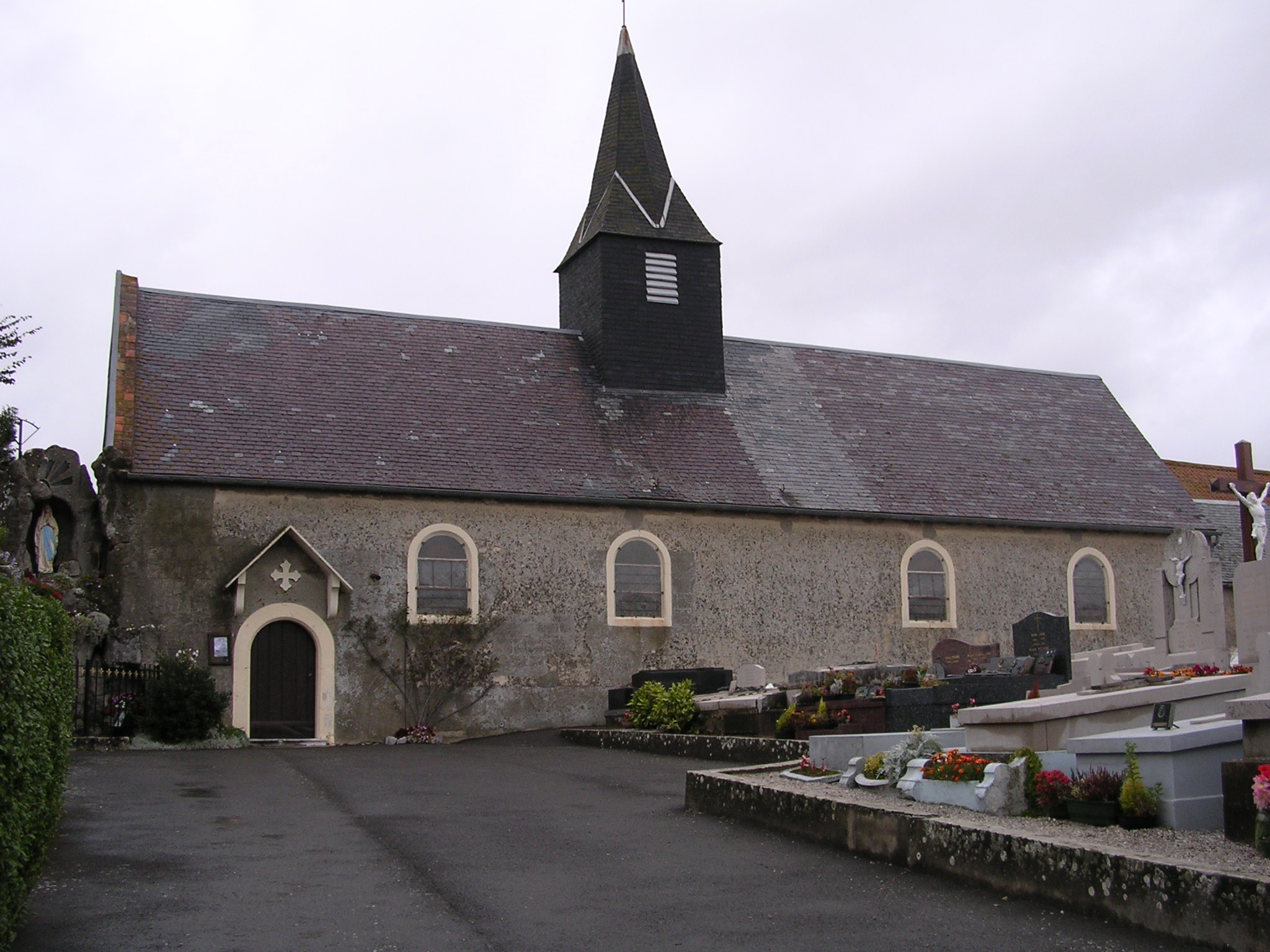
- The church of Beuvrequen

- Coat of arms
- Location of Beuvrequen
- Location within France Location within Hauts-de-France
- Coordinates: 50°48′11″N 1°40′00″E
- Country: France
- Region: Hauts-de-France
- Department: Pas-de-Calais
- Arrondissement: Boulogne-sur-Mer
- Canton: Desvres
- Intercommunality: CC Terre des Deux Caps

Government
  - Mayor (2020–2026): Alain Barré
- Area^{1}: 4.75 km^{2} (1.83 sq mi)
- Elevation: 57 m (187 ft)
- Highest elevation: 93 m (305 ft)
- Lowest elevation: 3 m (9.8 ft)
- Population (2023): 458
  - Density: 96.4/km^{2} (250/sq mi)
- Time zone: UTC+01:00 (CET)
  - Summer (DST): UTC+02:00 (CEST)
- INSEE/Postal code: 62125 /62250
- ^{1} French Land Register data, which excludes lakes, ponds, glaciers > 1 km^{2} (0.386 sq mi or 247 acres) and river estuaries.

Beuvrequen (French pronunciation: [bœvʁəkɑ̃]; Picard: Beuverguin; West Flemish: Beuverken) is a commune in the Pas-de-Calais department in the Hauts-de-France region in northern France.

== Geography ==
A farming commune, some 6 miles (9.7 km) northeast of Boulogne, at the junction of the D241 and the D241e roads, by the banks of the river Slack. The A16 autoroute passes through the commune, forming its southeastern border.

== Population ==
Historical population
Year	Pop.	±% p.a.
1968	237	—
1975	313	+4.05%
1982	306	−0.32%
1990	322	+0.64%
1999	392	+2.21%
2007	414	+0.68%
2012	385	−1.44%
2017	457	+3.49%
2023	458	+0.04%
Source: INSEE

== Sights ==
- The windmill de René.
- The church of St. Maxime, dating from the sixteenth century.

== See also ==
- Communes of the Pas-de-Calais department
