= Audembert =

Audembert Hondsberg
- Commune
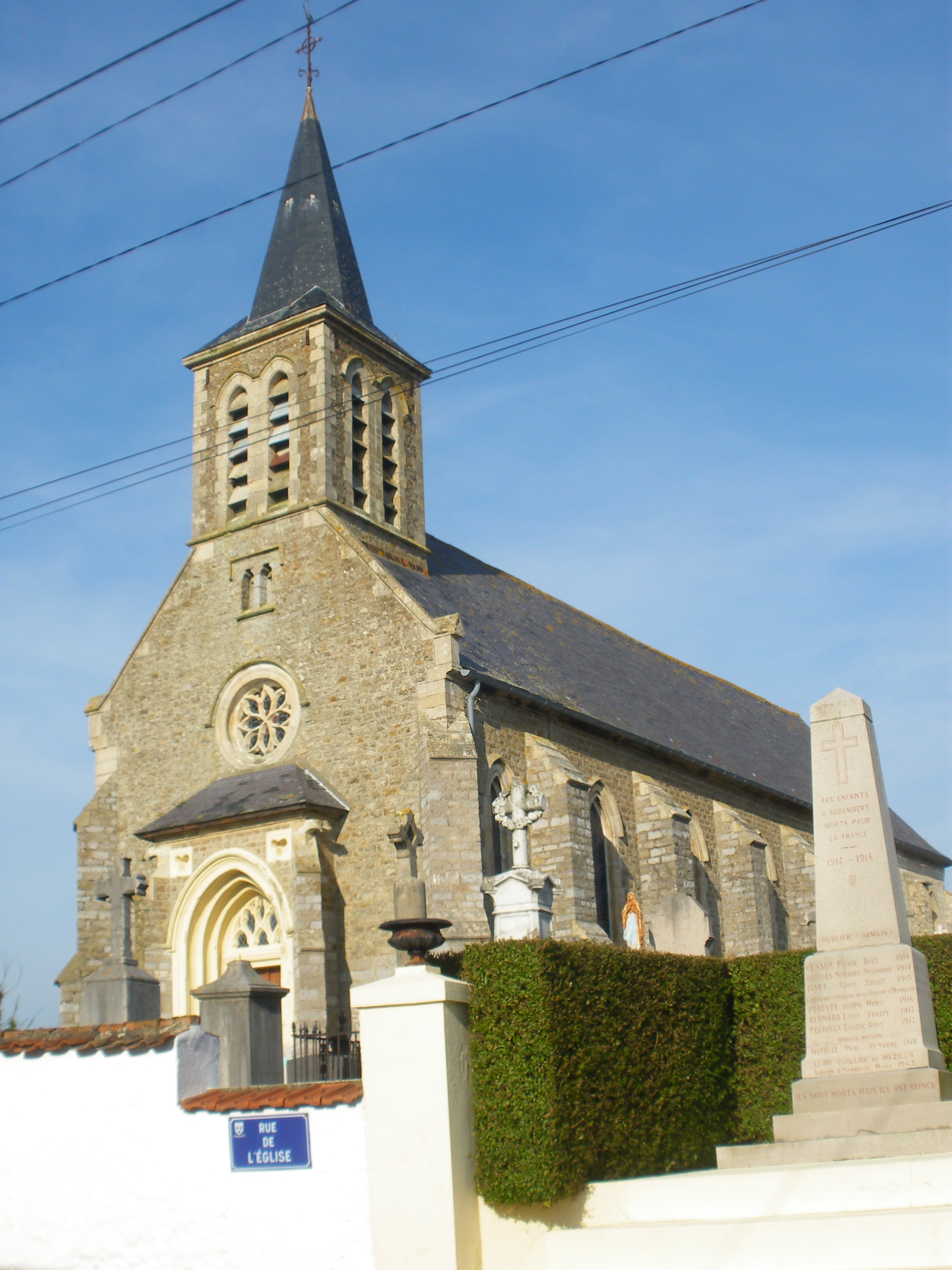
- The church of Audembert

- Coat of arms
- Location of Audembert
- Location within France Location within Hauts-de-France
- Coordinates: 50°51′42″N 1°41′36″E
- Country: France
- Region: Hauts-de-France
- Department: Pas-de-Calais
- Arrondissement: Boulogne-sur-Mer
- Canton: Desvres
- Intercommunality: Terre des Deux Caps

Government
  - Mayor (2020–2026): Patricia Admont
- Area^{1}: 7.5 km^{2} (2.9 sq mi)
- Elevation: 50 m (160 ft)
- Highest elevation: 162 m (531 ft)
- Lowest elevation: 13 m (43 ft)
- Population (2023): 424
  - Density: 57/km^{2} (150/sq mi)
- Time zone: UTC+01:00 (CET)
  - Summer (DST): UTC+02:00 (CEST)
- INSEE/Postal code: 62052 /62250
- ^{1} French Land Register data, which excludes lakes, ponds, glaciers > 1 km^{2} (0.386 sq mi or 247 acres) and river estuaries.

Audembert (French pronunciation: [odɑ̃bɛʁ]; West Flemish: Hondsberg) is a commune in the Pas-de-Calais department in the Hauts-de-France region in northern France.

== Geography ==
A small farming commune, some 14 miles (23 km) north of Boulogne, at the junction of the D238 and the D249 roads.

== Population ==
Historical population
Year	Pop.	±% p.a.
1968	277	—
1975	256	−1.12%
1982	259	+0.17%
1990	283	+1.11%
1999	357	+2.61%
2007	398	+1.37%
2012	397	−0.05%
2017	432	+1.70%
2023	424	−0.31%
Source: INSEE

== Sights ==
- The church of St. Martin, dating from the nineteenth century.
- The eighteenth-century Château de Warcove.
- Two 17th-century manor houses at Noirbernes and Warcove.

== See also ==
- Communes of the Pas-de-Calais department
