= Rouen Airport =

Coordinates: 49°23′27″N 001°11′02″E

Rouen Airport Aéroport de Rouen - Vallée de Seine
- IATA: URO; ICAO: LFOP

Summary
- Airport type: Public
- Serves: Rouen, France
- Location: Boos, France
- Elevation AMSL: 512 ft / 156 m
- Website: www.rouen.aeroport.fr
- Interactive map of Rouen Airport

Runways
Direction	Length		Surface
Direction	m	ft	Surface
04/22	1,700	5,577	Asphalt
- Source: French AIP

Rouen Airport or Aéroport de Rouen - Vallée de Seine (IATA: URO, ICAO: LFOP) is an airport located in Boos and 10 km southeast of Rouen, both communes of the Seine-Maritime département in the Normandy région of France.

== Airlines and destinations ==
As of April 2021, there are no scheduled flights to/from Rouen Airport. Previously, Air France Hop operated summer seasonal flights to Bastia since 2017 and Figari since 2019, which were cancelled in early 2021.

== Statistics ==
In 2017, some 4150 passengers were handled by HOP! to Bastia and Lyon. In 2018, 17,615 passengers were carried from Rouen airport, an increase of 243% over 2017.
