= Leubringhen =

- Commune
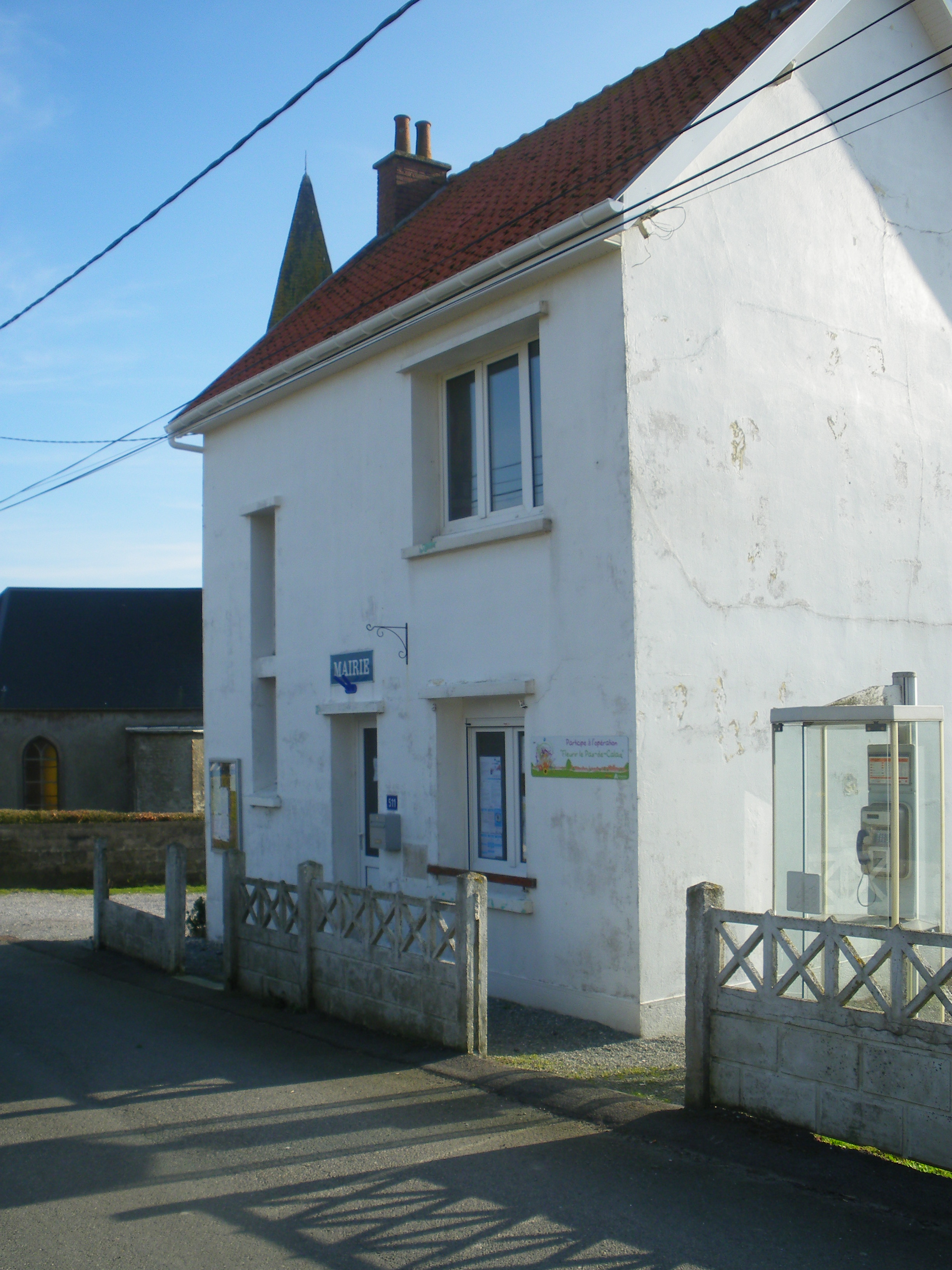
- The town hall of Leubringhen

- Coat of arms
- Location of Leubringhen
- Location within France Location within Hauts-de-France
- Coordinates: 50°51′30″N 1°43′20″E
- Country: France
- Region: Hauts-de-France
- Department: Pas-de-Calais
- Arrondissement: Boulogne-sur-Mer
- Canton: Desvres
- Intercommunality: CC Terre des Deux Caps

Government
  - Mayor (2020–2026): Hervé Dezombre
- Area^{1}: 7.98 km^{2} (3.08 sq mi)
- Elevation: 96 m (315 ft)
- Highest elevation: 163 m (535 ft)
- Lowest elevation: 48 m (157 ft)
- Population (2023): 293
  - Density: 36.7/km^{2} (95.1/sq mi)
- Time zone: UTC+01:00 (CET)
  - Summer (DST): UTC+02:00 (CEST)
- INSEE/Postal code: 62503 /62250
- ^{1} French Land Register data, which excludes lakes, ponds, glaciers > 1 km^{2} (0.386 sq mi or 247 acres) and river estuaries.

Leubringhen (French pronunciation: [lœbʁɛ̃ɡɑ̃]) is a commune in the Pas-de-Calais department in the Hauts-de-France region of France. about 11 miles (18 km) northeast of Boulogne.

== Population ==
Historical population
Year	Pop.	±% p.a.
1968	201	—
1975	196	−0.36%
1982	192	−0.29%
1990	207	+0.94%
1999	257	+2.43%
2007	315	+2.58%
2012	301	−0.91%
2017	295	−0.40%
2023	293	−0.11%
Source: INSEE

== See also ==
- Communes of the Pas-de-Calais department
