= Wierre-Effroy =

- Commune
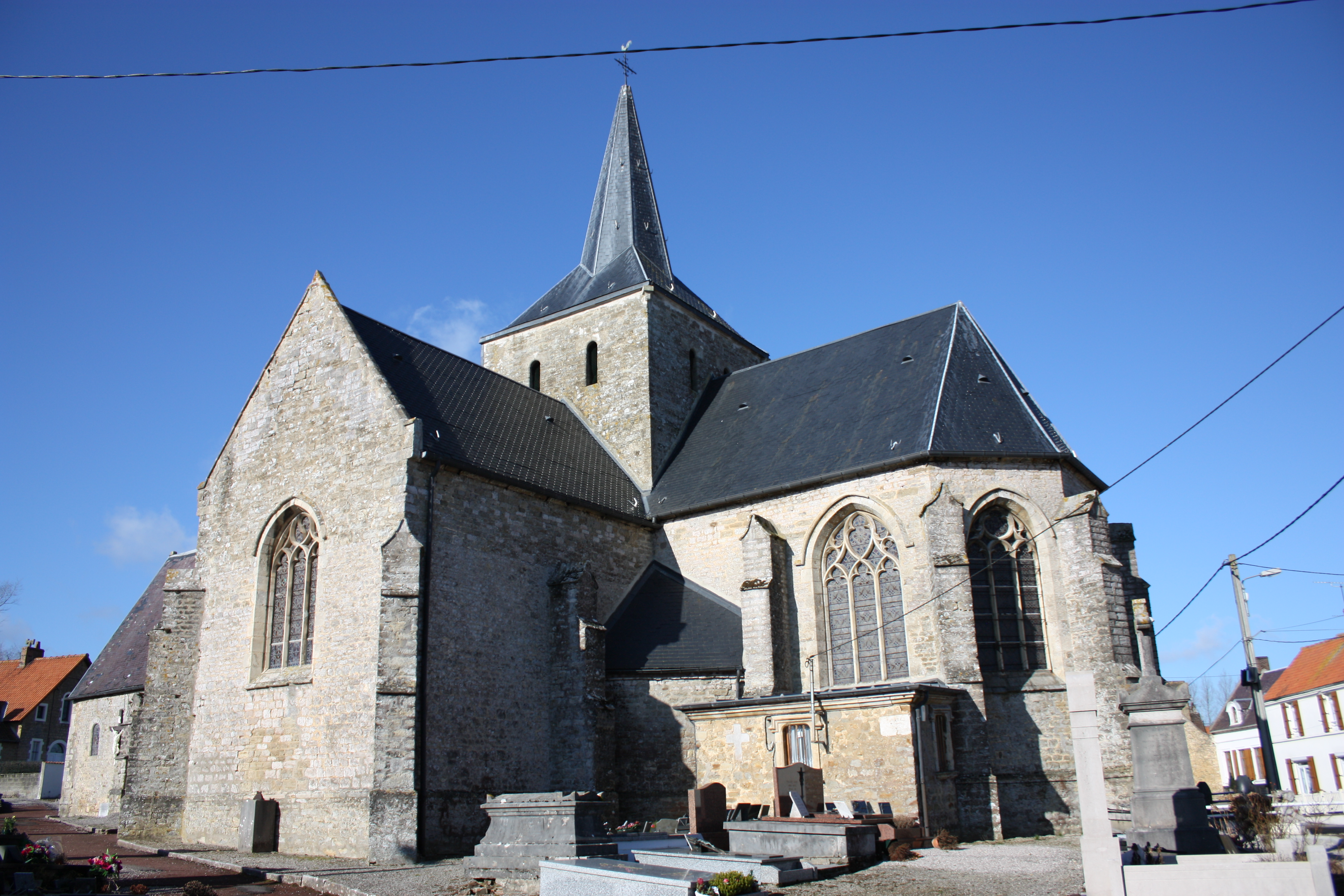
- The church of Wierre-Effroy
- Location of Wierre-Effroy
- Location within France Location within Hauts-de-France
- Coordinates: 50°46′44″N 1°44′21″E
- Country: France
- Region: Hauts-de-France
- Department: Pas-de-Calais
- Arrondissement: Boulogne-sur-Mer
- Canton: Desvres
- Intercommunality: Terre des Deux Caps

Government
  - Mayor (2020–2026): Jean-Pierre Louvet
- Area^{1}: 18.91 km^{2} (7.30 sq mi)
- Elevation: 136 m (446 ft)
- Highest elevation: 96 m (315 ft)
- Lowest elevation: 14 m (46 ft)
- Population (2023): 834
  - Density: 44.1/km^{2} (114/sq mi)
- Time zone: UTC+01:00 (CET)
  - Summer (DST): UTC+02:00 (CEST)
- INSEE/Postal code: 62889 /62720
- ^{1} French Land Register data, which excludes lakes, ponds, glaciers > 1 km^{2} (0.386 sq mi or 247 acres) and river estuaries.

Wierre-Effroy (French pronunciation: [wjɛʁ efʁwa]) is a commune in the Pas-de-Calais department in the Hauts-de-France region of France about 8 miles (13 km) northeast of Boulogne.

== Population ==
Historical population
Year	Pop.	±% p.a.
1968	664	—
1975	569	−2.18%
1982	619	+1.21%
1990	707	+1.68%
1999	747	+0.61%
2007	782	+0.57%
2012	775	−0.18%
2017	857	+2.03%
2023	834	−0.45%
Source: INSEE

== See also ==
- Communes of the Pas-de-Calais department
