= Hervelinghen =

Hervelinghen Helvetingen
- Commune
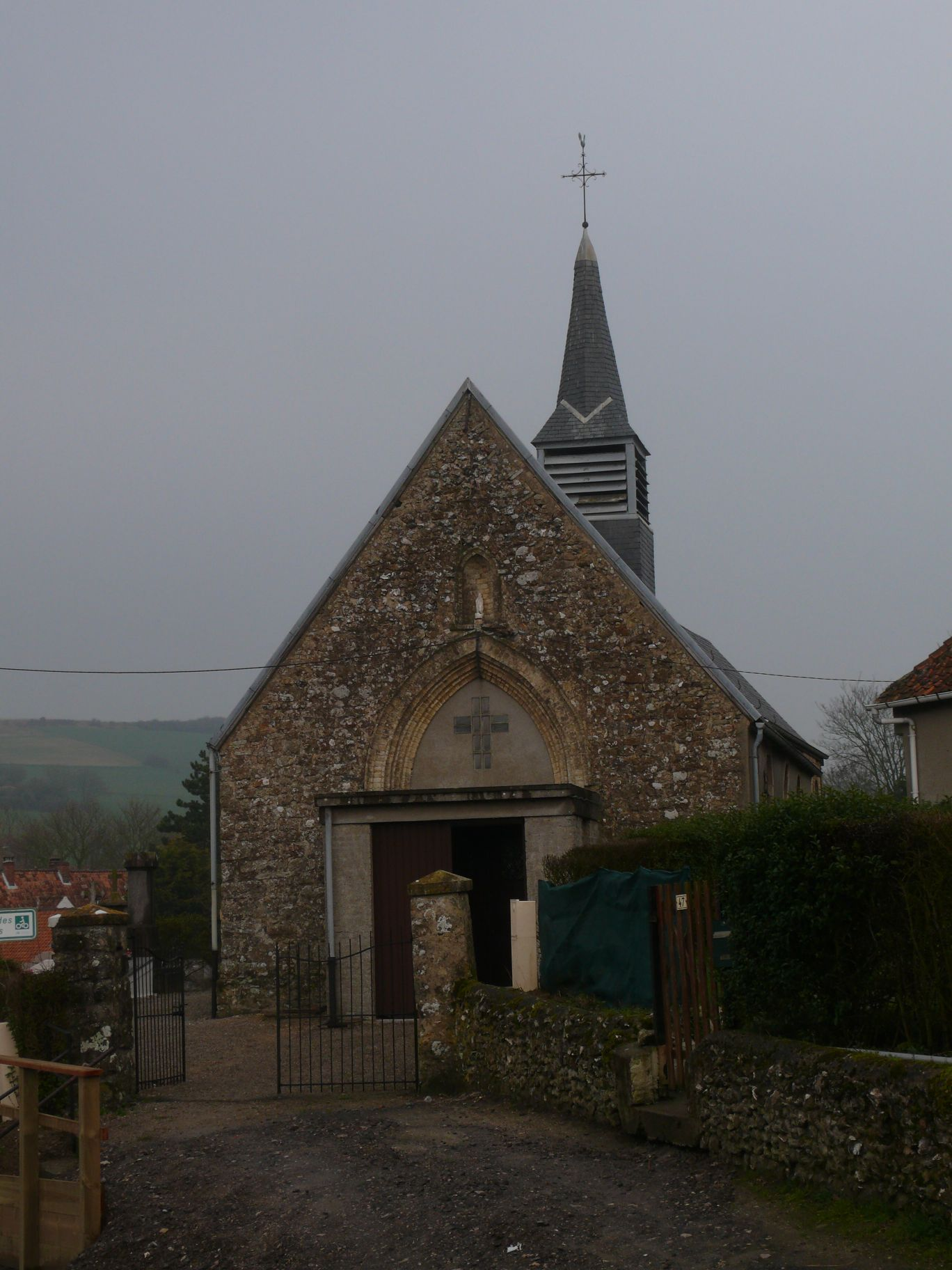
- The church of Hervelinghen

- Coat of arms
- Location of Hervelinghen
- Location within France Location within Hauts-de-France
- Coordinates: 50°52′57″N 1°42′46″E
- Country: France
- Region: Hauts-de-France
- Department: Pas-de-Calais
- Arrondissement: Boulogne-sur-Mer
- Canton: Desvres
- Intercommunality: CC Terre des Deux Caps

Government
  - Mayor (2020–2026): Pierre Ammeux
- Area^{1}: 5.89 km^{2} (2.27 sq mi)
- Elevation: 52 m (171 ft)
- Highest elevation: 157 m (515 ft)
- Lowest elevation: 39 m (128 ft)
- Population (2023): 215
  - Density: 36.5/km^{2} (94.5/sq mi)
- Time zone: UTC+01:00 (CET)
  - Summer (DST): UTC+02:00 (CEST)
- INSEE/Postal code: 62444 /62179
- ^{1} French Land Register data, which excludes lakes, ponds, glaciers > 1 km^{2} (0.386 sq mi or 247 acres) and river estuaries.

Hervelinghen (French pronunciation: [ɛʁvəlɛ̃ɡɑ̃]; West Flemish: Helvetingen) is a commune in the Pas-de-Calais department in the Hauts-de-France region of France about 13 miles (21 km) north of Boulogne. Hervelinghen is a part of the parish of Notre-Dame-des-Flots. Saint-Inglevert Airfield lies to the east of the village.

== Population ==
Historical population
Year	Pop.	±% p.a.
1968	149	—
1975	134	−1.50%
1982	166	+3.11%
1990	172	+0.44%
1999	182	+0.63%
2007	239	+3.46%
2012	233	−0.51%
2017	232	−0.09%
2023	215	−1.26%
Source: INSEE

== See also ==
- Communes of the Pas-de-Calais department
