= Offrethun =

- Commune
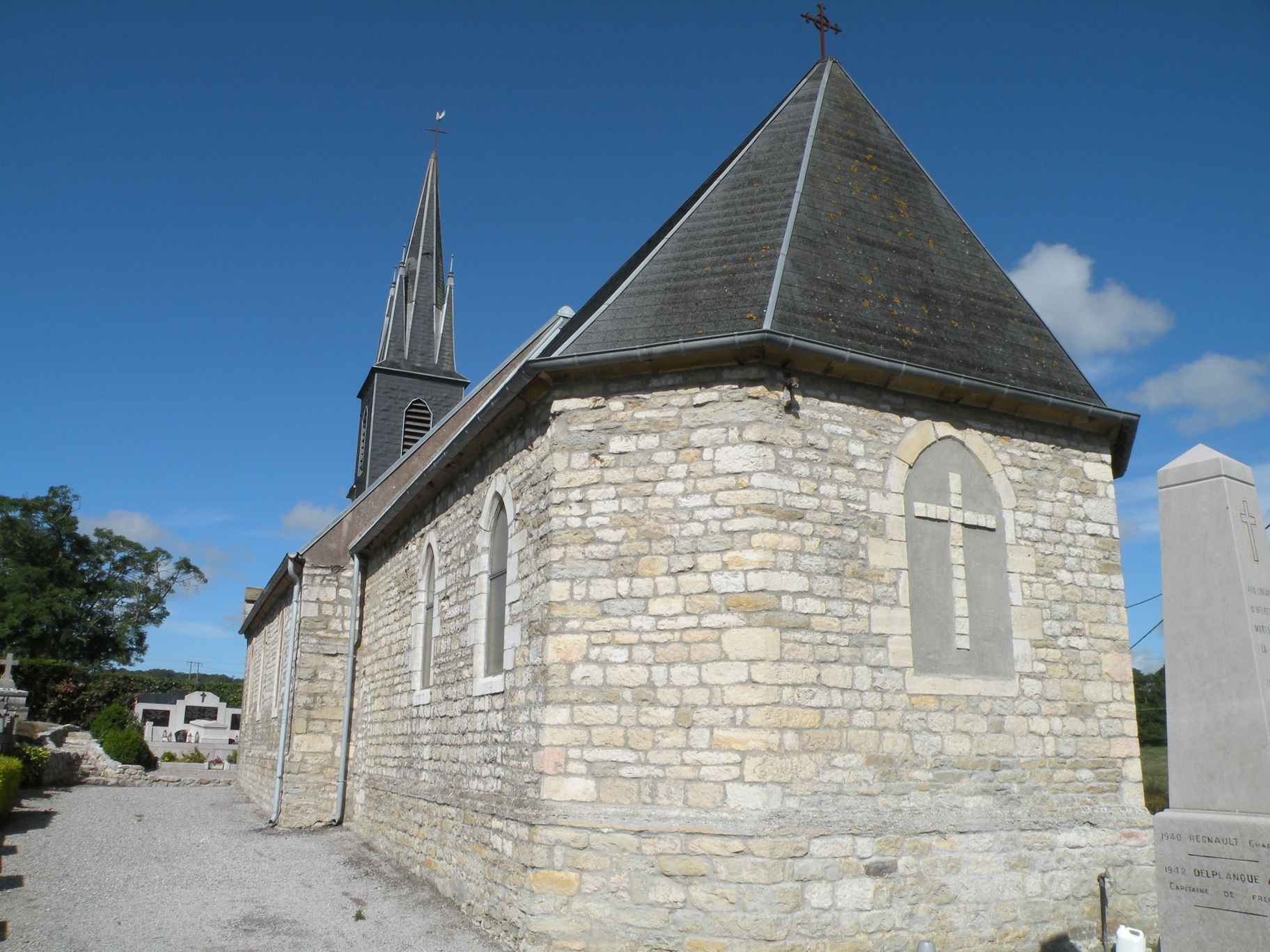
- The church of Offrethun

- Coat of arms
- Location of Offrethun
- Location within France Location within Hauts-de-France
- Coordinates: 50°47′05″N 1°41′33″E
- Country: France
- Region: Hauts-de-France
- Department: Pas-de-Calais
- Arrondissement: Boulogne-sur-Mer
- Canton: Desvres
- Intercommunality: CC Terre des Deux Caps

Government
  - Mayor (2020–2026): Philippe Emaille
- Area^{1}: 2.62 km^{2} (1.01 sq mi)
- Elevation: 55 m (180 ft)
- Highest elevation: 95 m (312 ft)
- Lowest elevation: 16 m (52 ft)
- Population (2023): 276
  - Density: 105/km^{2} (273/sq mi)
- Time zone: UTC+01:00 (CET)
  - Summer (DST): UTC+02:00 (CEST)
- INSEE/Postal code: 62636 /62250
- ^{1} French Land Register data, which excludes lakes, ponds, glaciers > 1 km^{2} (0.386 sq mi or 247 acres) and river estuaries.

Offrethun (French pronunciation: [ɔfʁətɛ̃]) is a commune in the Pas-de-Calais department in the Hauts-de-France region of France about 6 miles (9.7 km) northeast of Boulogne.

== Population ==
Historical population
Year	Pop.	±% p.a.
1968	117	—
1975	113	−0.50%
1982	168	+5.83%
1990	228	+3.89%
1999	275	+2.10%
2007	256	−0.89%
2012	271	+1.15%
2017	264	−0.52%
2023	276	+0.74%
Source: INSEE

== See also ==
- Communes of the Pas-de-Calais department
