= Tardinghen =

Tardinghen Terdingem (West Flemish)
- Commune
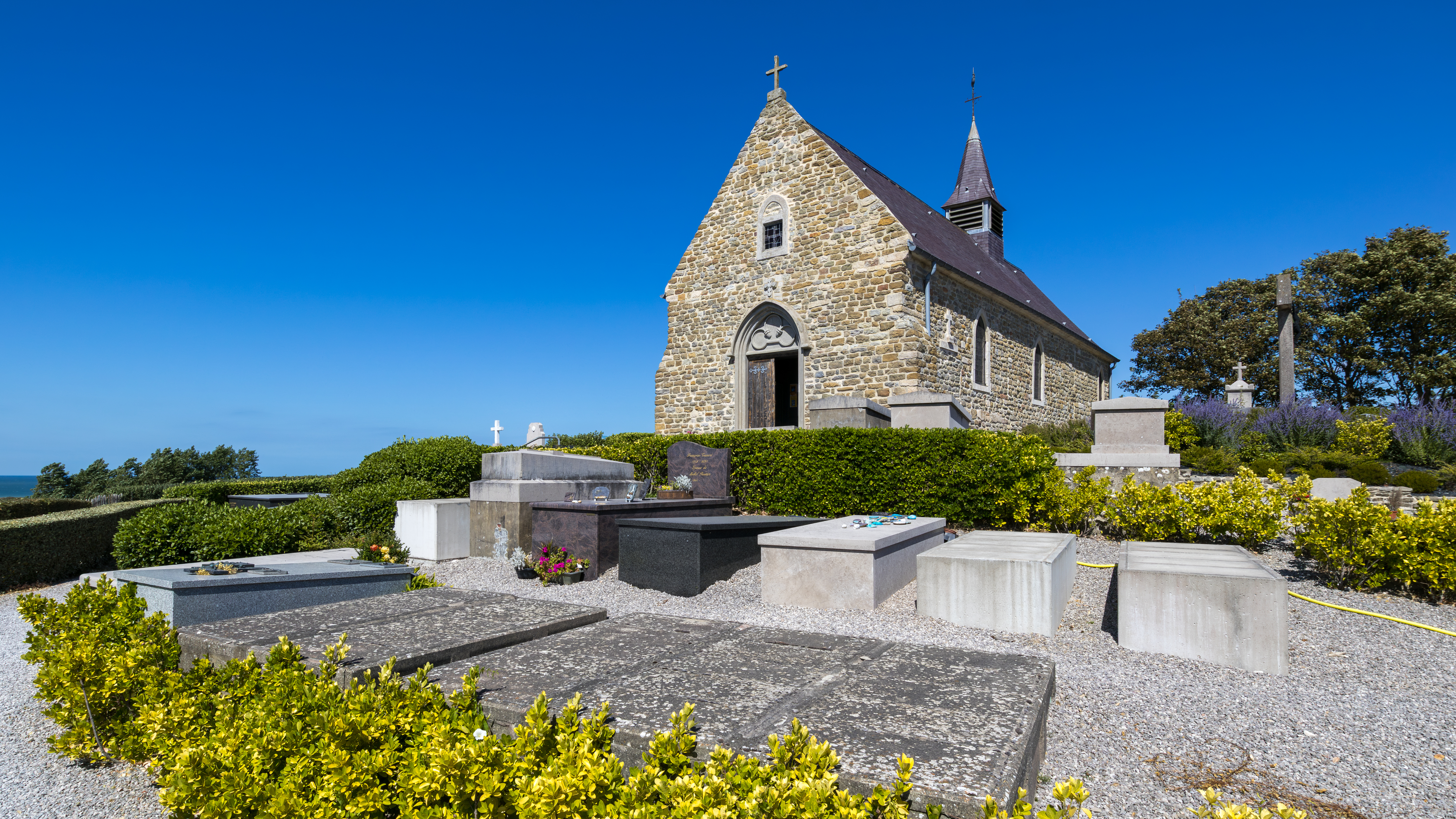
- The church of Tardinghen
- Location of Tardinghen
- Location within France Location within Hauts-de-France
- Coordinates: 50°52′01″N 1°37′52″E
- Country: France
- Region: Hauts-de-France
- Department: Pas-de-Calais
- Arrondissement: Boulogne-sur-Mer
- Canton: Desvres
- Intercommunality: CC Terre des Deux Caps

Government
  - Mayor (2020–2026): Thibaut Segard
- Area^{1}: 8.72 km^{2} (3.37 sq mi)
- Elevation: 50 m (160 ft)
- Highest elevation: 96 m (315 ft)
- Lowest elevation: 1 m (3.3 ft)
- Population (2023): 150
  - Density: 17/km^{2} (45/sq mi)
- Time zone: UTC+01:00 (CET)
  - Summer (DST): UTC+02:00 (CEST)
- INSEE/Postal code: 62806 /62179
- ^{1} French Land Register data, which excludes lakes, ponds, glaciers > 1 km^{2} (0.386 sq mi or 247 acres) and river estuaries.

Tardinghen (French: [taʁdɛ̃ɡɑ̃]; West Flemish: Terdingem [tærˈdɛŋəm]; Picard: Tardinghin [taʀdɪˈŋɛ̃]) is a commune in the Pas-de-Calais department in the Hauts-de-France region of France about 19 kilometres (12 mi) north of Boulogne, on Cape Gris-Nez.

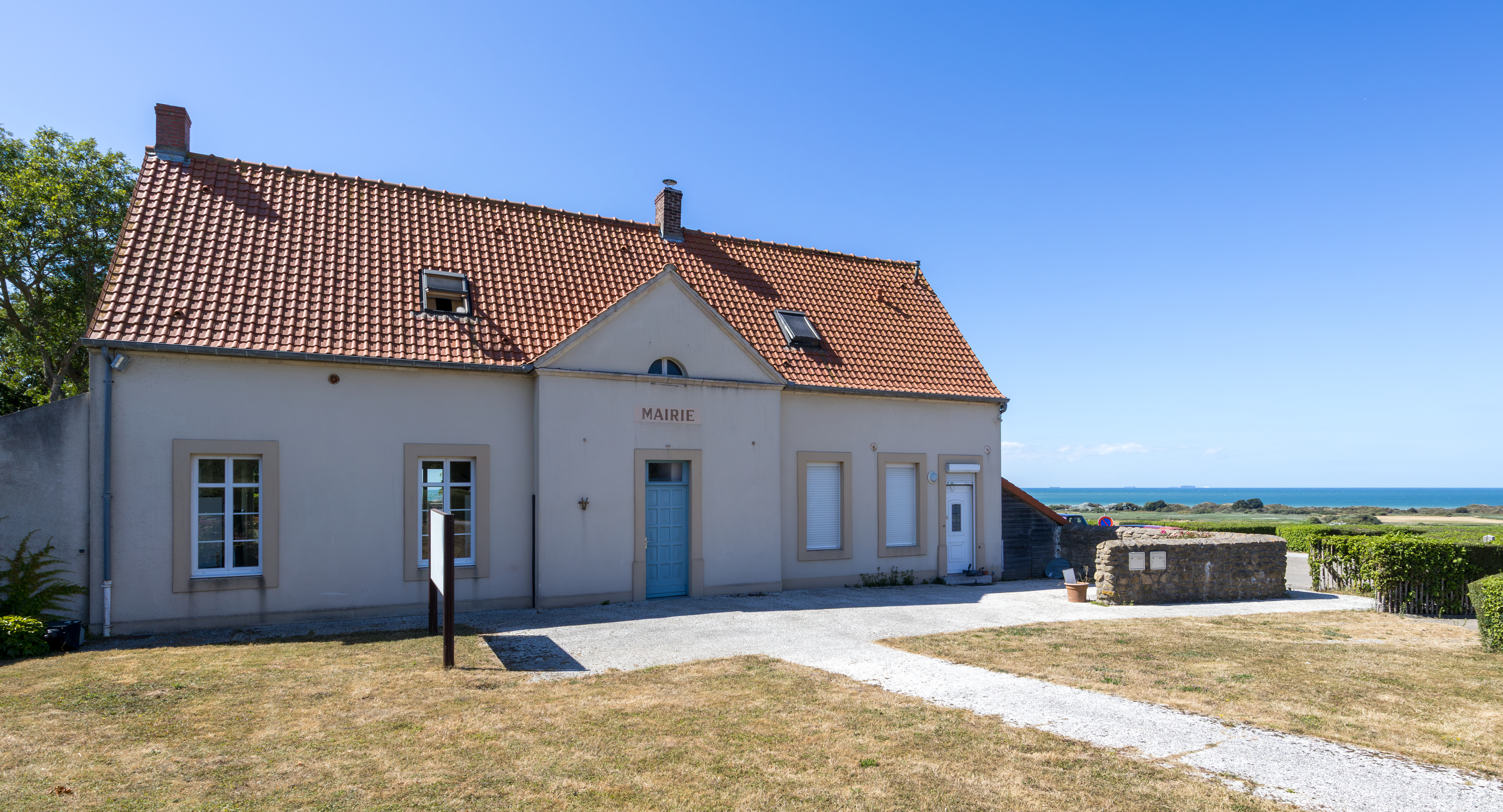
The town hall

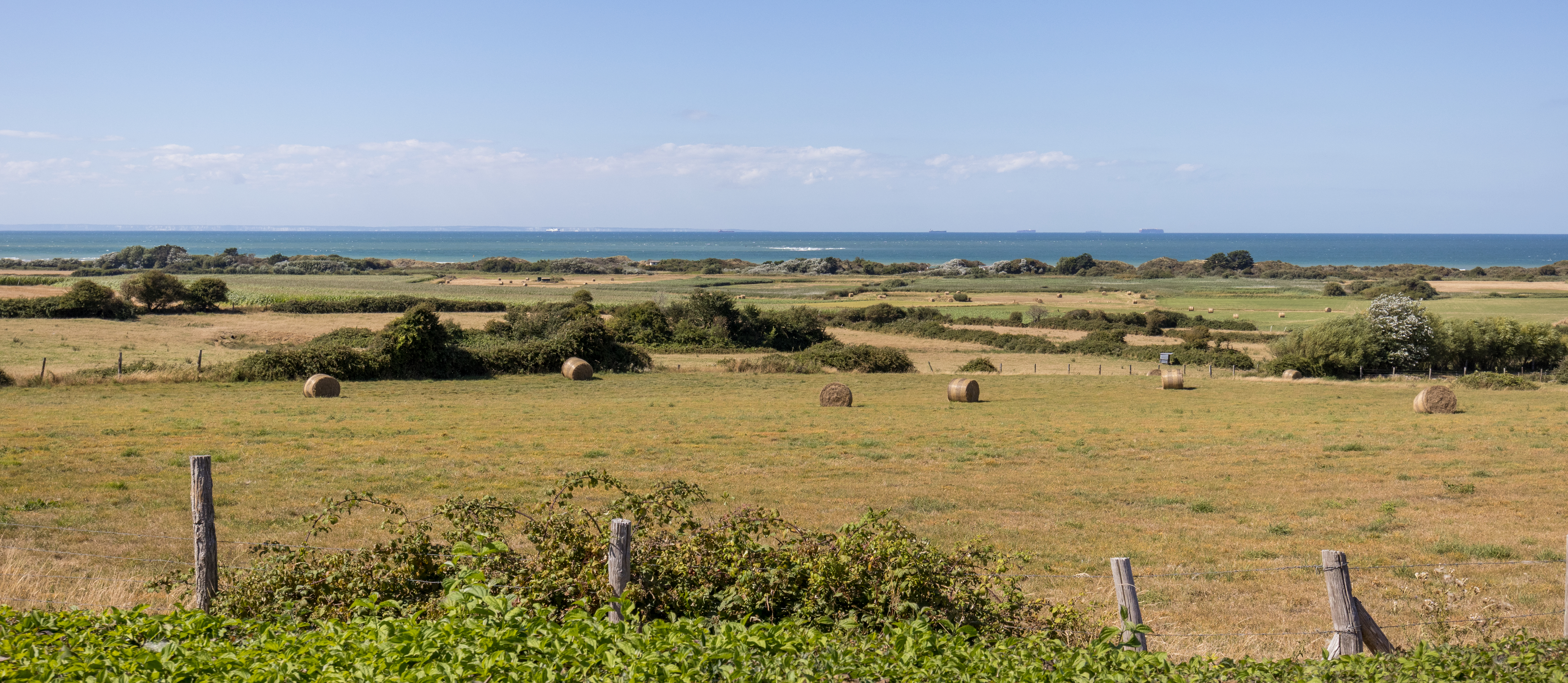
Uou can see the English coast in good weather.

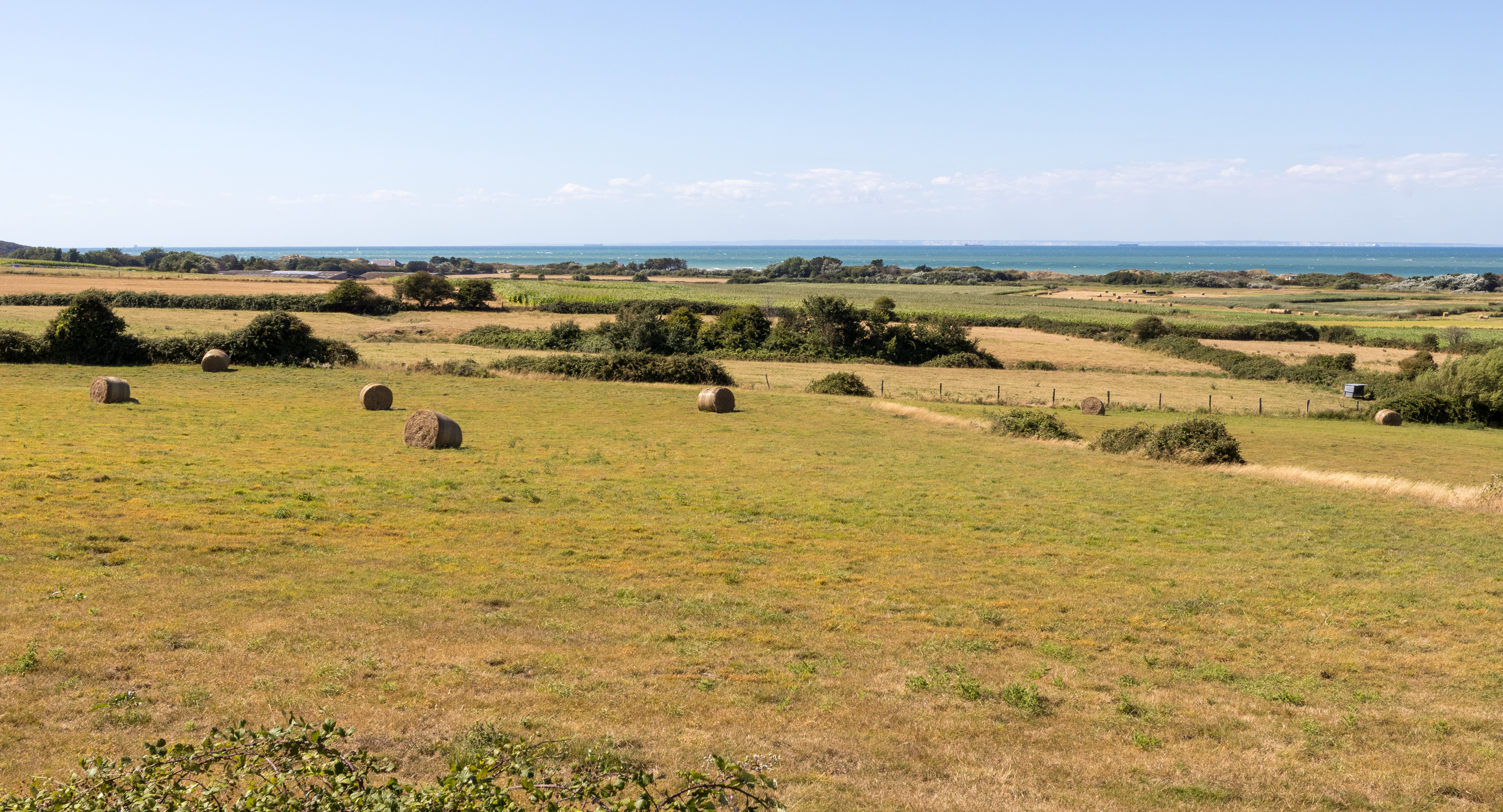

== Population ==
Historical population
Year	Pop.	±% p.a.
1968	145	—
1975	133	−1.23%
1982	127	−0.66%
1990	117	−1.02%
1999	127	+0.92%
2007	169	+3.64%
2012	147	−2.75%
2017	151	+0.54%
2023	150	−0.11%
Source: INSEE

== See also ==
- Communes of the Pas-de-Calais department
