= Ambleteuse =

Ambleteuse Ambeltuwe
- Commune
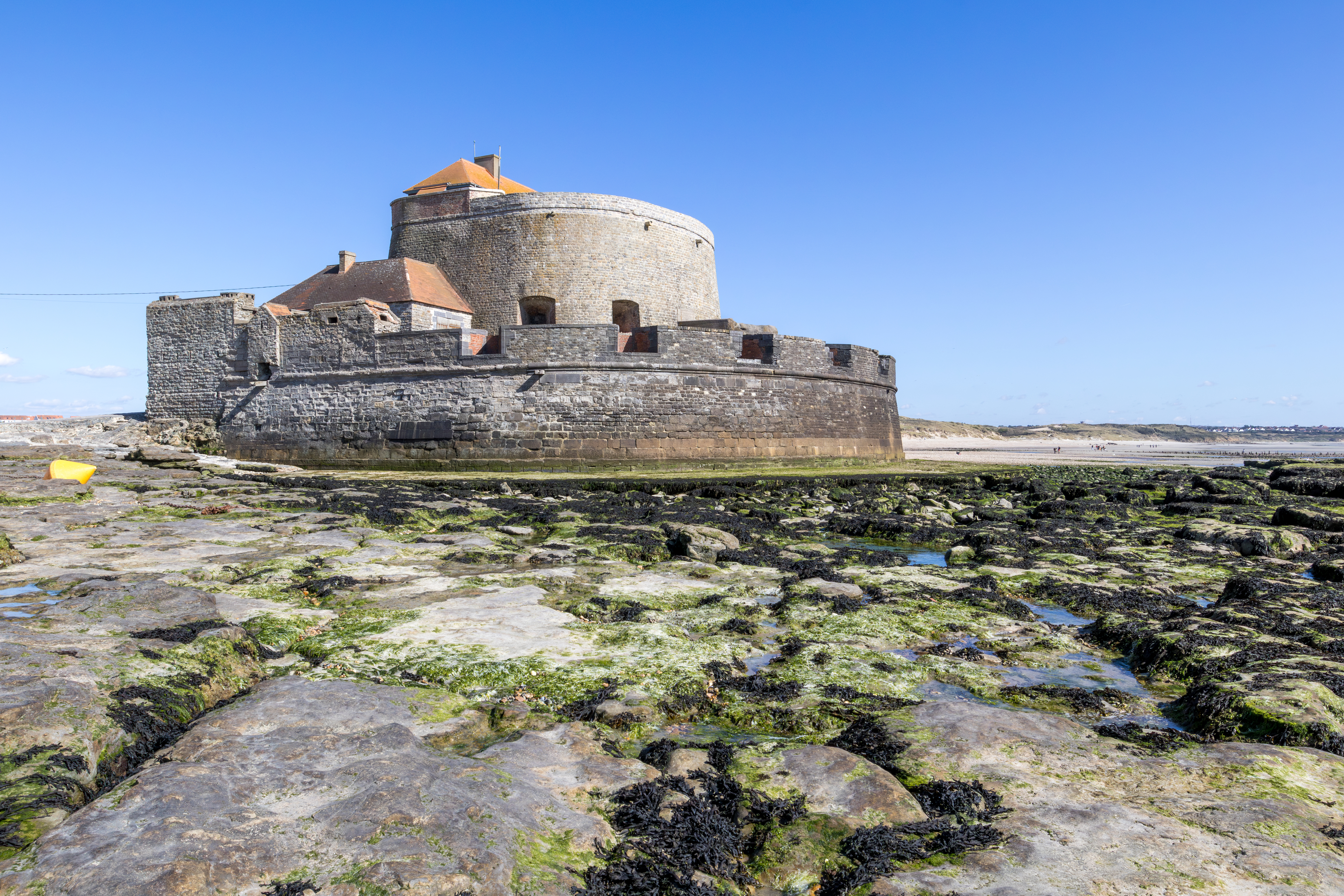
- Vauban's Fort Mahon in Ambleteuse
- Location of Ambleteuse
- Location within France Location within Hauts-de-France
- Coordinates: 50°48′37″N 1°36′26″E
- Country: France
- Region: Hauts-de-France
- Department: Pas-de-Calais
- Arrondissement: Boulogne-sur-Mer
- Canton: Desvres
- Intercommunality: Terre des Deux Caps

Government
  - Mayor (2021–2026): Stéphane Pinto
- Area^{1}: 5.45 km^{2} (2.10 sq mi)
- Elevation: 25 m (82 ft)
- Highest elevation: 77 m (253 ft)
- Lowest elevation: 0 m (0 ft)
- Population (2023): 2,033
  - Density: 373/km^{2} (966/sq mi)
- Time zone: UTC+01:00 (CET)
  - Summer (DST): UTC+02:00 (CEST)
- INSEE/Postal code: 62025 /62164
- ^{1} French Land Register data, which excludes lakes, ponds, glaciers > 1 km^{2} (0.386 sq mi or 247 acres) and river estuaries.

Ambleteuse (French pronunciation: [ɑ̃blətøz]; West Flemish: Ambeltuwe; Picard: Imbelteuse) is a commune in the Pas-de-Calais department in northern France.

== History ==
Ambleteuse began as a hamlet of a few huts in the middle of the dunes, from which the derisory name of “carcahuttes" (huts made from old-boat hulls) was once given to its inhabitants by their neighbors at Audresselles. The reason for its existence relates to the temporary needs of various invaders for conquering people from either side of the English Channel. Ambleteuse is one of the candidates for the harbour that Julius Caesar used to set out from for his invasion of Britain in 54 BC, though Boulogne-sur-Mer is the more usually accepted site.

The origin of the name of Ambleteuse remains uncertain. Some scholars claim it has Celtic origins (Ambleat), but that does not exclude the etymology "Hamel Thuys", a name given by the Saxons in the 6th century, as they too used the harbour when they emigrated to Great Britain.

Henry VIII of England had two forts built here in 1546 to maintain a show of power towards the French kings. Ambleteuse was chosen to provide an alternative harbour, and was called the 'Newhaven.' The other fort at nearby Cap Gris-Nez, was called the 'Blackness.' The forces of Henry II of France eventually conquered them in 1549. Henry, having killed all the English prisoners, then found a stock of coal in the fort. This was the first time that its use was noted on the continent.

At the end of the 17th century, Sébastien Vauban constructed Fort Mahon at the mouth of the river Slack. This is the only coastal fort from that era that has been preserved in France, thanks to restoration promoted by Dr. Méraut and the geologist Monsieur Destombe, who together created the "Association of the friends of Ambleteuse Fort" in 1960.

Napoleon modified the estuary of the Slack to create a harbour, from where he planned to invade England in (1805). The foundations of the harbour are still visible today.

At the end of the 19th century, Ambleteuse became a popular place for holidays for people from Lille and Paris. The middle classes had become interested in sea-bathing and hunting, shooting and fishing. Oyster-beds were built in the bay, to complete the ambiance of bourgeois life.

During World War II, the area fell under German military occupation. There was a concentration camp built in the environs. Between 1941 and 1943, the German engineers of Organisation Todt installed bunkers for artillery at the fort as part of work on the Atlantic Wall. In the bay of the river they also built sluices to flood the valley to prevent an Allied landing.

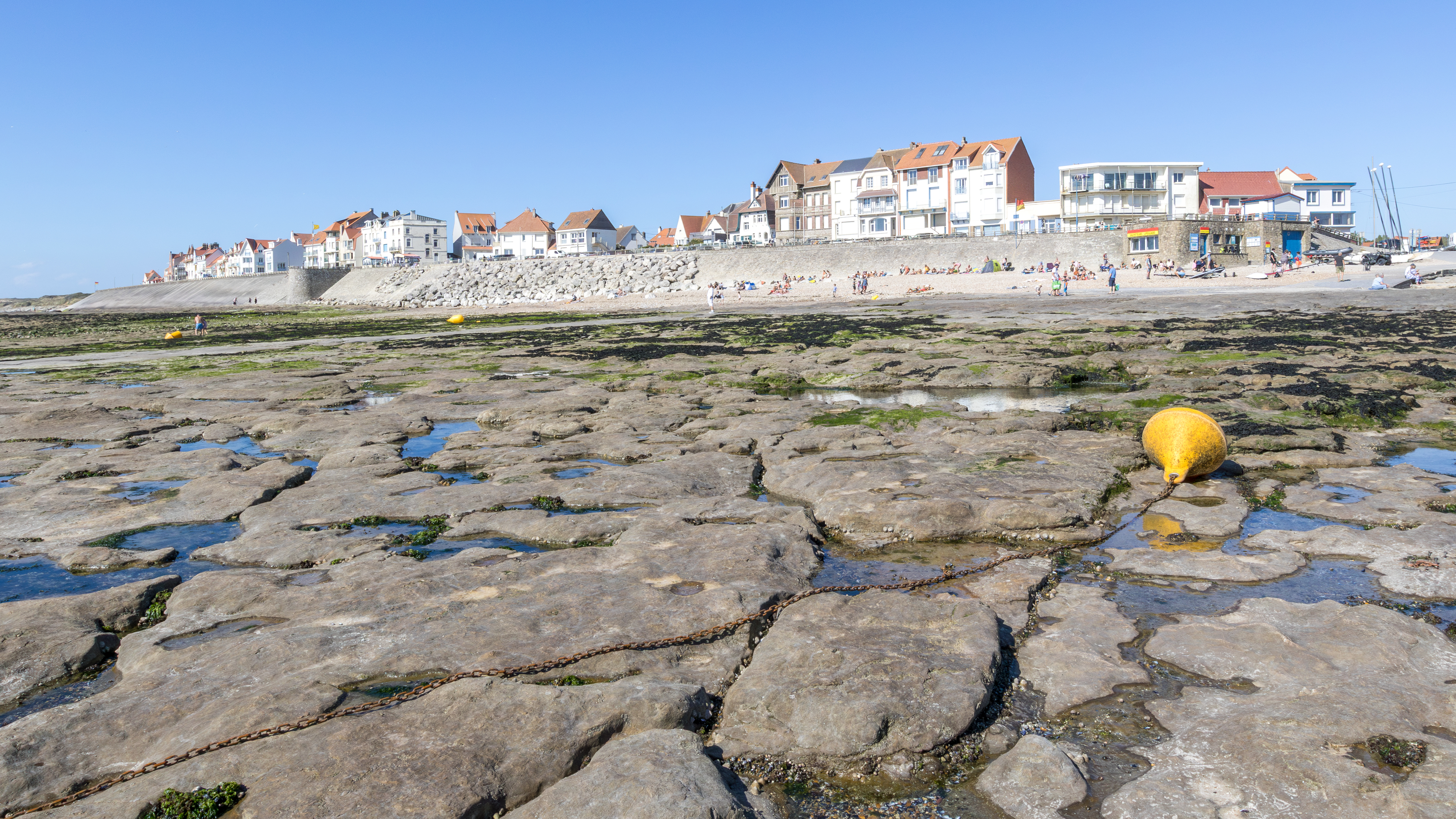
Ambleteuse seen from the beach.

== Population ==
Historical population
Year	Pop.	±% p.a.
1968	1,219	—
1975	1,441	+2.42%
1982	1,805	+3.27%
1990	2,007	+1.33%
1999	1,976	−0.17%
2007	1,825	−0.99%
2012	1,922	+1.04%
2017	1,843	−0.84%
2023	2,033	+1.65%
Source: INSEE

== Sights ==
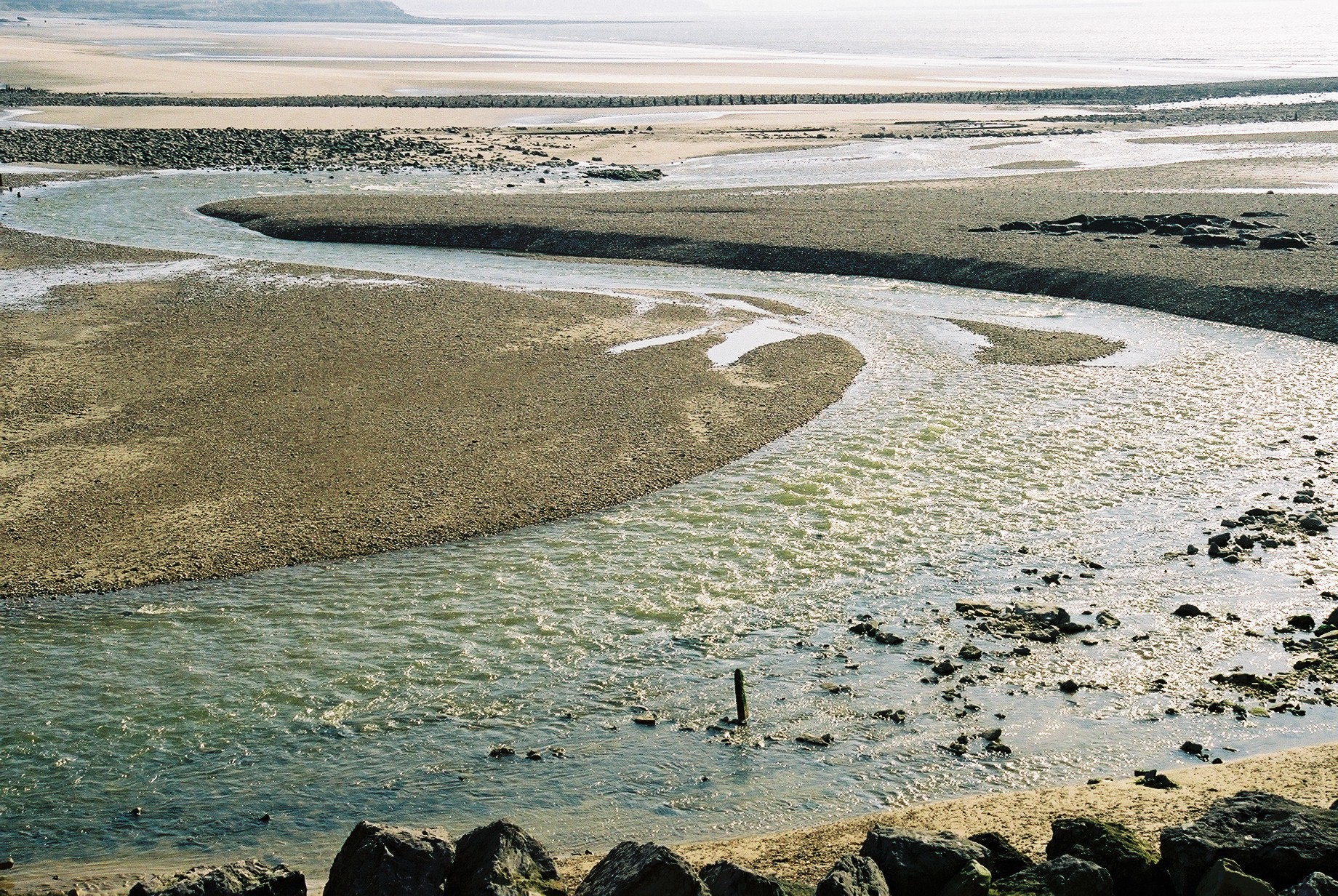
The Slack estuary

- The bay of the river Slack with its rare plants
- The fort, built by Vauban in the 17th century.
- Saint-Pierre's chapel;
- World War II museum;
- The remains of an English fort;
- Villas of the Belle Époque;
- Public gardens

== Personalities ==
- Julius Caesar may have built his port here to prepare for the invasion of Britain.
- St. Peter of Ambleteuse (7th century);
- Henri II, liberator of Ambleteuse from English rule;
- Napoléon Bonaparte, who built another port here to prepare for the invasion of Britain
- Jean Paul Destombe, geologist who determined the route under the sea for the channel tunnel
- Maurice Boitel, artist

== See also ==
- Communes of the Pas-de-Calais département
