= Rinxent =

Rinxent Erningsem
- Commune
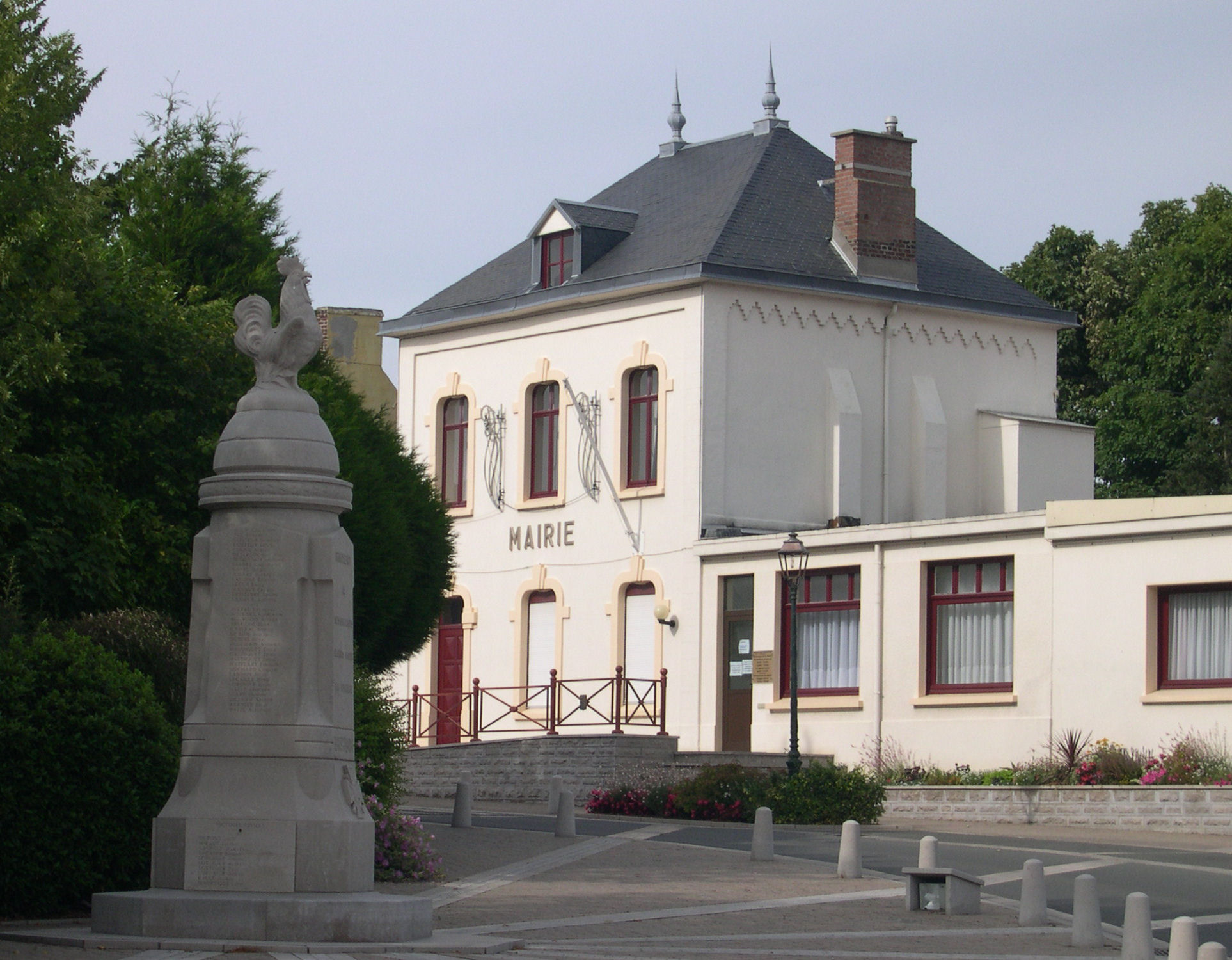
- The town hall of Rinxent

- Coat of arms
- Location of Rinxent
- Location within France Location within Hauts-de-France
- Coordinates: 50°48′20″N 1°44′20″E
- Country: France
- Region: Hauts-de-France
- Department: Pas-de-Calais
- Arrondissement: Boulogne-sur-Mer
- Canton: Desvres
- Intercommunality: CC Terre des Deux Caps

Government
  - Mayor (2020–2026): Nicolas Loeuillet
- Area^{1}: 8.38 km^{2} (3.24 sq mi)
- Elevation: 79 m (259 ft)
- Highest elevation: 90 m (300 ft)
- Lowest elevation: 7 m (23 ft)
- Population (2023): 2,987
  - Density: 356/km^{2} (923/sq mi)
- Time zone: UTC+01:00 (CET)
  - Summer (DST): UTC+02:00 (CEST)
- INSEE/Postal code: 62711 /62720
- ^{1} French Land Register data, which excludes lakes, ponds, glaciers > 1 km^{2} (0.386 sq mi or 247 acres) and river estuaries.

Rinxent (French pronunciation: [ʁɛ̃ksɑ̃]; West Flemish: Erningsem) is a commune in the Pas-de-Calais department in the Hauts-de-France region of France.

== Geography ==
Rinxent is a farming and light industrial town, situated some 9 miles (14 km) northeast of Boulogne, on the D191 road.

== Population ==
The inhabitants are called Rinxentois in French.

Historical population
Year	Pop.	±% p.a.
1968	3,340	—
1975	3,195	−0.63%
1982	3,094	−0.46%
1990	2,860	−0.98%
1999	2,797	−0.25%
2007	2,768	−0.13%
2012	2,771	+0.02%
2017	3,001	+1.61%
2023	2,987	−0.08%
Source: INSEE

== See also ==
- Communes of the Pas-de-Calais department
