= Leulinghen-Bernes =

- Commune
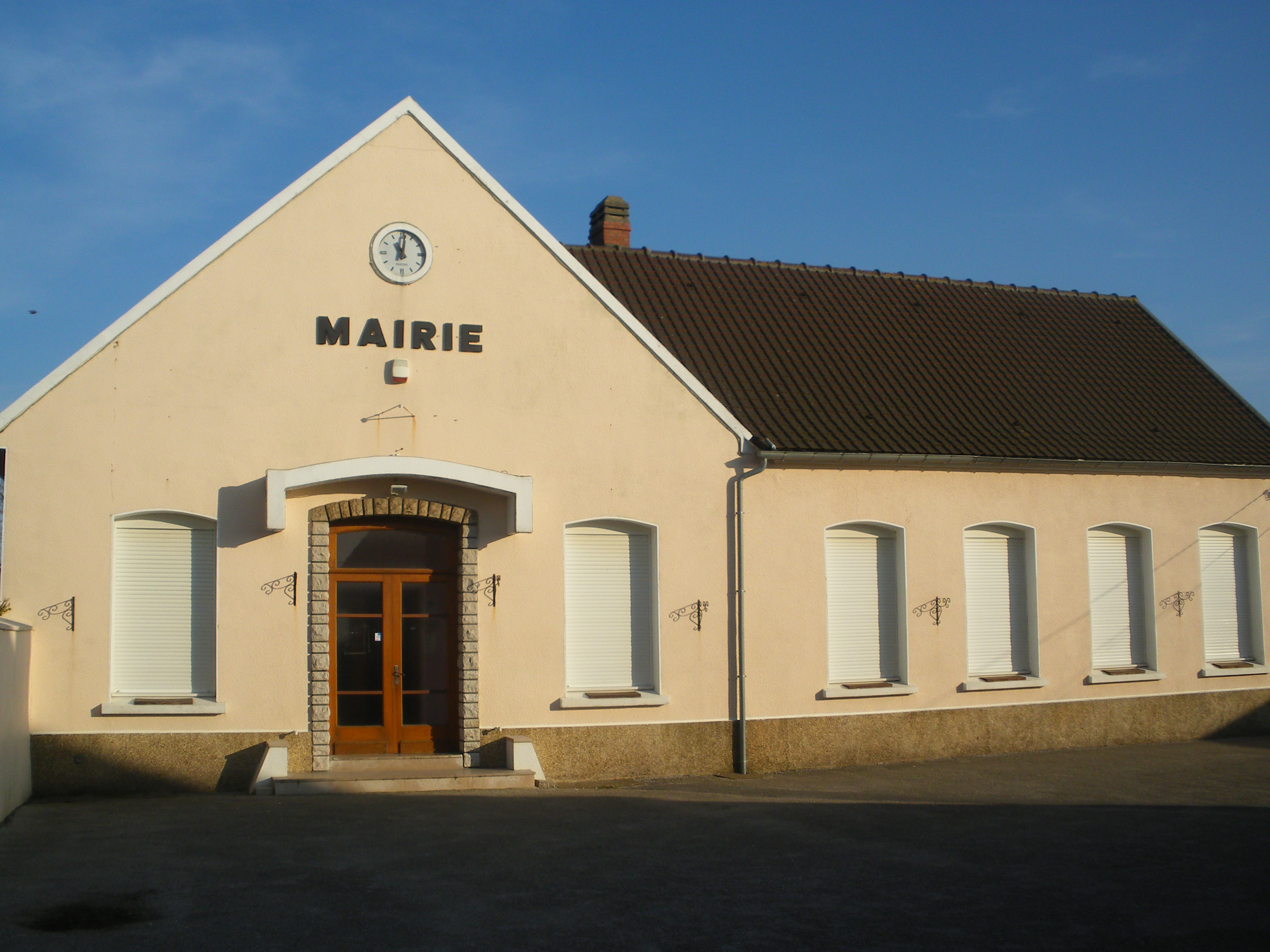
- The town hall of Leulinghen-Bernes

- Coat of arms
- Location of Leulinghen-Bernes
- Location within France Location within Hauts-de-France
- Coordinates: 50°49′51″N 1°43′09″E
- Country: France
- Region: Hauts-de-France
- Department: Pas-de-Calais
- Arrondissement: Boulogne-sur-Mer
- Canton: Desvres
- Intercommunality: CC Terre des Deux Caps

Government
  - Mayor (2020–2026): Jacques Fasquel
- Area^{1}: 6.9 km^{2} (2.7 sq mi)
- Elevation: 80 m (260 ft)
- Highest elevation: 100 m (330 ft)
- Lowest elevation: 8 m (26 ft)
- Population (2023): 540
  - Density: 78/km^{2} (200/sq mi)
- Time zone: UTC+01:00 (CET)
  - Summer (DST): UTC+02:00 (CEST)
- INSEE/Postal code: 62505 /62250
- ^{1} French Land Register data, which excludes lakes, ponds, glaciers > 1 km^{2} (0.386 sq mi or 247 acres) and river estuaries.

Leulinghen-Bernes (French pronunciation: [lœlɛ̃ɡɑ̃ bɛʁn]; Dutch: Leulingen; Picard: Leulinghin) is a commune in the Pas-de-Calais department in the Hauts-de-France region of France.

== Geography ==
Leulinghen-Bernes is situated some 10 miles (16 km) northeast of Boulogne, at the junction of the D191 and D231 roads. The A16 autoroute cuts through the middle of the commune's territory.

== Population ==
Historical population
Year	Pop.	±% p.a.
1968	250	—
1975	266	+0.89%
1982	266	+0.00%
1990	401	+5.26%
1999	398	−0.08%
2007	412	+0.43%
2012	427	+0.72%
2017	470	+1.94%
2023	540	+2.34%
Source: INSEE

== Places of interest ==
- The church of St.Leger, dating from the fourteenth century.

At the end of the 14th century, The French-English border crossed the center of the church. There were two entrance doors: the northern one for the subject of the English king, and the south one for the subjects of the French king.

== See also ==
- Communes of the Pas-de-Calais department
