= Pellouailles-les-Vignes =

- Part of Verrières-en-Anjou
- Location of Pellouailles-les-Vignes
- Location within France Location within Pays de la Loire
- Coordinates: 47°31′23″N 0°26′23″W
- Country: France
- Region: Pays de la Loire
- Department: Maine-et-Loire
- Arrondissement: Angers
- Canton: Angers-6
- Commune: Verrières-en-Anjou
- Area^{1}: 3.57 km^{2} (1.38 sq mi)
- Elevation: 37 m (121 ft)
- Highest elevation: 53 m (174 ft)
- Lowest elevation: 32 m (105 ft)
- Population (2022): 2,586
  - Density: 724/km^{2} (1,880/sq mi)
- Demonym(s): Pellouaillais, Pellouaillaise
- Time zone: UTC+01:00 (CET)
  - Summer (DST): UTC+02:00 (CEST)
- Postal code: 49112
- ^{1} French Land Register data, which excludes lakes, ponds, glaciers > 1 km^{2} (0.386 sq mi or 247 acres) and river estuaries.

Pellouailles-les-Vignes (French pronunciation: [pɛlwaj le viɲ]) is a former commune in the Maine-et-Loire department in western France. On 1 January 2016, it was merged into the new commune of Verrières-en-Anjou.

== See also ==
- Communes of the Maine-et-Loire department
