= Soucelles =

- Part of Rives-du-Loir-en-Anjou
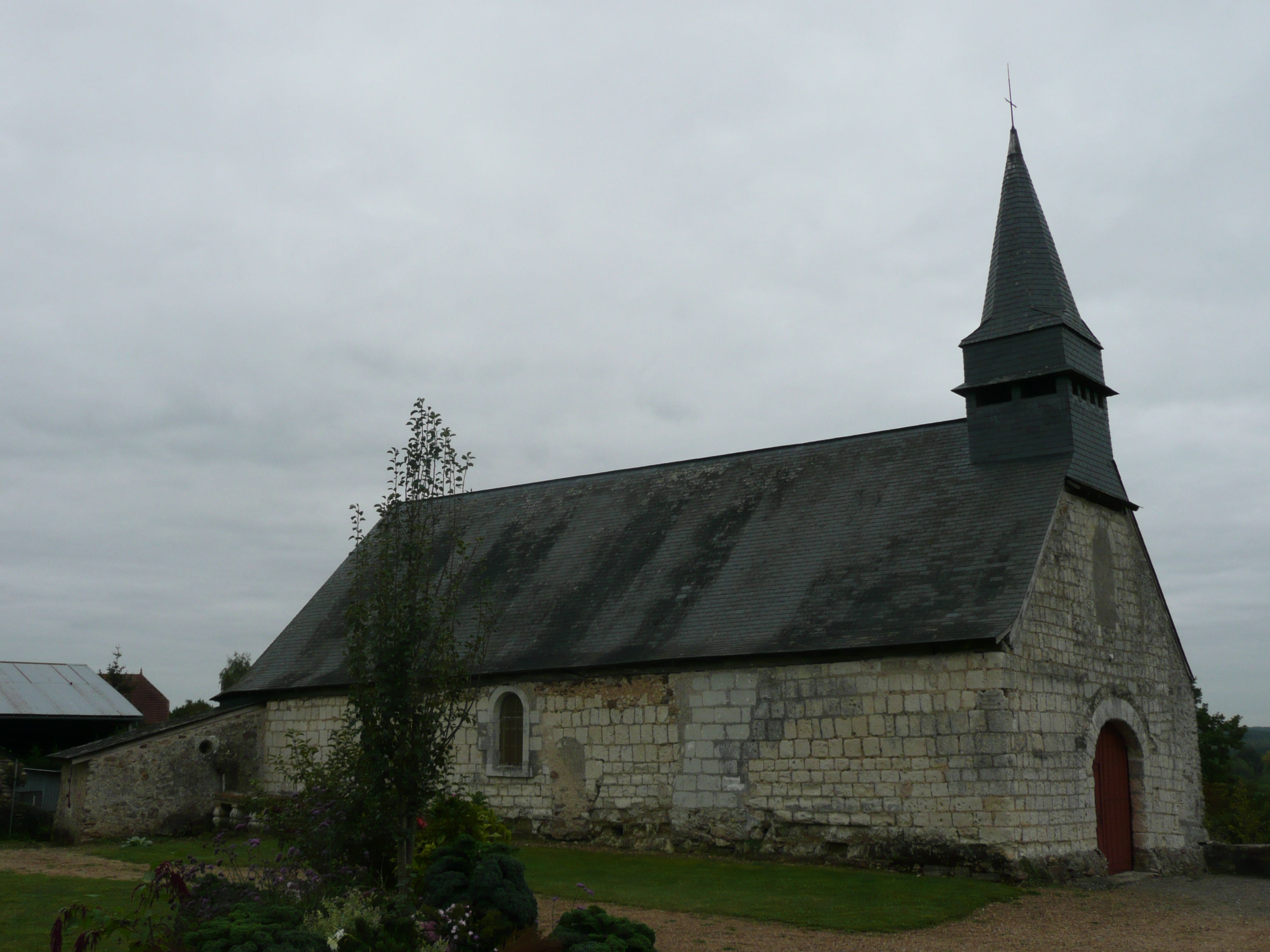
- The chapel of la Roche-Foulques

- Coat of arms
- Location of Soucelles
- Location within France Location within Pays de la Loire
- Coordinates: 47°34′08″N 0°25′01″W
- Country: France
- Region: Pays de la Loire
- Department: Maine-et-Loire
- Arrondissement: Angers
- Canton: Angers-6
- Commune: Rives-du-Loir-en-Anjou
- Area^{1}: 19.2 km^{2} (7.4 sq mi)
- Elevation: 50 m (160 ft)
- Highest elevation: 60 m (200 ft)
- Lowest elevation: 12 m (39 ft)
- Population (2022): 2,614
  - Density: 136/km^{2} (353/sq mi)
- Time zone: UTC+01:00 (CET)
  - Summer (DST): UTC+02:00 (CEST)
- Postal code: 49140
- ^{1} French Land Register data, which excludes lakes, ponds, glaciers > 1 km^{2} (0.386 sq mi or 247 acres) and river estuaries.

Soucelles (French pronunciation: [susɛl]) is a former commune in the Maine-et-Loire department in western France. On 1 January 2019, it was merged into the new commune Rives-du-Loir-en-Anjou.

== See also ==
- Communes of the Maine-et-Loire department
