= Chaumont-d'Anjou =

- Part of Jarzé-Villages
- Location of Chaumont-d'Anjou
- Location within France Location within Pays de la Loire
- Coordinates: 47°32′28″N 0°16′52″W
- Country: France
- Region: Pays de la Loire
- Department: Maine-et-Loire
- Arrondissement: Angers
- Canton: Angers-6
- Commune: Jarzé-Villages
- Area^{1}: 11.98 km^{2} (4.63 sq mi)
- Elevation: 35 m (115 ft)
- Highest elevation: 70 m (230 ft)
- Lowest elevation: 26 m (85 ft)
- Population (2022): 309
  - Density: 25.8/km^{2} (66.8/sq mi)
- Demonym(s): Chaumontais, Chaumontaise
- Time zone: UTC+01:00 (CET)
  - Summer (DST): UTC+02:00 (CEST)
- Postal code: 49140
- ^{1} French Land Register data, which excludes lakes, ponds, glaciers > 1 km^{2} (0.386 sq mi or 247 acres) and river estuaries.

Chaumont-d'Anjou (French pronunciation: [ʃomɔ̃ dɑ̃ʒu], literally Chaumont of Anjou) is a former commune in the Maine-et-Loire department of western France. On 1 January 2016, it was merged into the new commune of Jarzé-Villages.

== See also ==
- Communes of the Maine-et-Loire department
