= Édouard Louis Trouessart =

French zoologist

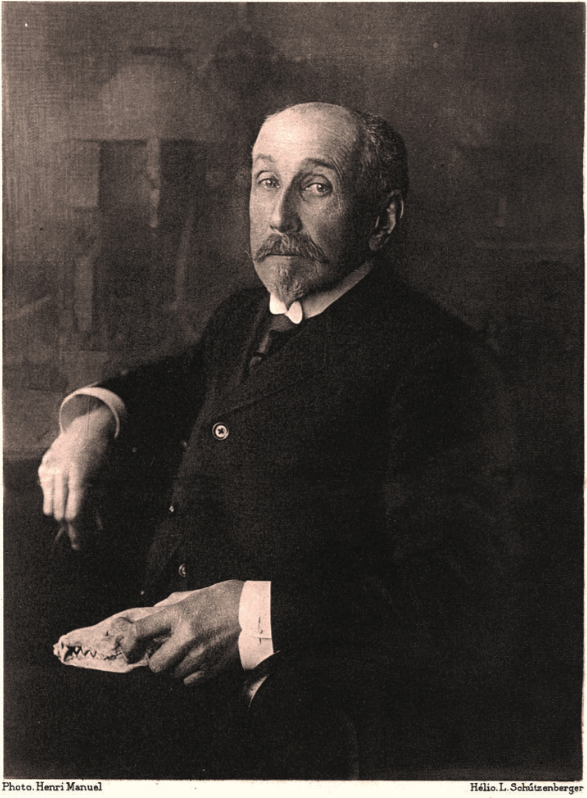
- Edouard Louis Trouessart by Henri Manuel
- Born: 25 August 1842; Angers, France
- Died: 30 June 1927 (aged 84); Paris
- Education: Strasbourg
- Known for: Work on mammals and acarians
- Scientific career
- Fields: Zoology (mammals and birds)
- Workplaces: University of Poitiers; hospital at Villevêque; museum of Angers
- Author abbrev. (zoology): Trouessart

Édouard Louis Trouessart (25 August 1842 – 30 June 1927) was a French zoologist born in Angers.

He studied military medicine in Strasbourg, but was forced to leave school due to serious health problems. In 1864 he started work as préparateur de physique at the Faculty of Poitiers, and in the process, dedicated his time and energies to natural history. He also resumed his studies in medicine, earning a medical doctorate in 1870. During the Franco-Prussian War, he served in the French army. Later, he was employed at the hospital in Villevêque.

From 1882 to 1884, he was director at the Museum of Angers, and in the meantime taught classes in natural history at the high school in Angers. In 1885 he relocated to Paris, where he worked with Alphonse Milne-Edwards (1835-1900). After the death of Emile Oustalet (1844-1905), he attained the chair of zoology (mammals and birds), a position he maintained until 1926.

== Selected writings ==
- Les microbes, les ferments et les moisissures. Avec 107 figures dans le texte (1886); later translated into English as "Microbes, ferments and moulds. With one hundred and seven illustrations". (New York : D. Appleton and co., 1886).
- Au bord de la mer: géologie, faune et flore des côtes de France de Dunkerque à Biarritz (1893) - The seaside: geology, fauna and flora on the coasts of France at Dunkerque and Biarritz.
- "Catalogus mammalium tam quam viventium fossilium" (1899).
- Faune des Mammifères d’Europe (1910) – Mammalian fauna of Europe.
- La distribution géographique des animaux (1922) - Geographical distribution of animals.
