= Lué-en-Baugeois =

- Part of Jarzé-Villages
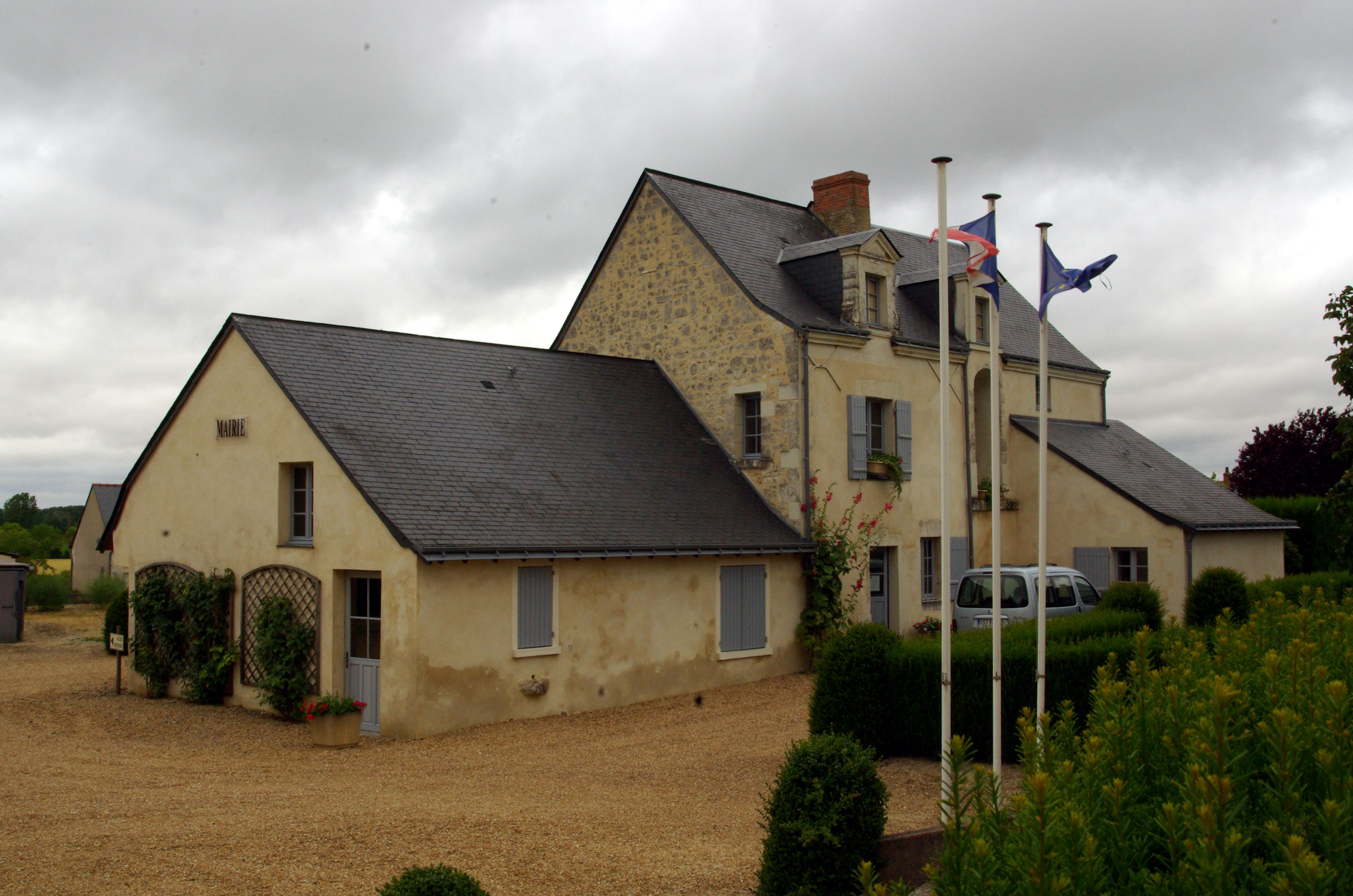
- Town hall
- Location of Lué-en-Baugeois
- Location within France Location within Pays de la Loire
- Coordinates: 47°31′34″N 0°16′42″W
- Country: France
- Region: Pays de la Loire
- Department: Maine-et-Loire
- Arrondissement: Angers
- Canton: Angers-6
- Commune: Jarzé-Villages
- Area^{1}: 7.42 km^{2} (2.86 sq mi)
- Elevation: 44 m (144 ft)
- Highest elevation: 89 m (292 ft)
- Lowest elevation: 27 m (89 ft)
- Population (2022): 290
  - Density: 39/km^{2} (100/sq mi)
- Demonym(s): Luéen, Luéenne
- Time zone: UTC+01:00 (CET)
  - Summer (DST): UTC+02:00 (CEST)
- Postal code: 49140
- ^{1} French Land Register data, which excludes lakes, ponds, glaciers > 1 km^{2} (0.386 sq mi or 247 acres) and river estuaries.

Lué-en-Baugeois (French pronunciation: [lɥe ɑ̃ boʒwa]) is a former commune in the Maine-et-Loire department in western France. On 1 January 2016, it was merged into the new commune of Jarzé-Villages.

== See also ==
- Communes of the Maine-et-Loire department
