= Huillé =

Commune in Maine-et-Loire, France

- Part of Huillé-Lézigné
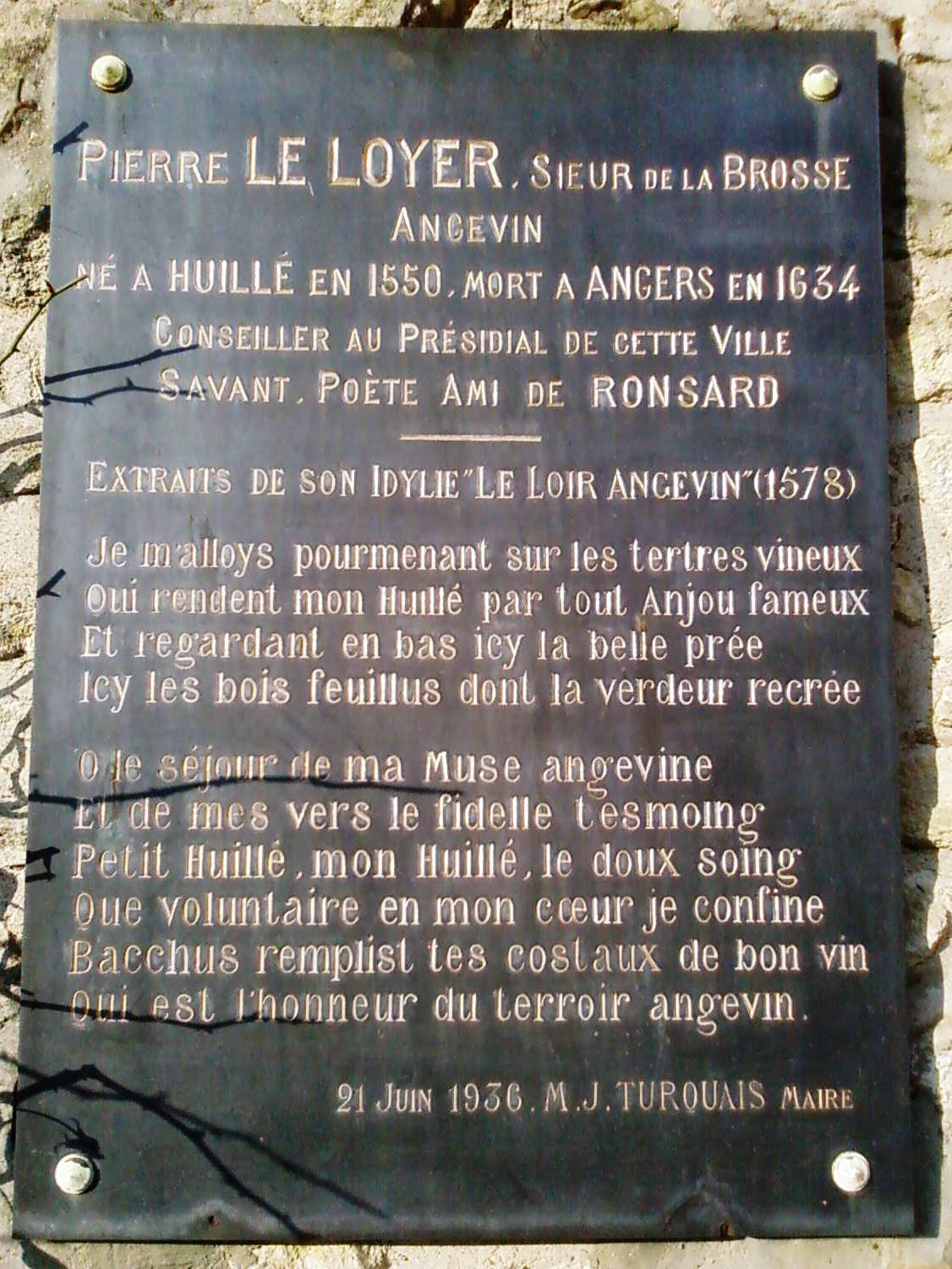
- The town hall of Huillé, plaque to the memory of Pierre Le Loyer.
- Location of Huillé
- Location within France Location within Pays de la Loire
- Coordinates: 47°38′55″N 0°18′14″W
- Country: France
- Region: Pays de la Loire
- Department: Maine-et-Loire
- Arrondissement: Angers
- Canton: Angers-6
- Commune: Huillé-Lézigné
- Area^{1}: 12.53 km^{2} (4.84 sq mi)
- Elevation: 52 m (171 ft)
- Highest elevation: 78 m (256 ft)
- Lowest elevation: 17 m (56 ft)
- Population (2022): 528
  - Density: 42.1/km^{2} (109/sq mi)
- Demonym(s): Huilléen, Huilléenne
- Time zone: UTC+01:00 (CET)
  - Summer (DST): UTC+02:00 (CEST)
- Postal code: 49430
- ^{1} French Land Register data, which excludes lakes, ponds, glaciers > 1 km^{2} (0.386 sq mi or 247 acres) and river estuaries.

Huillé (French pronunciation: [ɥije]) is a former commune in the Maine-et-Loire department in western France. On 1 January 2019, it was merged into the new commune Huillé-Lézigné.

== See also ==
- Communes of the Maine-et-Loire department
