= Jarzé =

Commune in Maine-et-Loire, France

- Part of Jarzé-Villages
- Location of Jarzé
- Location within France Location within Pays de la Loire
- Coordinates: 47°33′22″N 0°13′55″W
- Country: France
- Region: Pays de la Loire
- Department: Maine-et-Loire
- Arrondissement: Angers
- Canton: Angers-6
- Commune: Jarzé-Villages
- Area^{1}: 33.12 km^{2} (12.79 sq mi)
- Elevation: 63 m (207 ft)
- Highest elevation: 101 m (331 ft)
- Lowest elevation: 34 m (112 ft)
- Population (2022): 1,884
  - Density: 56.88/km^{2} (147.3/sq mi)
- Demonym(s): Jarzéen, Jarzéenne
- Time zone: UTC+01:00 (CET)
  - Summer (DST): UTC+02:00 (CEST)
- Postal code: 49140
- ^{1} French Land Register data, which excludes lakes, ponds, glaciers > 1 km^{2} (0.386 sq mi or 247 acres) and river estuaries.

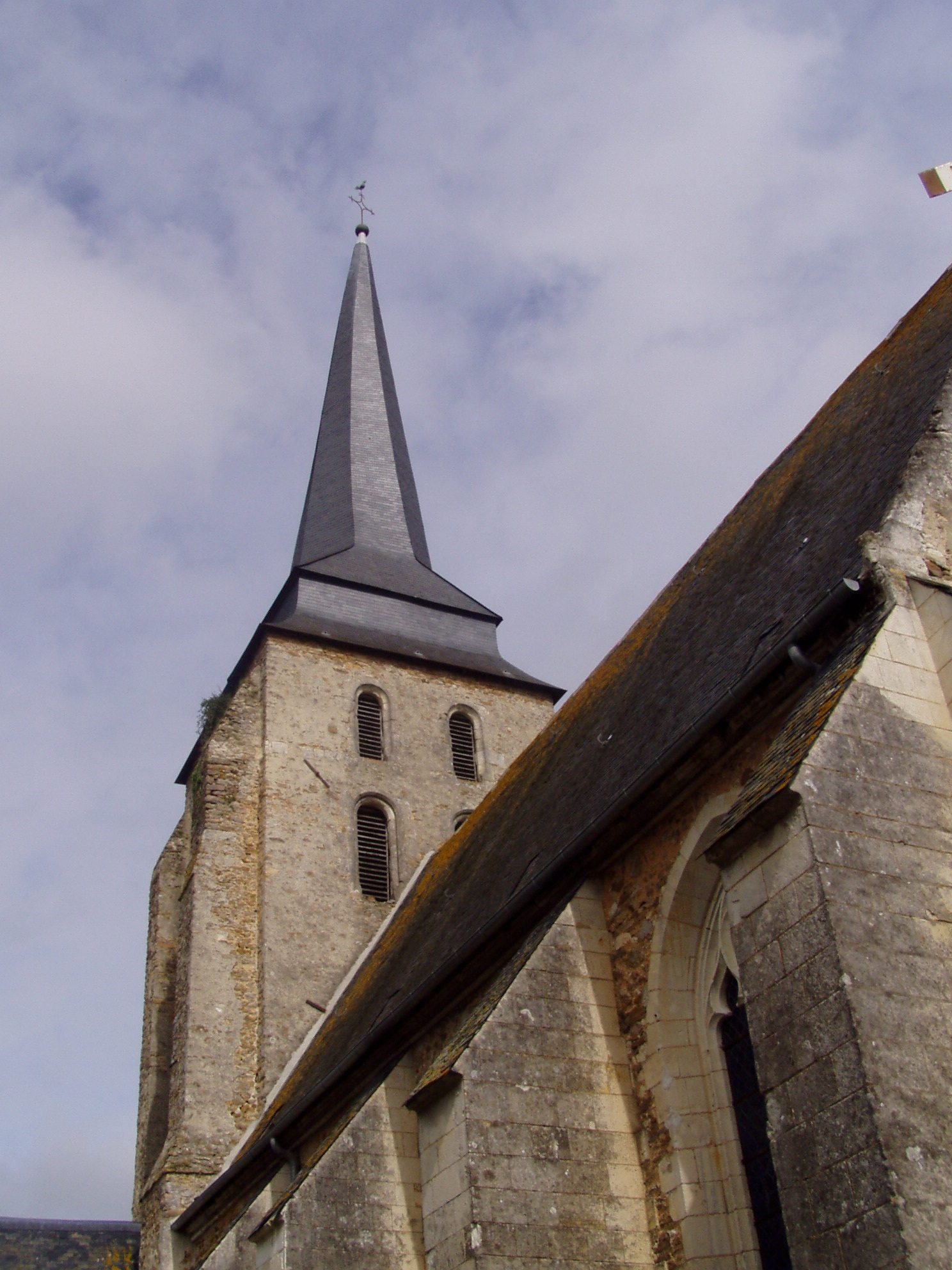
Belfry of the church of Sainte-Julitte

Jarzé (French pronunciation: [ʒaʁze]) is a former commune in the Maine-et-Loire department in western France. On 1 January 2016, it was merged into the new commune of Jarzé-Villages.
