= Charles de Lambert (aviator) =

European aviator

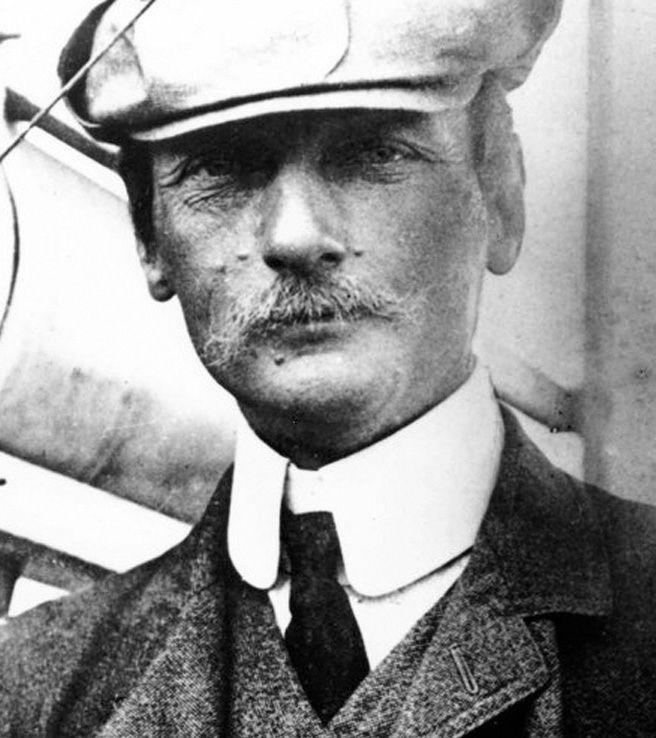
- Born: Charles Alexandre Maurice Joseph Marie Jules Stanislas Jacques count Charles de Lambert; 30 December 1865; Funchal, Madeira, Kingdom of Portugal
- Died: 26 February 1944 (aged 78); Saint-Sylvain-d'Anjou, Maine-et-Loire, France
- Occupation: aviator
- Spouses: Louise (divorced): Cordelia de Lambert
- Children: 1

Charles, Count de Lambert (30 December 1865, in Funchal – 26 February 1944, in Saint-Sylvain-d'Anjou) was an early European aviator. His full name was Charles Alexandre Maurice Joseph Marie Jules Stanislas Jacques Count Charles de Lambert, and he also was known as Charles, Comte de Lambert.

In 1904 Count Lambert built an experimental hydrofoil boat which was first tested in May 1904 on the River Seine near Paris. It had twin hulls and was powered by a 14-horsepower (10-kilowatt) De Dion-Bouton motor. Even with this modest power it was able to rise up on its hydrofoils until the hull just skimmed the water with only the propeller below the surface, reaching a speed of 20 mph (17 kn; 32 km/h).

A 1909 advertisement for Parisian House Ström Paris in La Vie au grand air, citing Count Lambert among the aviators equipped by the firm.

De Lambert was the first person in France to be taught to fly by Wilbur Wright. The first lesson took place at Le Mans on 28 October 1908, and by August 1909 he owned two Wright biplanes. On 18 October 1909 de Lambert "left the Juvisy Aerodrome at 4:36 o'clock in a Wright machine, flew across Paris to the Eiffel Tower, circled it, and returned to his starting point, arriving safely at 5:25." De Lambert claimed that he flew 300 feet (91 m) above the 984-foot (300 m) Eiffel Tower, which was nearly equal to Orville Wright's height record set in Berlin.

Lambert, along with Hubert Latham and Louis Blériot, was one of the three main contenders for the £1,000 prize offered by the Daily Mail for a successful crossing of the English Channel in an aeroplane, although he was not motivated by the monetary value. He took his pair of Wright Model A Flyers (Nos. 2 and 18) and set up camp at Wissant to practice and wait for good weather. Latham made the first real attempt, but foundered and landed on the water, and Lambert damaged his Flyers while practising. Louis Blériot won the prize on 25 July 1909.

== Personal life ==
Count de Lambert was married first to Louise de Lambert, with whom he had a daughter, Jane de Lambert. After they divorced, Louise married the Marquis de Ivanrey, Ricardo Soriano. After that marriage, Louise married the aviation engineer Léon Lemartin. Lemartin raised Jane as his own daughter. After Louise's death in December 1907 and Lemartin's death in an air crash in 1911, Lemartin's second wife Madeline and her second husband, Lemartin's brother Albert Lemartin, eventually parented Jane de Lambert.

Count de Lambert's second wife was Cordelia de Lambert.
