= Élisabeth Marquet =

French politician

Member of the National Assembly for Maine-et-Loire's 3rd constituency
- In office 1 August 2020 – 1 August 2020
- Preceded by: Jean-Charles Taugourdeau
- Succeeded by: Anne-Laure Blin

Personal details
- Born: 20 November 1960 (age 65) France
- Party: Republican

Élisabeth Marquet (born 20 November 1960) is a French politician who was Member of Parliament for Seine-et-Marne's 6th constituency for a day in 2020.

She is Mayor of Jarzé-Villages, and therefore had to resign her seat due to the dual mandate.
