= La Chapelle-Saint-Laud =

- Commune
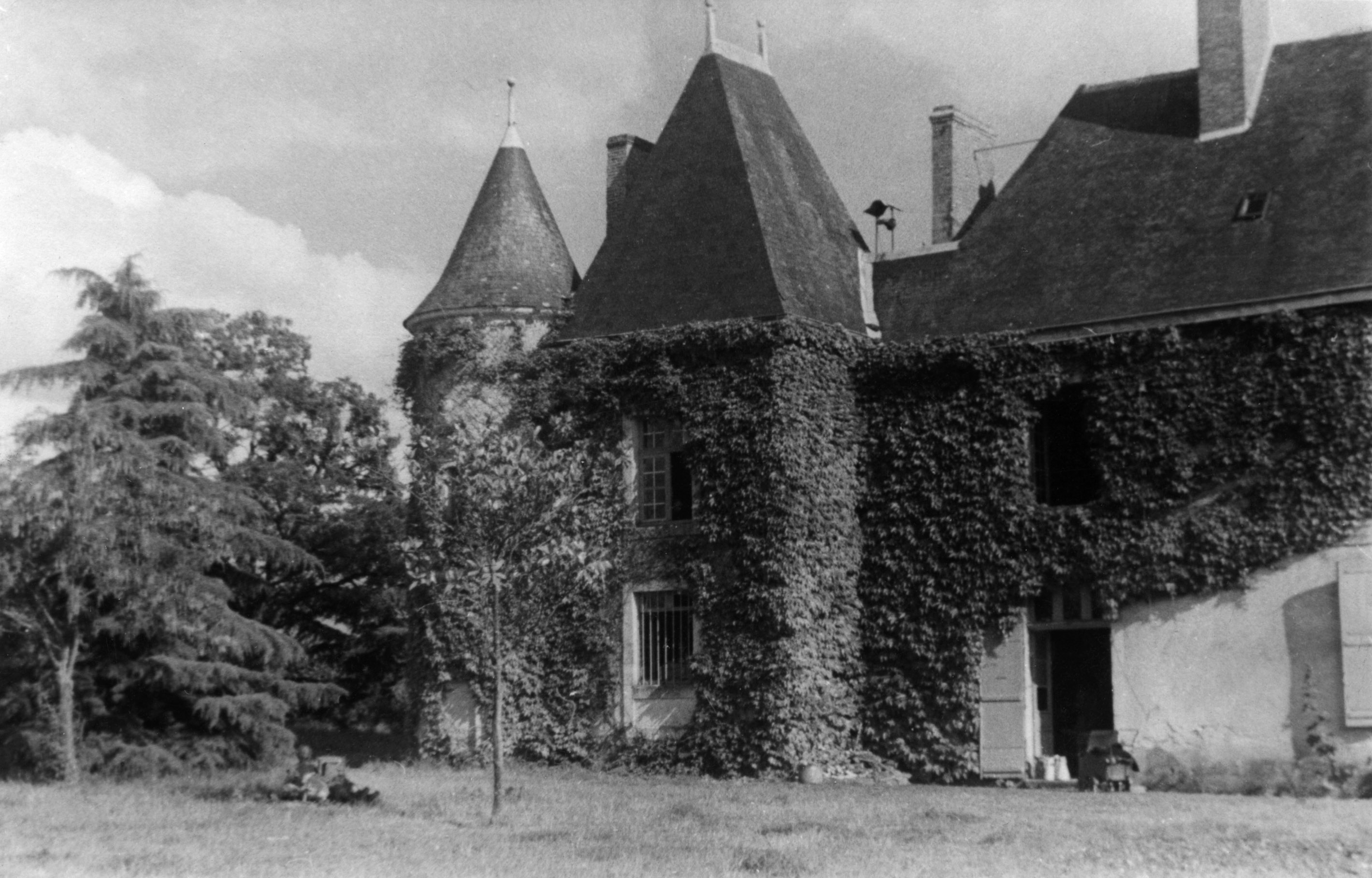
- The château de Princé in 1944
- Location of La Chapelle-Saint-Laud
- Location within France Location within Pays de la Loire
- Coordinates: 47°36′55″N 0°19′28″W
- Country: France
- Region: Pays de la Loire
- Department: Maine-et-Loire
- Arrondissement: Angers
- Canton: Angers-6

Government
  - Mayor (2020–2026): Jean-Paul Bompas
- Area^{1}: 10.63 km^{2} (4.10 sq mi)
- Elevation: 85 m (279 ft)
- Highest elevation: 98 m (322 ft)
- Lowest elevation: 28 m (92 ft)
- Population (2023): 837
  - Density: 78.7/km^{2} (204/sq mi)
- Demonym(s): Capellaudain, Capellaudaine
- Time zone: UTC+01:00 (CET)
  - Summer (DST): UTC+02:00 (CEST)
- INSEE/Postal code: 49076 /49140
- ^{1} French Land Register data, which excludes lakes, ponds, glaciers > 1 km^{2} (0.386 sq mi or 247 acres) and river estuaries.

La Chapelle-Saint-Laud (French pronunciation: [la ʃapɛl sɛ̃ lo]) is a commune in the Maine-et-Loire department of western France.

== See also ==
- Communes of the Maine-et-Loire department
