= Maine-et-Loire's 3rd constituency =

Constituency of the National Assembly of France

3rd constituency of Maine-et-Loire
- inline Constituency of the National Assembly of France

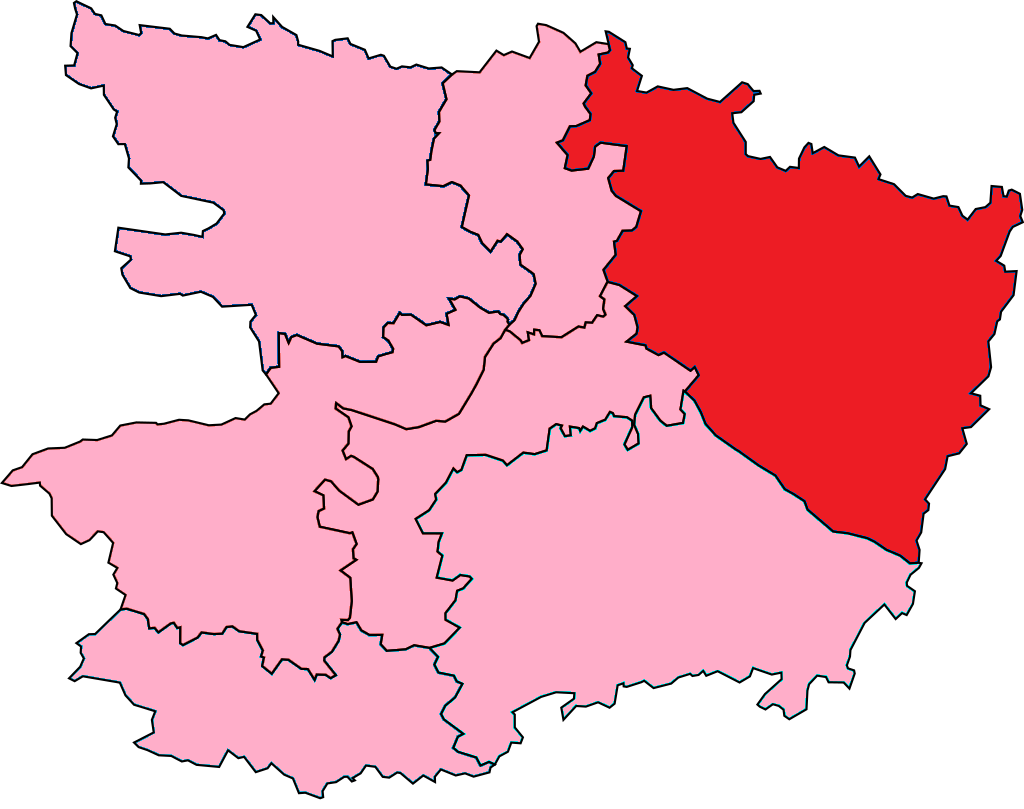
- Maine-et-Loire's 3rd Constituency shown within Maine-et-Loire
- Deputy: Anne-Laure Blin; LR
- Department: Maine-et-Loire
- Cantons: Allonnes, Baugé, Beaufort-en-Vallée, Durtal, Longué-Jumelles, Noyant, Saumur Nord, Seiches-sur-le-Loir
- Registered voters: 70380

The 3rd constituency of Maine-et-Loire (French: Troisième circonscription de Maine-et-Loire) is a French legislative constituency in the Maine-et-Loire département. Like the other 576 French constituencies, it elects one MP using a two round electoral system.

== Description ==
The 3rd Constituency of Maine-et-Loire lies in the north east of the department, including the northern half of Saumur (the southern half is included in Maine-et-Loire's 4th constituency).

The seat has supported parties of the centre right for the entirety of the 5th Republic. It was the only seat in Maine-et-Loire not to elect a deputy from Emmanuel Macron's centrist coalition at the 2017 elections.

== Assembly members ==
| Election | Member | Party |
|---|---|---|
| 1988 | Edmond Alphandéry | UDF |
| 1993 | Christian Martin | UDF |
| 1997 | Christian Martin | UDF |
| 2002 | Jean-Charles Taugourdeau | UMP |
| 2007 | Jean-Charles Taugourdeau | UMP |
| 2012 | Jean-Charles Taugourdeau | UMP |
| 2017 | Jean-Charles Taugourdeau | LR |
| 2020 | Elizabeth Marquet | LR |
| 2020 | Anne-Laure Blin | LR |
| 2022 | Anne-Laure Blin | LR |

== Election results ==
=== 2024 ===
| Candidate | Party | Alliance | First round | | Second round | |
| Candidate | Party | Alliance | Votes | % | Votes | % |
|---|---|---|---|---|---|---|
| Anne-Laure Blin | LR | | 11,572 | 23.87 | 26,768 | 57.17 |
| Edouard Bourgeault | RN | | 18,344 | 37.84 | 20,052 | 42.83 |
| Patrick Alexandre | LO | NPF | 9,656 | 19.92 | | |
| Simon Holley | REN | ENS | 8,168 | 16.85 | | |
| Patricia Peillon | LO | | 741 | 1.53 | | |
| Valid votes | | | 48,481 | 97.22 | 46,820 | 94.28 |
| Blank votes | | | 918 | 1.84 | 2,139 | 4.31 |
| Null votes | | | 470 | 0.94 | 702 | 1.41 |
| Turnout | | | 49,869 | 68.55 | 49,661 | 68.24 |
| Abstentions | | | 22,879 | 31.45 | 23,111 | 31.76 |
| Registered voters | | | 72,748 | | 72,772 | |
| Result | | | LR HOLD | | | |

=== 2022 ===
Legislative Election 2022: Maine-et-Loire's 3rd constituency
| Party | Candidate | Votes | % | ±% |
|---|---|---|---|---|
| LR (UDC) | Anne-Laure Blin | 8,328 | 24.73 | -0.51 |
| LFI (NUPÉS) | Véronique Roudevitch | 7,803 | 23.18 | +0.40 |
| RN | Bernard Lahondes | 7,411 | 22.01 | +12.23 |
| LREM (Ensemble) | Simon Holley | 7,290 | 21.65 | N/A |
| REC | Charles Babinet | 983 | 2.92 | N/A |
| PRG | David Robert | 954 | 2.83 | N/A |
| DLF (UPF) | Sylvie Baveret | 483 | 1.43 | N/A |
| LO | Patricia Peillon | 417 | 1.24 | N/A |
| Turnout | | 33,669 | 47.68 | +2.984 |
2nd round result
| LR (UDC) | Anne-Laure Blin | 19,020 | 60.65 | -0.49 |
| LFI (NUPÉS) | Véronique Roudevitch | 12,342 | 39.35 | +0.49 |
| Turnout | | 31,362 | 46.39 | +28.64 |
| LR hold | | | | |

=== 2020 ===
2020 by-election: Maine-et-Loire's 3rd constituency
| Party | Candidate | Votes | % | ±% |
|---|---|---|---|---|
| LR | Anne-Laure Blin | 3,113 | 25.24 | −1.93 |
| EELV | Daphnée Raveneau | 2,810 | 22.78 | +18.35 |
| DVD | Adrien Denis | 2,497 | 20.24 | N/A |
| DVD | Guy Bertin | 2,276 | 18.45 | N/A |
| RN | Patrice Lancien | 1,206 | 9.78 | −2.71 |
| Far left | Patricia Peillon | 260 | 2.11 | N/A |
| Others | N/A | 174 | | |
| Turnout | | 12,667 | 17.84 | −31.57 |
2nd round result
| LR | Anne-Laure Blin | 7,329 | 61.14 | +9.26 |
| EELV | Daphnée Raveneau | 4,658 | 38.86 | N/A |
| Turnout | | 12,609 | 17.75 | −23.08 |
| LR hold | | | | |

=== 2017 ===
Legislative Election 2017: Maine-et-Loire's 3rd constituency
| Party | Candidate | Votes | % | ±% |
|---|---|---|---|---|
| LREM | Anne Barrault | 10,417 | 29.96 | |
| LR | Jean-Charles Taugourdeau | 9,448 | 27.17 | |
| FN | Patrice Lancien | 4,344 | 12.49 | |
| LFI | Georges Chabrier | 3,400 | 9.78 | |
| DVD | Frédéric Mortier | 2,564 | 7.37 | |
| EELV | Daphnée Raveneau | 1,541 | 4.43 | |
| DVG | Alexandre Leroy | 1,483 | 4.26 | |
| PCF | Patrice Daviau | 840 | 2.42 | |
| Others | N/A | 736 | | |
| Turnout | | 34,773 | 49.41 | |
2nd round result
| LR | Jean-Charles Taugourdeau | 14,906 | 51.88 | |
| LREM | Anne Barrault | 13,827 | 48.12 | |
| Turnout | | 28,733 | 40.83 | |
| LR hold | | | | |

=== 2012 ===
Legislative Election 2012: Maine-et-Loire's 3rd constituency
| Party | Candidate | Votes | % | ±% |
|---|---|---|---|---|
| UMP | Jean-Charles Taugourdeau | 15,606 | 38.59 | |
| PRG | Jean-Michel Marchand | 13,244 | 32.75 | |
| FN | Jean-François De Brugiere | 4,180 | 10.34 | |
| DVD | Frédéric Mortier | 3,196 | 7.90 | |
| FG | Alain Pagano | 1,615 | 3.99 | |
| EELV | Nathalie Benard | 1,029 | 2.54 | |
| Others | N/A | 1,575 | | |
| Turnout | | 40,445 | 59.10 | |
2nd round result
| UMP | Jean-Charles Taugourdeau | 20,775 | 53.45 | |
| PRG | Jean-Michel Marchand | 18,095 | 46.55 | |
| Turnout | | 38,870 | 56.80 | |
| UMP hold | | | | |
