= Marcé =

- Commune
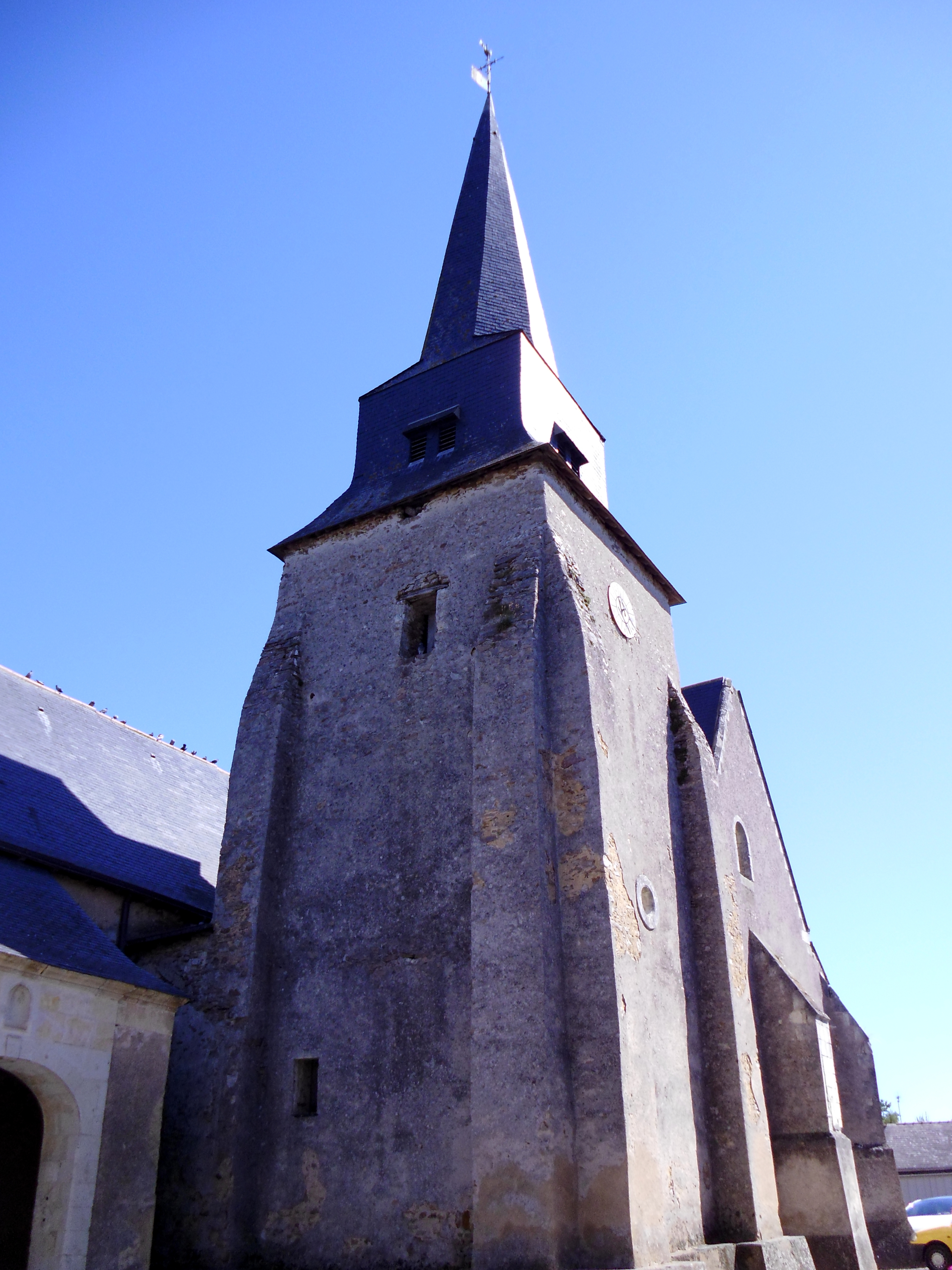
- The church of Saint Martin of Tours, in Marcé
- Location of Marcé
- Location within France Location within Pays de la Loire
- Coordinates: 47°34′51″N 0°19′30″W
- Country: France
- Region: Pays de la Loire
- Department: Maine-et-Loire
- Arrondissement: Angers
- Canton: Angers-6

Government
  - Mayor (2023–2026): Marc Soreau
- Area^{1}: 21.09 km^{2} (8.14 sq mi)
- Elevation: 33 m (108 ft)
- Highest elevation: 97 m (318 ft)
- Lowest elevation: 32 m (105 ft)
- Population (2023): 843
  - Density: 40.0/km^{2} (104/sq mi)
- Demonym(s): Marcéen, Marcéenne
- Time zone: UTC+01:00 (CET)
  - Summer (DST): UTC+02:00 (CEST)
- INSEE/Postal code: 49188 /49140
- ^{1} French Land Register data, which excludes lakes, ponds, glaciers > 1 km^{2} (0.386 sq mi or 247 acres) and river estuaries.

Marcé (French pronunciation: [maʁse]) is a commune in the Maine-et-Loire department in western France.

== See also ==
- Angers - Loire Airport
- Communes of the Maine-et-Loire department
