= Verrières-en-Anjou =

- Commune
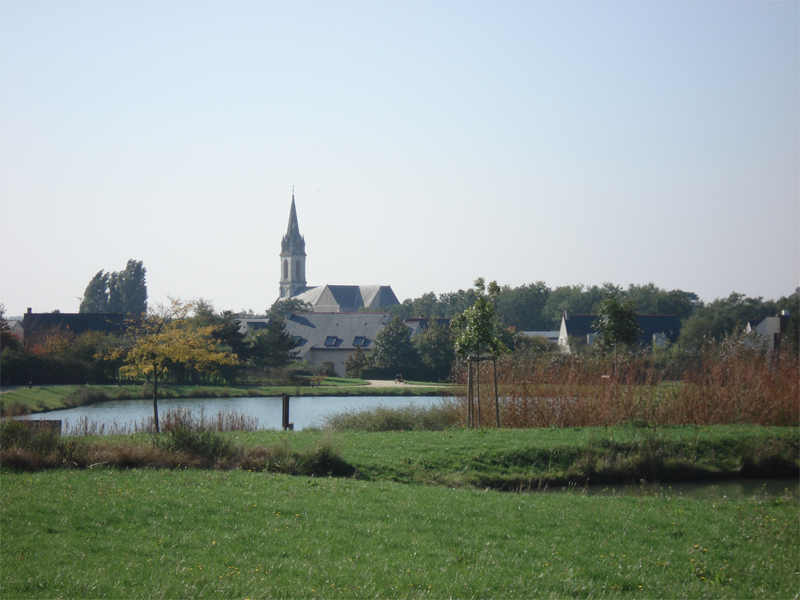
- A general view of Saint-Sylvain-d'Anjou
- Location of Verrières-en-Anjou
- Location within France Location within Pays de la Loire
- Coordinates: 47°31′12″N 0°28′16″W
- Country: France
- Region: Pays de la Loire
- Department: Maine-et-Loire
- Arrondissement: Angers
- Canton: Angers-6
- Intercommunality: CU Angers Loire Métropole

Government
  - Mayor (2022–2026): Geneviève Stall
- Area^{1}: 24.83 km^{2} (9.59 sq mi)
- Population (2023): 8,116
  - Density: 326.9/km^{2} (846.6/sq mi)
- Time zone: UTC+01:00 (CET)
  - Summer (DST): UTC+02:00 (CEST)
- INSEE/Postal code: 49323 /49480, 49112
- ^{1} French Land Register data, which excludes lakes, ponds, glaciers > 1 km^{2} (0.386 sq mi or 247 acres) and river estuaries.

Verrières-en-Anjou (French pronunciation: [vɛʁjɛʁ ɑ̃.n‿ɑ̃ʒu]) is a commune in the Maine-et-Loire department of western France. The municipality was established on 1 January 2016 and consists of the former communes of Saint-Sylvain-d'Anjou and Pellouailles-les-Vignes.

== Population ==
The population data given in the table below refer to the commune in its geography as of January 2025.

Historical population
Year	Pop.	±% p.a.
1968	2,114	—
1975	2,991	+5.08%
1982	3,547	+2.47%
1990	5,184	+4.86%
1999	6,707	+2.90%
2007	6,825	+0.22%
2012	6,957	+0.38%
2017	7,153	+0.56%
2023	8,116	+2.13%
Source: INSEE

== See also ==
- Communes of the Maine-et-Loire department
