= Jarzé-Villages =

- Commune
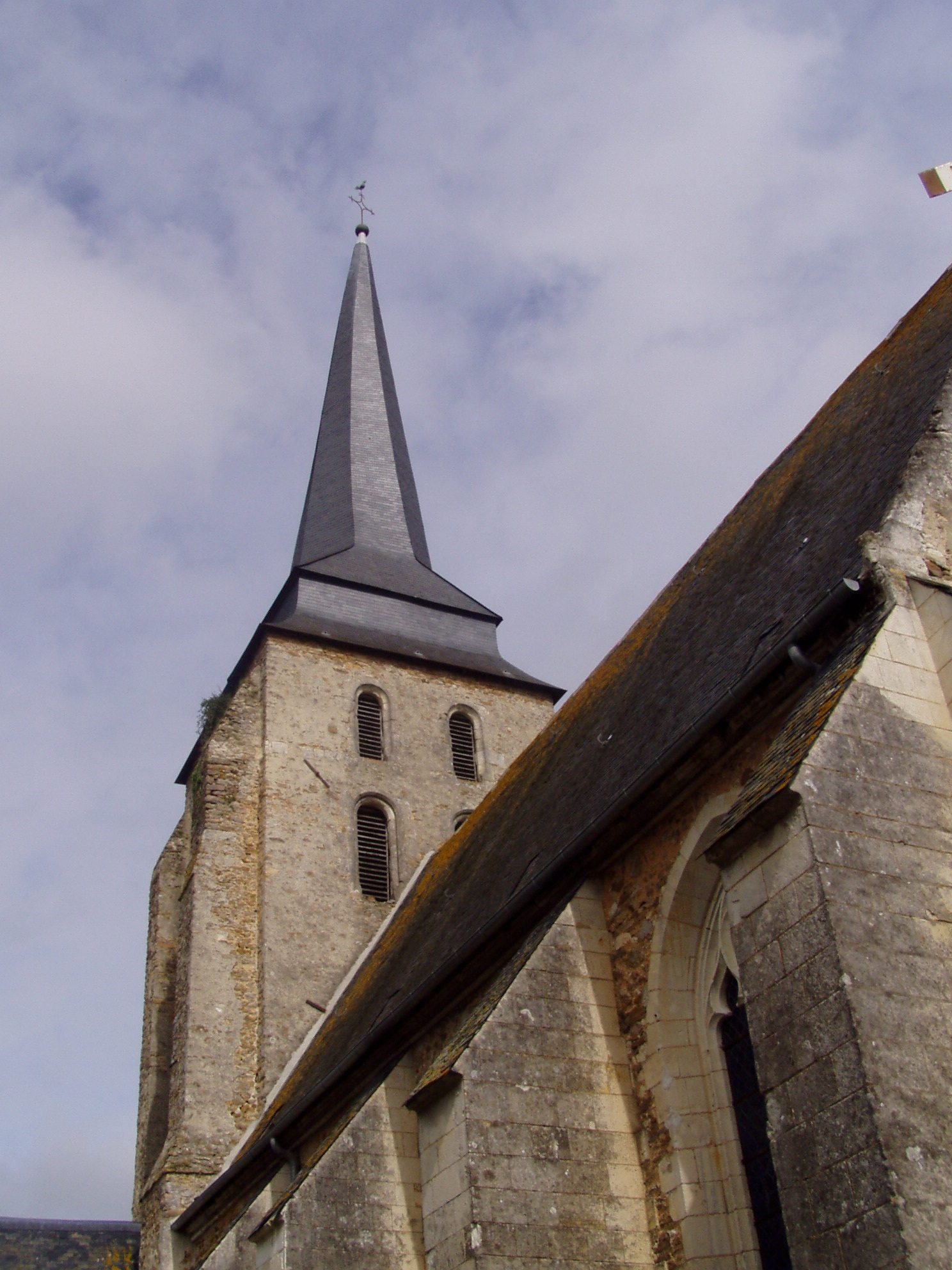
- The church in Jarzé
- Location of Jarzé-Villages
- Location within France Location within Pays de la Loire
- Coordinates: 47°33′18″N 0°13′59″W
- Country: France
- Region: Pays de la Loire
- Department: Maine-et-Loire
- Arrondissement: Angers
- Canton: Angers-6

Government
  - Mayor (2020–2026): Élisabeth Marquet
- Area^{1}: 60.50 km^{2} (23.36 sq mi)
- Population (2023): 2,798
  - Density: 46.25/km^{2} (119.8/sq mi)
- Time zone: UTC+01:00 (CET)
  - Summer (DST): UTC+02:00 (CEST)
- INSEE/Postal code: 49163 /49140
- ^{1} French Land Register data, which excludes lakes, ponds, glaciers > 1 km^{2} (0.386 sq mi or 247 acres) and river estuaries.

Jarzé-Villages (French pronunciation: [ʒaʁze vilaʒ]) is a commune in the Maine-et-Loire department of western France. The municipality was established on 1 January 2016 and consists of the former communes of Jarzé, Beauvau, Chaumont-d'Anjou and Lué-en-Baugeois.

== Population ==
Population data refer to the area corresponding with the commune as of January 2025.

Historical population
Year	Pop.	±% p.a.
1968	1,978	—
1975	1,986	+0.06%
1982	2,044	+0.41%
1990	2,182	+0.82%
1999	2,147	−0.18%
2007	2,401	+1.41%
2012	2,661	+2.08%
2017	2,742	+0.60%
2023	2,798	+0.34%
Source: INSEE

== See also ==
- Communes of the Maine-et-Loire department
