= Angers–Loire Airport =

Angers–Loire Airport Aéroport d'Angers–Loire
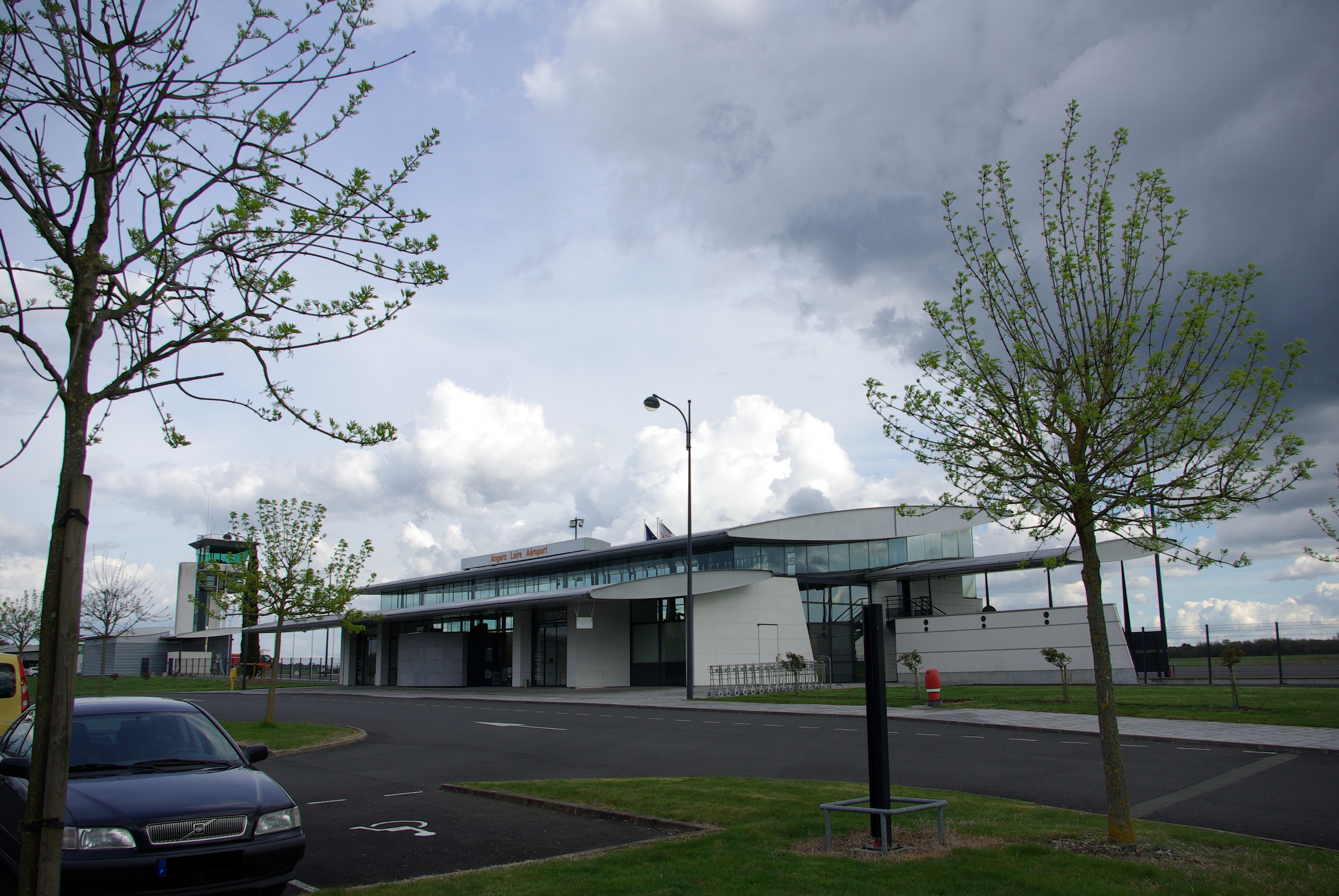
- IATA: ANE; ICAO: LFJR

Summary
- Airport type: Public
- Operator: Société de Gestion de l'Aéroport Angers-Marcé (SGAAM)
- Serves: Angers, France
- Location: Marcé, France
- Elevation AMSL: 59 m / 194 ft
- Coordinates: 47°33′37″N 000°18′44″W
- Website: AngersLoireAeroport.fr

Map
- Location of airport in Pays de la Loire Location of Pays de la Loire in France

Runways
| Direction | Length | | Surface |
| Direction | m | ft | Surface |
|---|---|---|---|
| 08/26 | 1,800 | 5,906 | Asphalt |
| 08L/26R | 720 | 2,362 | Grass |
| 08R/26L | 1,100 | 3,609 | Grass |
- Source: AIP France

Angers–Loire Airport (French: Aéroport d'Angers–Loire, IATA: ANE, ICAO: LFJR) is an airport located in Marcé, 20 kilometres (11 nautical miles) northeast of Angers, both communes of the Maine-et-Loire department in the Pays de la Loire region of France. It is also known as Angers – Marcé Airport (French: Aéroport d'Angers – Marcé).

== Facilities ==
The airport resides at an elevation of 194 feet (59 m) above mean sea level. It has one asphalt paved runway designated 08/26 and measuring 1,800 by 45 metres (5,906 ft × 148 ft). It also has two grass runways: 08L/26R is 720 by 50 metres (2,362 ft × 164 ft) and 08R/26L is 1,100 by 100 metres (3,609 ft × 328 ft).

== Airlines and destinations ==
In April 2017, when Air France Hop announced a service to Bastia, the airport was not served by any scheduled commercial traffic. Previously, Angers was served during the summer by two airlines: British Airways to London-City and IGavion (operated by SkyTaxi) to Nice and Toulouse. As of April 2021, Air France Hop cancelled its sole seasonal route to Bastia which it ran since 2017 As of November 30, 2022, the airport has no scheduled passenger flights.
