= Sermaise, Maine-et-Loire =

Sermaise
- Commune
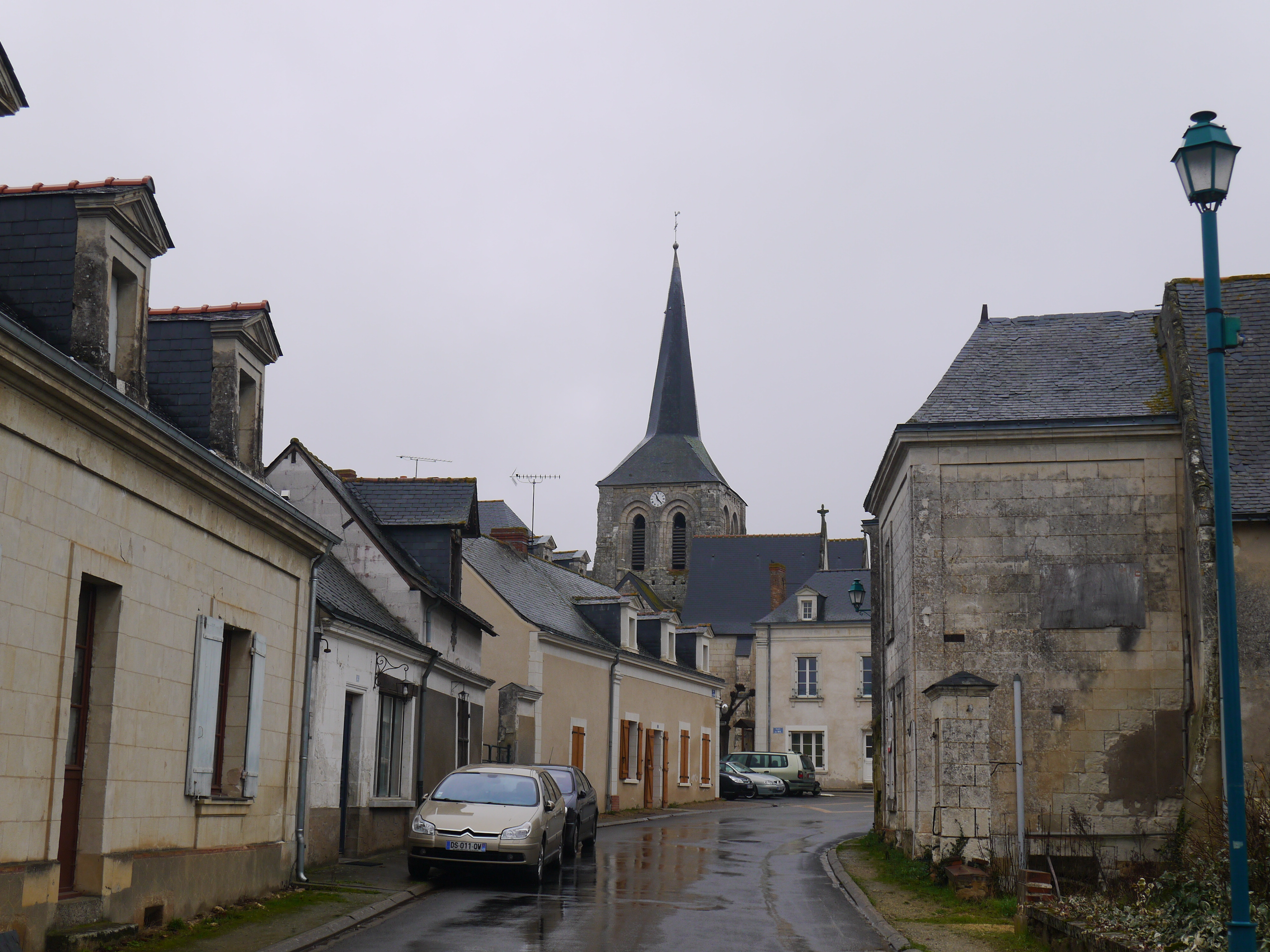
- The church of Saint-Hilaire
- Location of Sermaise
- Location within France Location within Pays de la Loire
- Coordinates: 47°31′31″N 0°12′43″W
- Country: France
- Region: Pays de la Loire
- Department: Maine-et-Loire
- Arrondissement: Angers
- Canton: Angers-6

Government
  - Mayor (2020–2026): Gildas Marek
- Area^{1}: 7.19 km^{2} (2.78 sq mi)
- Highest elevation: 70 m (230 ft)
- Lowest elevation: 30 m (98 ft)
- Population (2023): 345
  - Density: 48.0/km^{2} (124/sq mi)
- Demonym: Sermate
- Time zone: UTC+01:00 (CET)
  - Summer (DST): UTC+02:00 (CEST)
- INSEE/Postal code: 49334 /49140
- ^{1} French Land Register data, which excludes lakes, ponds, glaciers > 1 km^{2} (0.386 sq mi or 247 acres) and river estuaries.

Sermaise (French pronunciation: [sɛʁmɛz]) is a commune in the Maine-et-Loire department in western France.

== See also ==
- Communes of the Maine-et-Loire department
