= Seiches-sur-le-Loir =

- Commune
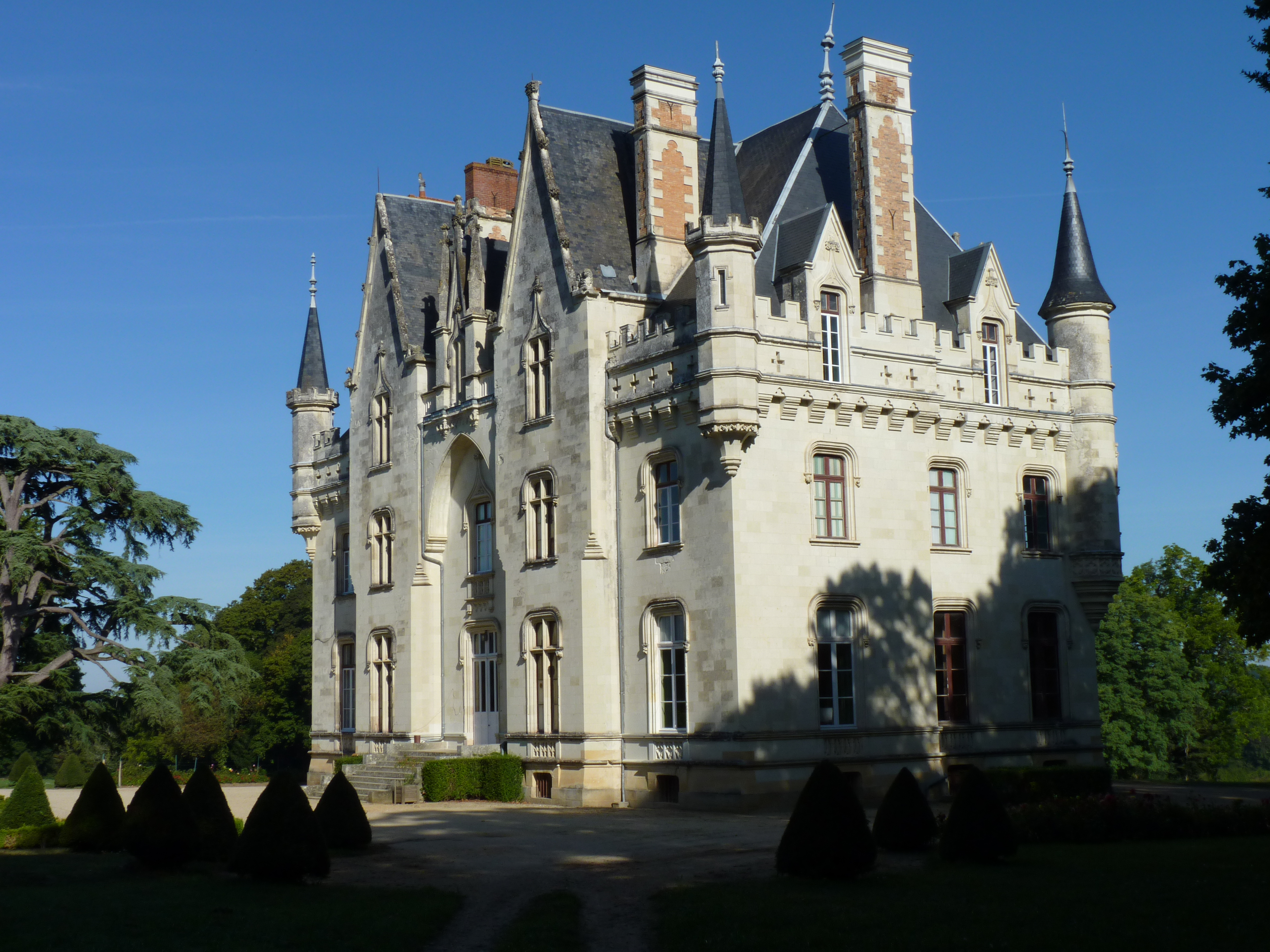
- The Château of Brignac

- Coat of arms
- Location of Seiches-sur-le-Loir
- Location within France Location within Pays de la Loire
- Coordinates: 47°34′25″N 0°21′17″W
- Country: France
- Region: Pays de la Loire
- Department: Maine-et-Loire
- Arrondissement: Angers
- Canton: Angers-6

Government
  - Mayor (2020–2026): Thierry De Villoutreys
- Area^{1}: 28.83 km^{2} (11.13 sq mi)
- Highest elevation: 64 m (210 ft)
- Lowest elevation: 15 m (49 ft)
- Population (2023): 2,844
  - Density: 98.65/km^{2} (255.5/sq mi)
- Demonym(s): Seichois, Seichoise
- Time zone: UTC+01:00 (CET)
  - Summer (DST): UTC+02:00 (CEST)
- INSEE/Postal code: 49333 /49140
- Website: www.seiches-sur-le-loir.fr
- ^{1} French Land Register data, which excludes lakes, ponds, glaciers > 1 km^{2} (0.386 sq mi or 247 acres) and river estuaries.

Seiches-sur-le-Loir (French pronunciation: [sɛʃ syʁ lə lwaʁ], literally Seiches on the Loir) is a commune in the Maine-et-Loire department in western France. It is around 20 km north-east of Angers.

== Population ==
Historical population
Year	Pop.	±% p.a.
1968	2,199	—
1975	2,168	−0.20%
1982	2,207	+0.26%
1990	2,248	+0.23%
1999	2,412	+0.79%
2007	3,042	+2.94%
2012	2,970	−0.48%
2017	2,978	+0.05%
2023	2,844	−0.76%
Source: INSEE

== See also ==
- Communes of the Maine-et-Loire department
