= Cornillé-les-Caves =

- Commune
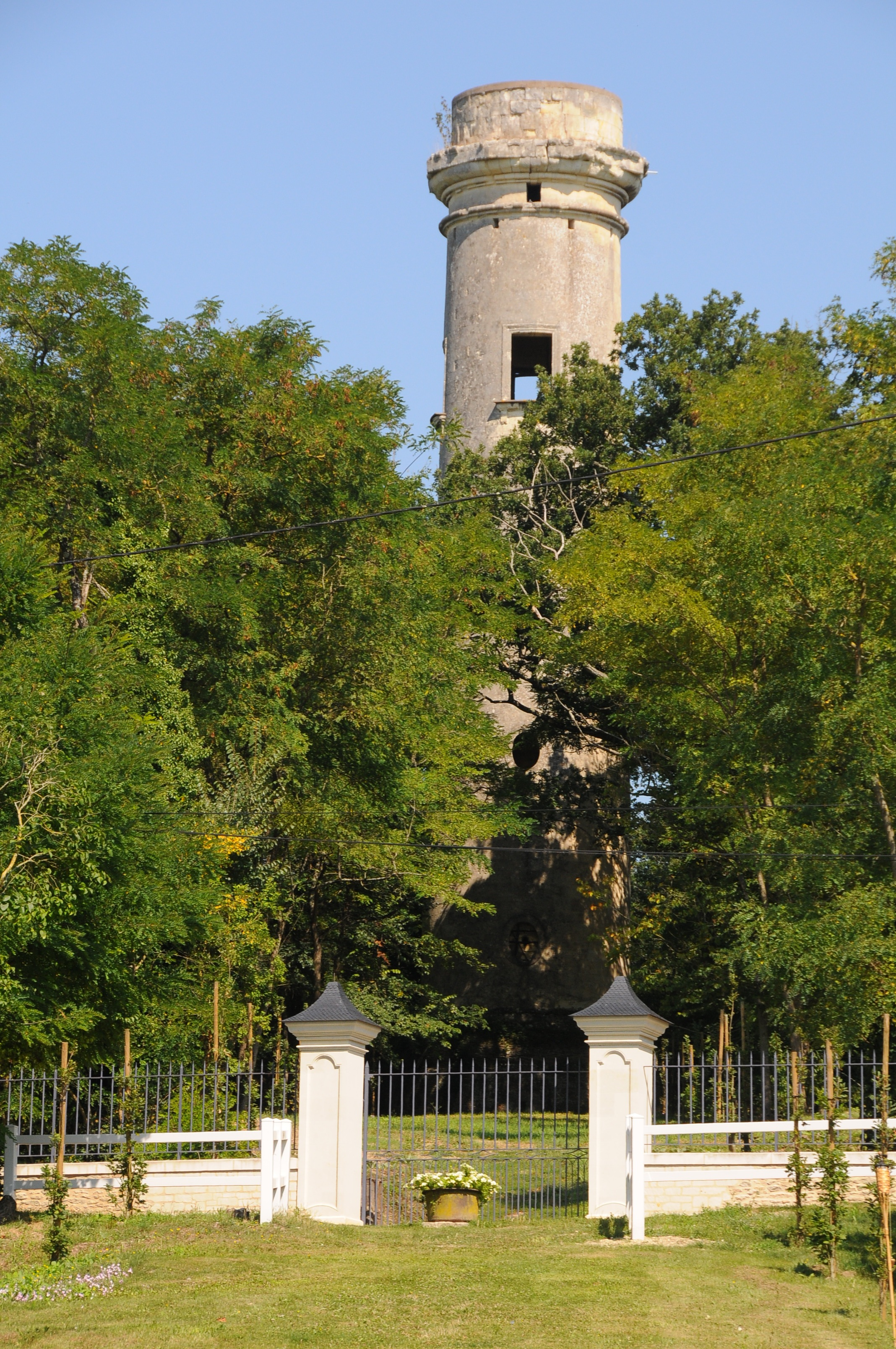
- The tower of Cornillé
- Location of Cornillé-les-Caves
- Location within France Location within Pays de la Loire
- Coordinates: 47°30′01″N 0°18′01″W
- Country: France
- Region: Pays de la Loire
- Department: Maine-et-Loire
- Arrondissement: Angers
- Canton: Angers-6

Government
  - Mayor (2020–2026): Paul Rabouan
- Area^{1}: 10.38 km^{2} (4.01 sq mi)
- Elevation: 80 m (260 ft)
- Highest elevation: 80 m (260 ft)
- Lowest elevation: 19 m (62 ft)
- Population (2023): 484
  - Density: 46.6/km^{2} (121/sq mi)
- Demonym(s): Cornillois, Cornilloise
- Time zone: UTC+01:00 (CET)
  - Summer (DST): UTC+02:00 (CEST)
- INSEE/Postal code: 49107 /49140
- ^{1} French Land Register data, which excludes lakes, ponds, glaciers > 1 km^{2} (0.386 sq mi or 247 acres) and river estuaries.

Cornillé-les-Caves (French pronunciation: [kɔʁnije le kav]) is a commune in the Maine-et-Loire department in western France.

== See also ==
- Communes of the Maine-et-Loire department
