= Saint-Barthélemy-d'Anjou =

- Commune
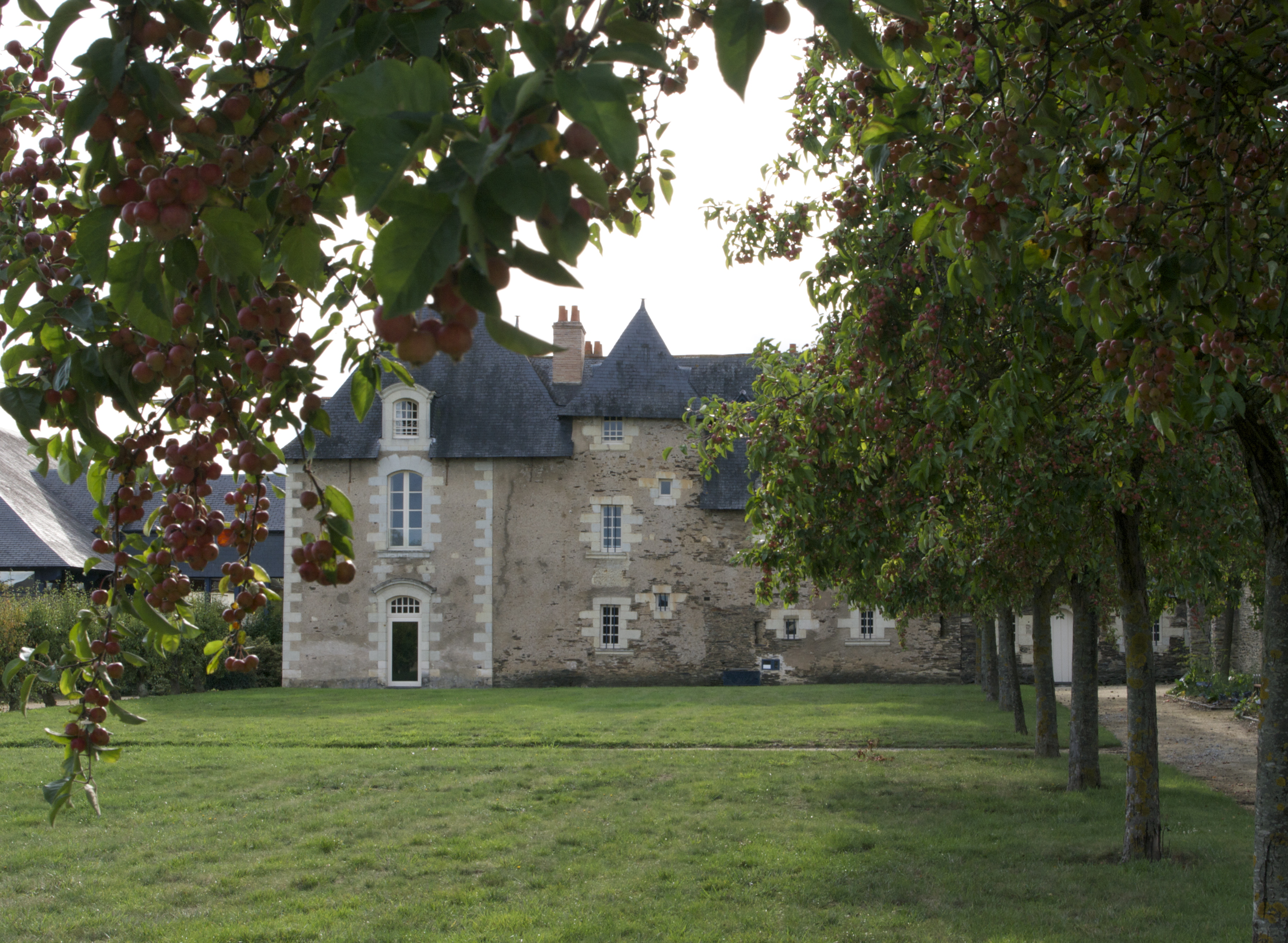
- The manor of la Ranloue
- Location of Saint-Barthélemy-d'Anjou
- Location within France Location within Pays de la Loire
- Coordinates: 47°28′05″N 0°29′35″W
- Country: France
- Region: Pays de la Loire
- Department: Maine-et-Loire
- Arrondissement: Angers
- Canton: Angers-6
- Intercommunality: CU Angers Loire Métropole

Government
  - Mayor (2020–2026): Dominique Bréjeon
- Area^{1}: 14.58 km^{2} (5.63 sq mi)
- Elevation: 44 m (144 ft)
- Highest elevation: 49 m (161 ft)
- Lowest elevation: 22 m (72 ft)
- Population (2023): 9,720
  - Density: 667/km^{2} (1,730/sq mi)
- Time zone: UTC+01:00 (CET)
  - Summer (DST): UTC+02:00 (CEST)
- INSEE/Postal code: 49267 /49124
- ^{1} French Land Register data, which excludes lakes, ponds, glaciers > 1 km^{2} (0.386 sq mi or 247 acres) and river estuaries.

Saint-Barthélemy-d'Anjou (French pronunciation: [sɛ̃ baʁtelemi dɑ̃ʒu], literally Saint-Barthélemy of Anjou) is a commune in the Maine-et-Loire department in western France. It is known as the place where Cointreau orange liqueur is produced. Cointreau was invented and previously produced in Angers, though the factory has now been moved to the industrial zone of Saint-Barthélémy d'Anjou, from where it is now exported globally.

== Population ==
Historical population
Year	Pop.	±% p.a.
1968	4,241	—
1975	5,965	+4.99%
1982	9,129	+6.27%
1990	9,369	+0.32%
1999	9,832	+0.54%
2007	9,003	−1.10%
2012	8,837	−0.37%
2017	9,195	+0.80%
2023	9,720	+0.93%
Source: INSEE

== See also ==
- Communes of the Maine-et-Loire department
