= Saint-Sylvain-d'Anjou =

- Part of Verrières-en-Anjou
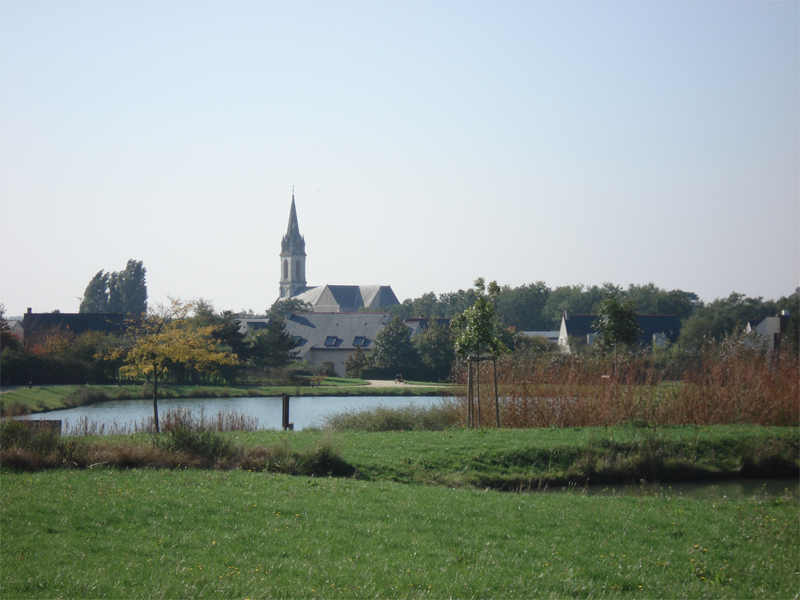
- Location of Saint-Sylvain-d'Anjou
- Location within France Location within Pays de la Loire
- Coordinates: 47°31′12″N 0°28′12″W
- Country: France
- Region: Pays de la Loire
- Department: Maine-et-Loire
- Arrondissement: Angers
- Canton: Angers-6
- Commune: Verrières-en-Anjou
- Area^{1}: 21.26 km^{2} (8.21 sq mi)
- Elevation: 36 m (118 ft)
- Highest elevation: 53 m (174 ft)
- Lowest elevation: 17 m (56 ft)
- Population (2022): 5,360
  - Density: 252/km^{2} (653/sq mi)
- Time zone: UTC+01:00 (CET)
  - Summer (DST): UTC+02:00 (CEST)
- Postal code: 49480
- ^{1} French Land Register data, which excludes lakes, ponds, glaciers > 1 km^{2} (0.386 sq mi or 247 acres) and river estuaries.

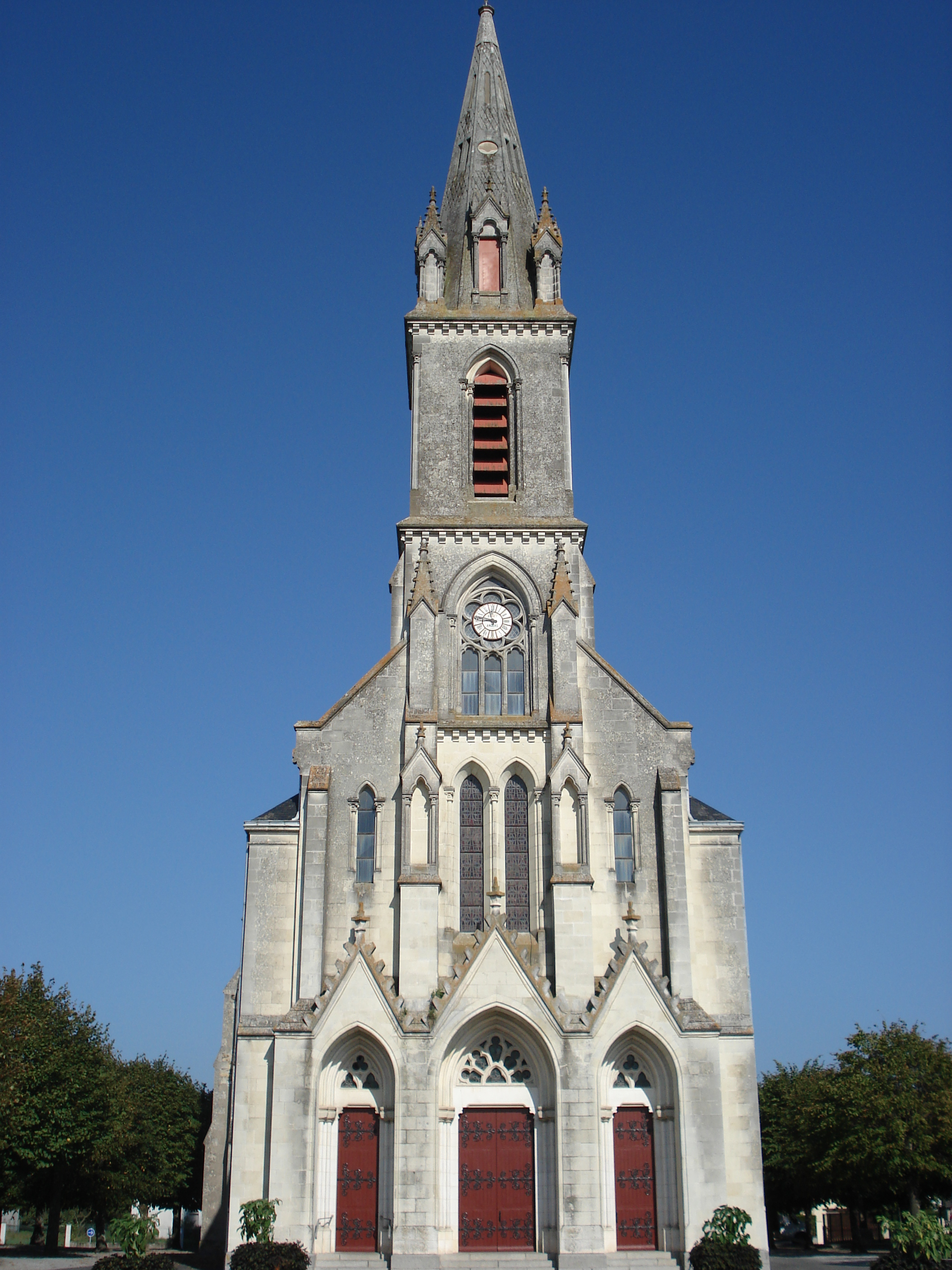
Eglise de Saint-Sylvain d'Anjou

Saint-Sylvain-d'Anjou (French pronunciation: [sɛ̃ silvɛ̃ dɑ̃ʒu]) is a former commune in the Maine-et-Loire department in western France. On 1 January 2016, it was merged into the new commune of Verrières-en-Anjou.

== See also ==
- Communes of the Maine-et-Loire department
