= Huillé-Lézigné =

Lézigné
- Commune
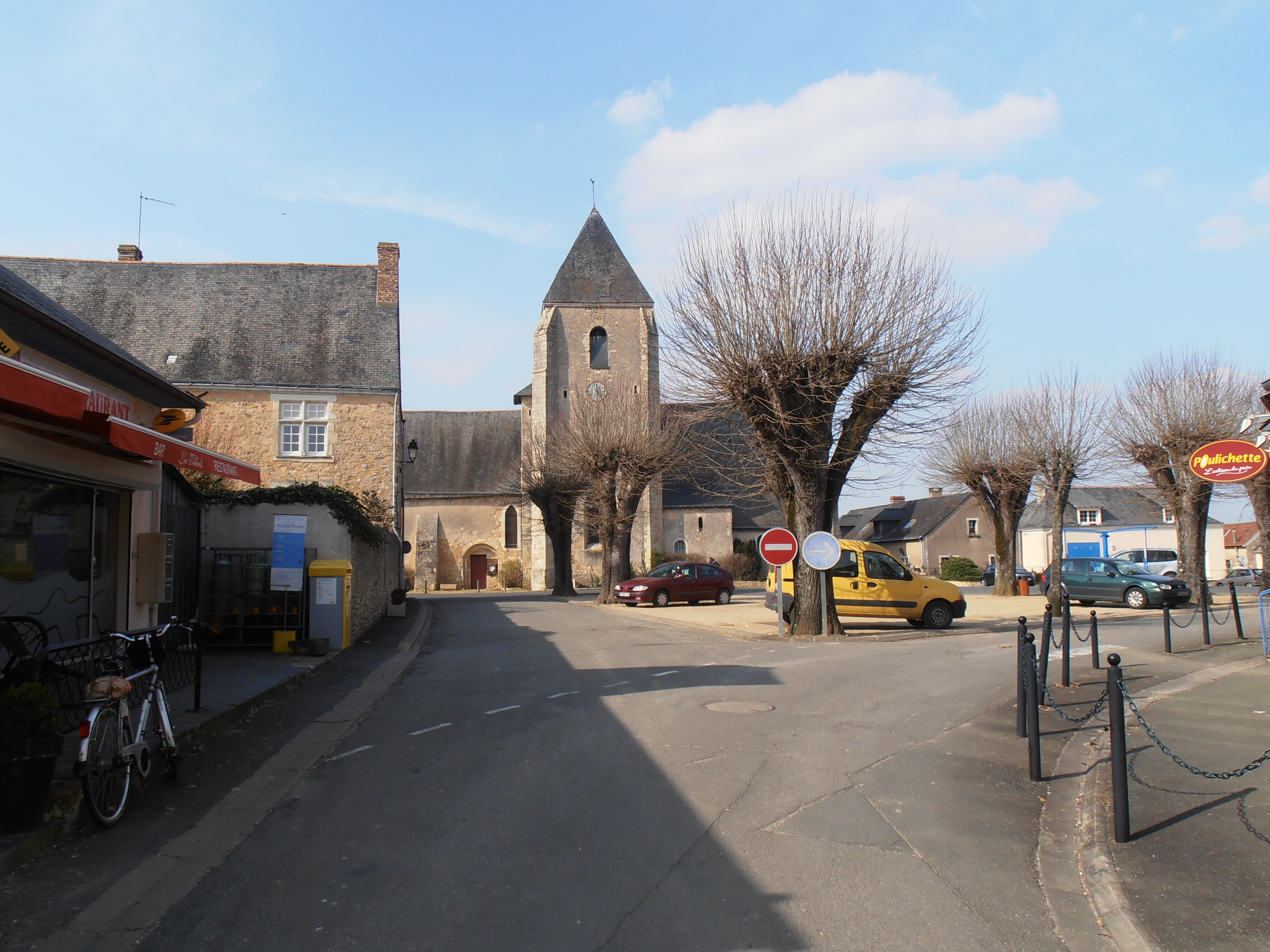
- The centre of Lézigné
- Location of Lézigné
- Location within France Location within Pays de la Loire
- Coordinates: 47°38′14″N 0°17′36″W
- Country: France
- Region: Pays de la Loire
- Department: Maine-et-Loire
- Arrondissement: Angers
- Canton: Angers-6
- Intercommunality: Anjou Loir et Sarthe

Government
  - Mayor (2020–2026): Sylvie Chiron-Pesnel
- Area^{1}: 21.83 km^{2} (8.43 sq mi)
- Highest elevation: 78 m (256 ft)
- Lowest elevation: 17 m (56 ft)
- Population (2023): 1,298
  - Density: 59.46/km^{2} (154.0/sq mi)
- Time zone: UTC+01:00 (CET)
  - Summer (DST): UTC+02:00 (CEST)
- INSEE/Postal code: 49174 /49430
- ^{1} French Land Register data, which excludes lakes, ponds, glaciers > 1 km^{2} (0.386 sq mi or 247 acres) and river estuaries.

Huillé-Lézigné (French pronunciation: [ɥije leziɲe]) is a commune in the Maine-et-Loire department in western France. It was established on 1 January 2019 by merger of the former communes of Lézigné (the seat) and Huillé.

== See also ==
- Communes of the Maine-et-Loire department
