= Jean-Charles Taugourdeau =

French politician

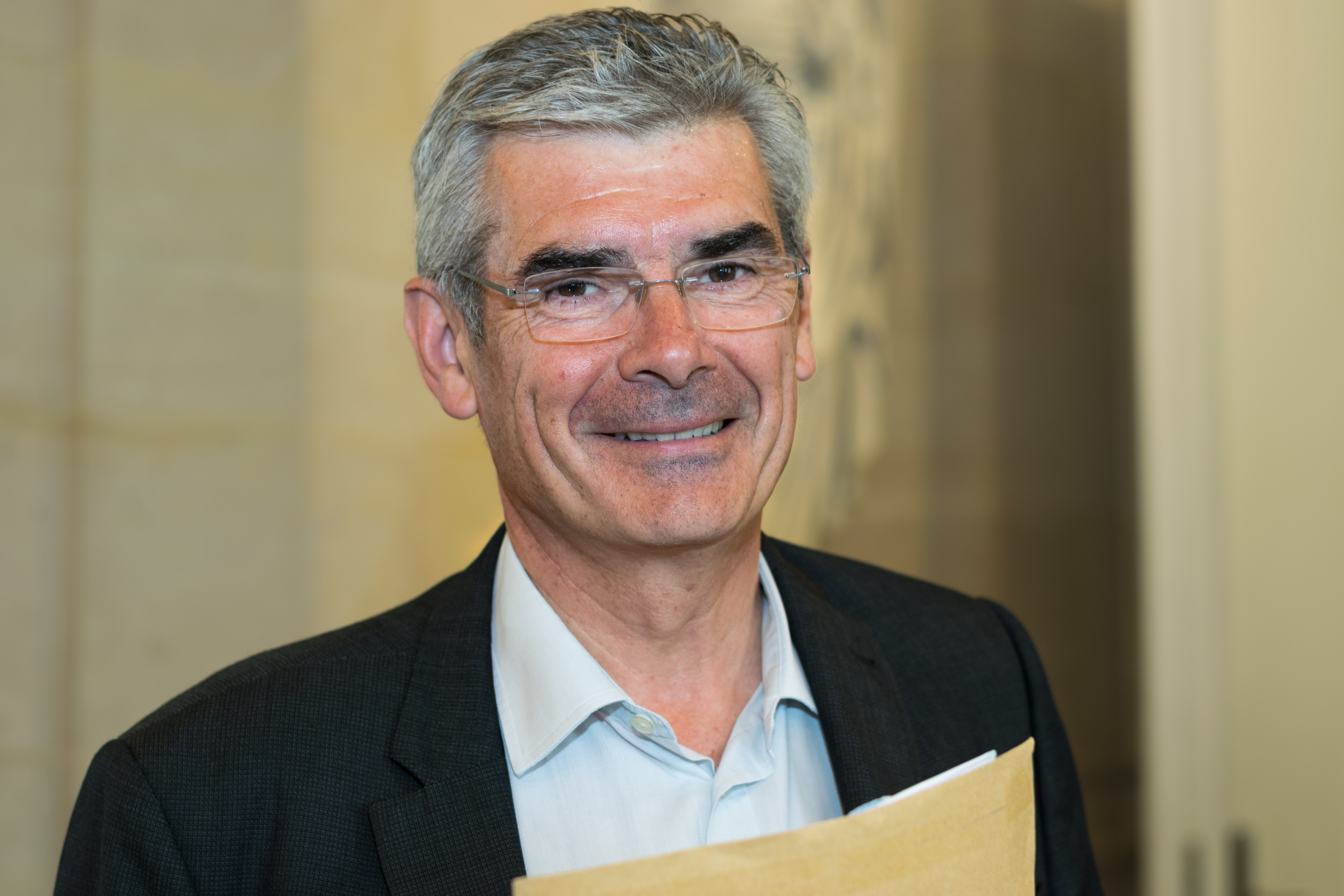
- Jean-Charles Taugourdeau in 2017

Mayor of Beaufort-en-Anjou
- Incumbent
- Assumed office 3 July 2020
- Preceded by: Serge Maye

Member of the National Assembly for Maine-et-Loire's 3rd constituency
- In office 19 June 2002 – 31 July 2020
- Preceded by: Christian Martin
- Succeeded by: Élisabeth Marquet; Anne-Laure Blin

Personal details
- Born: 17 July 1953 (age 71); Dreux, France
- Political party: The Republicans

Jean-Charles Taugourdeau (born 17 July 1953 in Dreux) was a member of the National Assembly of France. He represented Maine-et-Loire's 3rd constituency from 2002 to 2020, as a member of the Republicans. He was succeeded as MP by Anne-Laure Blin.
