= Montreuil-sur-Loir =

- Commune
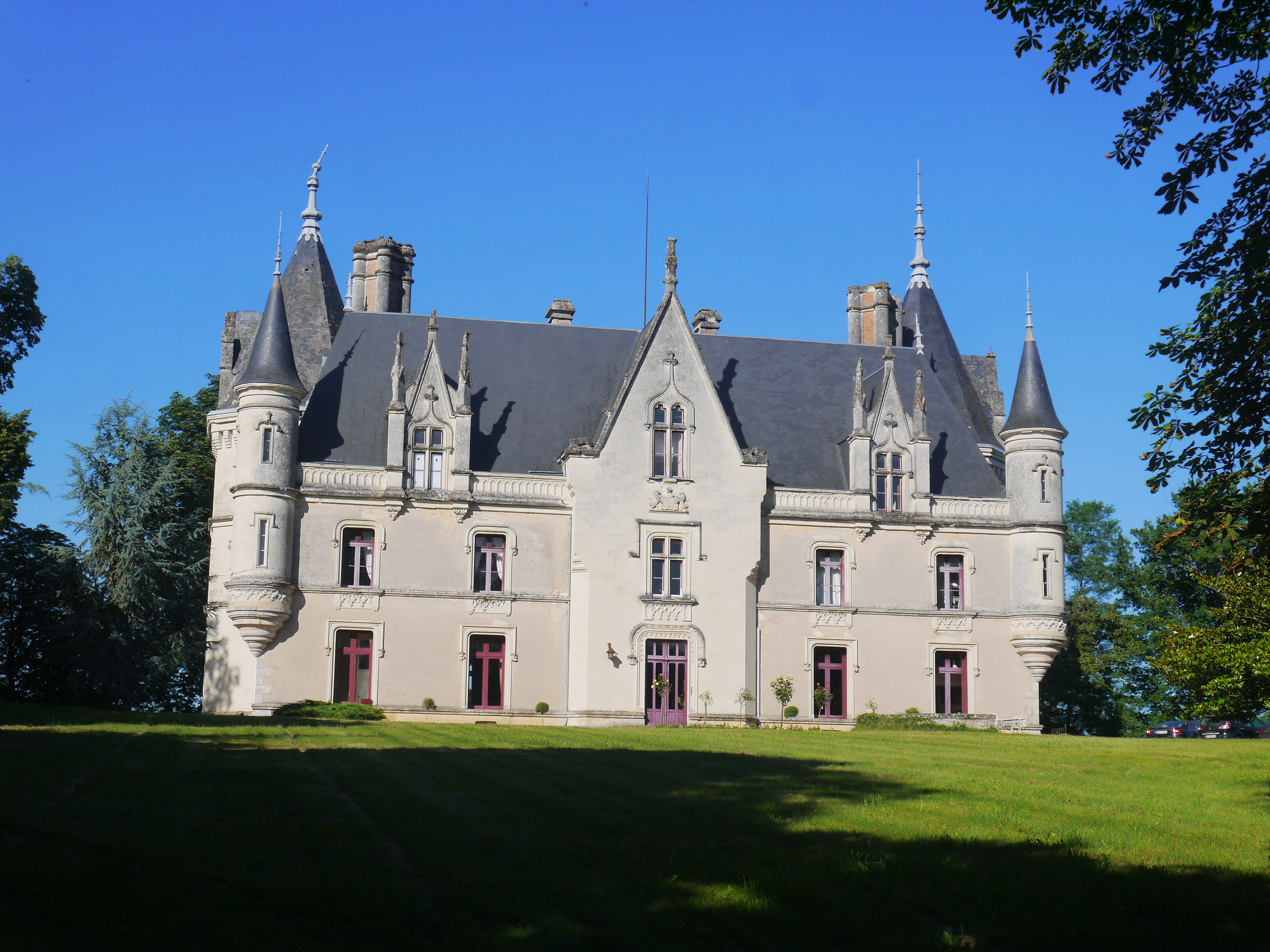
- The chateau of Montreuil-sur-Loir
- Location of Montreuil-sur-Loir
- Location within France Location within Pays de la Loire
- Coordinates: 47°36′31″N 0°24′11″W
- Country: France
- Region: Pays de la Loire
- Department: Maine-et-Loire
- Arrondissement: Angers
- Canton: Angers-6

Government
  - Mayor (2020–2026): Philippe Cardot
- Area^{1}: 11.99 km^{2} (4.63 sq mi)
- Highest elevation: 54 m (177 ft)
- Lowest elevation: 15 m (49 ft)
- Population (2023): 572
  - Density: 47.7/km^{2} (124/sq mi)
- Demonym(s): Monsteriolais, Monsteriolaise
- Time zone: UTC+01:00 (CET)
  - Summer (DST): UTC+02:00 (CEST)
- INSEE/Postal code: 49216 /49140
- ^{1} French Land Register data, which excludes lakes, ponds, glaciers > 1 km^{2} (0.386 sq mi or 247 acres) and river estuaries.

Montreuil-sur-Loir (French pronunciation: [mɔ̃tʁœj syʁ lwaʁ], literally Montreuil on Loir) is a commune in the Maine-et-Loire department in western France.

== See also ==
- Communes of the Maine-et-Loire department
