= Rives-du-Loir-en-Anjou =

- Commune
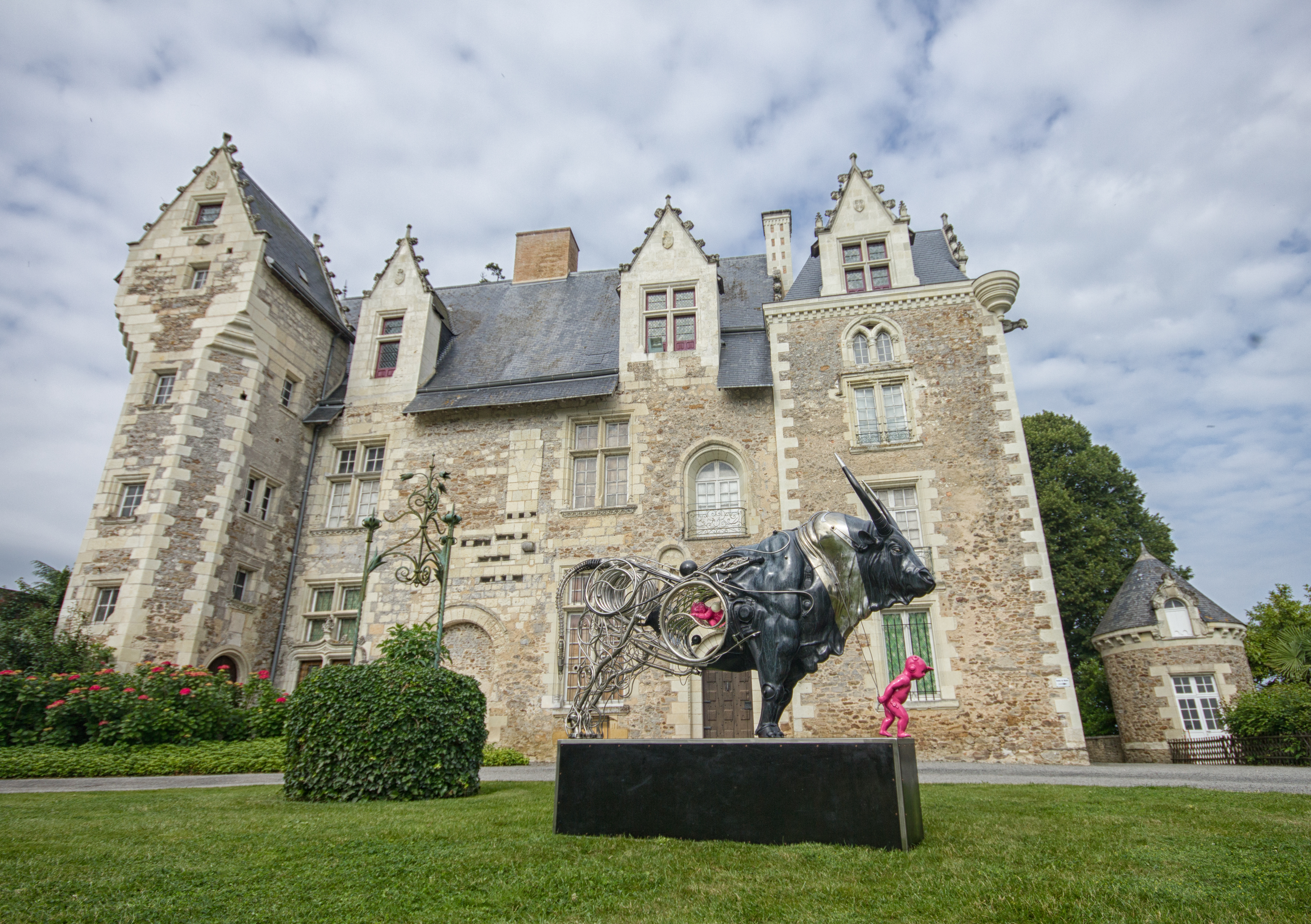
- The Château of Villevêque
- Location of Rives-du-Loir-en-Anjou
- Location within France Location within Pays de la Loire
- Coordinates: 47°33′40″N 0°25′19″W
- Country: France
- Region: Pays de la Loire
- Department: Maine-et-Loire
- Arrondissement: Angers
- Canton: Angers-6
- Intercommunality: CU Angers Loire Métropole

Government
  - Mayor (2020–2026): Éric Godin
- Area^{1}: 47.23 km^{2} (18.24 sq mi)
- Highest elevation: 60 m (200 ft)
- Lowest elevation: 12 m (39 ft)
- Population (2023): 5,644
  - Density: 119.5/km^{2} (309.5/sq mi)
- Time zone: UTC+01:00 (CET)
  - Summer (DST): UTC+02:00 (CEST)
- INSEE/Postal code: 49377 /49140
- ^{1} French Land Register data, which excludes lakes, ponds, glaciers > 1 km^{2} (0.386 sq mi or 247 acres) and river estuaries.

Rives-du-Loir-en-Anjou (French pronunciation: [ʁiv dy lwaʁ ɑ̃.n‿ɑ̃ʒu], literally Banks of the Loir in Anjou) is a commune in the Maine-et-Loire department in western France. It was established on 1 January 2019 by merger of the former communes of Villevêque (the seat) and Soucelles.

== Population ==
The population data given in the table below refer to the commune in its geography as of January 2025.

Historical population
Year	Pop.	±% p.a.
1968	1,989	—
1975	2,607	+3.94%
1982	3,555	+4.53%
1990	4,174	+2.03%
1999	4,465	+0.75%
2007	5,234	+2.01%
2012	5,467	+0.87%
2017	5,560	+0.34%
2023	5,644	+0.25%
Source: INSEE

== See also ==
- Communes of the Maine-et-Loire department
