= Villevêque =

- Part of Rives-du-Loir-en-Anjou
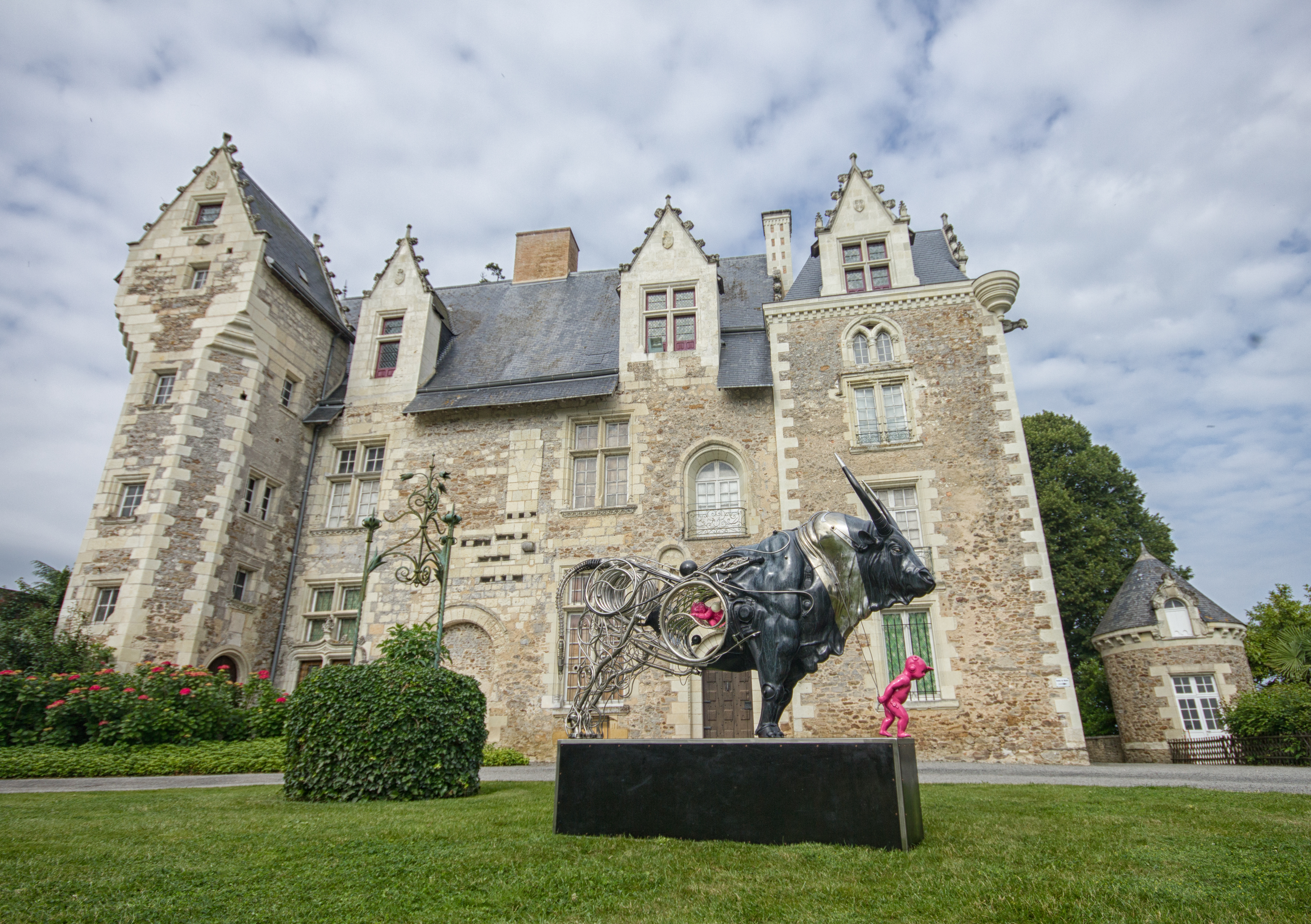
- The Château of Villevêque
- Location of Villevêque
- Location within France Location within Pays de la Loire
- Coordinates: 47°33′40″N 0°25′19″W
- Country: France
- Region: Pays de la Loire
- Department: Maine-et-Loire
- Arrondissement: Angers
- Canton: Angers-6
- Commune: Rives-du-Loir-en-Anjou
- Area^{1}: 28.03 km^{2} (10.82 sq mi)
- Elevation: 22 m (72 ft)
- Highest elevation: 51 m (167 ft)
- Lowest elevation: 14 m (46 ft)
- Population (2022): 3,028
  - Density: 108.0/km^{2} (279.8/sq mi)
- Time zone: UTC+01:00 (CET)
  - Summer (DST): UTC+02:00 (CEST)
- Postal code: 49140
- ^{1} French Land Register data, which excludes lakes, ponds, glaciers > 1 km^{2} (0.386 sq mi or 247 acres) and river estuaries.

Villevêque (French pronunciation: [vilvɛk]) is a former commune in the Maine-et-Loire department in western France. On 1 January 2019, it was merged into the new commune Rives-du-Loir-en-Anjou.

== See also ==
- Communes of the Maine-et-Loire department
