= Anne-Laure Blin =

French politician (born 1983)

Member of the National Assembly for Maine-et-Loire's 3rd constituency
- Incumbent
- Assumed office 28 September 2020
- Preceded by: Jean-Charles Taugourdeau

Personal details
- Born: 12 June 1983 (age 42) Toul, France
- Party: The Republicans
- Profession: Parliamentary assistant

Anne-Laure Blin (born 12 June 1983) is a French Republican politician who has been Member of Parliament for Maine-et-Loire's 3rd constituency since the 2020 by-election.

== Political career ==
Ahead of the Republicans' 2022 convention, Blin endorsed Éric Ciotti as the party's chairman.

== Electoral record ==
2020 by-election: Maine-et-Loire's 3rd constituency
| Party | Candidate | Votes | % | ±% |
|---|---|---|---|---|
| LR | Anne-Laure Blin | 3,113 | 25.24 | −1.93 |
| EELV | Daphnée Raveneau | 2,810 | 22.78 | +18.35 |
| DVD | Adrien Denis | 2,497 | 20.24 | N/A |
| DVD | Guy Bertin | 2,276 | 18.45 | N/A |
| RN | Patrice Lancien | 1,206 | 9.78 | −2.71 |
| Far left | Patricia Peillon | 260 | 2.11 | N/A |
| Others | N/A | 174 | | |
| Turnout | | 12,667 | 17.84 | −31.57 |
2nd round result
| LR | Anne-Laure Blin | 7,329 | 61.14 | +9.26 |
| EELV | Daphnée Raveneau | 4,658 | 38.86 | N/A |
| Turnout | | 12,609 | 17.75 | −23.08 |
| LR hold | | | | |
