= Glyn Gilbert =

British Army general (1920–2003)

Major-General Glyn Gilbert CB MC
- Born: 15 August 1920
- Died: 26 September 2003 (aged 83)
- Military career
- Allegiance: United Kingdom
- Branch: British Army
- Service years: 1939–1974
- Rank: Major-General
- Service number: 108156
- Commands: 44th Parachute Brigade; 3rd Division
- Conflicts: Second World War
- Awards: Companion of the Order of the Bath; Military Cross

Major-General Glyn Charles Anglim Gilbert CB MC (15 August 1920 – 26 September 2003) was a 20th-century British military officer who saw active service during the Second World War. In 1970, he became the highest ranking Bermudian military officer when he was promoted to the rank of major-general in the British Army.

== Early life ==
Gilbert was born into a family with its roots in the 17th century settlement of Bermuda, where the family is based mostly in Paget and Warwick parishes. A Thomas Gilbert of Warwick gifted the land upon which Christ Church in Warwick, the oldest Presbyterian church outside of the British Isles, was built in 1719 (Glyn Charles Anglim Gilbert's parents, however, belonged to the St. Paul's Church (Church of England) in Paget). His father, Major Charles Gray Gosling Gilbert, OBE, MC, was the long-time head of the Colony's education department (1924–1956) (the school of Gilbert Institute, in Paget, opened on 26 May 1933, is named for him). Charles Gilbert, a Bermuda Rhodes Scholar from 1913, had been studying at Brasenose College, Oxford, in England when the Great War began. He left the university and was commissioned into the Royal West Kent Regiment, before serving on the Western Front in the Machine Gun Corps. Other Bermudian students in Britain similarly left their studies to serve in the British Army, including another Bermudian Rhodes Scholar at Oxford, Lennock de Graaf Godet, killed in action while serving in the Royal Flying Corps. During the Second World War, Gilbert was also in charge of cable censorship in Bermuda.

Glyn Gilbert was born in England, where his father worked briefly after leaving the Army following the end of the Great War. Raised in Bermuda, he was sent to Eastbourne College in England. After leaving school the year before the start of the Second World War, and anticipating the coming conflict, Glyn Gilbert returned briefly to Bermuda before enrolling at the Royal Military College, Sandhurst. The 1939 class of officer cadets was hurried through its training, and Gilbert was commissioned into the Lincolnshire Regiment. Two contingents from the Bermuda Volunteer Rifle Corps had served with the Lincolnshire Regiment on the Western Front, during the Great War. Since the 1920s, the affiliation between the two units had been given official sanction, with the Lincolns taking a paternal relationship towards the BVRC, akin to that it had with its own Territorial battalions. The BVRC would send drafts to the Lincolns again, in 1940 and 1944.

== Service in Second World War ==
In 1944, Major Gilbert, as Officer Commanding "C" Company, 2nd Lincolns, was one of only two Bermudians to land on the beaches of Normandy. He later earned the immediate award of the Military Cross in the crossing of the Escaut Canal, part of a larger operation to cross the Rhine. He, and another company commander involved, was decorated with the medal by Field Marshal Bernard Montgomery, personally. As Gilbert put it, 'later that day [of the crossing], the ribbon was pinned on while we were still in the field. The next day we were relieved by a contingent of Bermudians', which included his cousin, Lieutenant Ambrose Gosling. The Bermudians were part of a draft of Lincolns sent from England, under the command of Bermudian Major Anthony Frith "Toby" Smith, who was killed in action shortly thereafter. Glyn ended the War in Northern Germany, where 2 Lincolns had taken part in the capture of Bremen. He was one of four Bermudians who served in the Lincolns during the War and who attained the rank of major while serving in the regiment (the others were Anthony Frith Smith, John Brownlow-Tucker, and Patrick Purcell). Another volunteer from the Bermuda Volunteer Rifle Corps, who transferred to the Lincolnshire Regiment in 1940, Lieutenant Bernard John Abbott, a school teacher who had originally been commissioned into the Bermuda Cadet Corps, would end the war as an honorary lieutenant-colonel.

== Post-war service ==
After the War, Gilbert was attached to the Third Battalion of the Parachute Regiment (3 Para), serving in Palestine. He moved through a number of subsequent postings, ultimately transferring permanently to the Parachute Regiment, of which in 1962 he was appointed Regimental Colonel. In that position, he was responsible for a number of significant changes, including the introduction of a battle training course for NCOs at Brecon, which was eventually made mandatory throughout the Infantry, and the creation of the Red Devils parachute display team. Following this command, he was promoted to brigadier general, in command of the Territorial Army's 44th Parachute Brigade. After attending the Imperial Defence College, Gilbert became commandant of the School of Infantry, Warminister, in 1967. While there, he entertained HM the Queen in his own home when she visited the school. He was promoted to major-general in 1970 and appointed General Officer Commanding 3rd Division before he retired from the Army in 1974. Gilbert was one of the umpires for the 1974 Sandhurst wargame on Operation Sea Lion.

Gilbert also played a pivotal role in the development of the Royal Bermuda Regiment, the Bermudian territorial unit formed in 1965 by amalgamating the BVRC (which had been renamed the Bermuda Rifles) with the Bermuda Militia Artillery. The original mandated strength of the Bermuda Regiment (which became a Royal regiment in 2015) was about 400, all ranks. Following discipline problems during an exercise in the West Indies, a report on the unit was commissioned from Major-General Gilbert, who also took into account the difficulties the regiment subsequently experienced in meeting its obligations when embodied during the civil unrest of 1977, when it had proven under-strength and had required regular army reinforcement. He made a number of recommendations, including the increase of the regiment's strength to a full battalion of about 750, with three rifle companies and a support company.

== Private life ==
In 1943, Gilbert married Heather Mary Jackson, and they had three sons, including Major Graham Gilbert, and one daughter.

In retirement, Gilbert continued to live at Heytesbury. A member of the Army and Navy Club, in Who's Who he stated his recreation as "following the sun". His wife died in 2000, and he himself died in 2003, at the age of 83.

== See also ==
- Military of Bermuda

Military offices
Preceded by Terence McMeekin	General Officer Commanding the 3rd Division; 1970–1972	Succeeded by Richard Worsley
