= Teddy Gueritz =

Royal Navy Rear-Admiral (1919–2008)

Rear-Admiral Teddy Gueritz CB OBE DSC*
- Born: 8 September 1919
- Died: 21 December 2008 (aged 89)
- Military career
- Allegiance: United Kingdom
- Branch: Royal Navy
- Service years: 1937–1973
- Rank: Rear-Admiral
- Nickname: Teddy
- Commands: Royal Naval College, Greenwich; Joint Warfare Establishment
- Conflicts: Second World War
- Awards: Companion of the Order of the Bath; Officer of the Order of the British Empire; Distinguished Service Cross & Bar

Rear-Admiral Edward Findlay "Teddy" Gueritz, CB, OBE, DSC* (8 September 1919 – 21 December 2008) was a long-serving Royal Navy officer. From D-Day, 6 June 1944, he served as beachmaster on Sword, organising the flow of men and materiel into the beachhead, including 30,000 troops on the first day. 19 days later he was severely wounded and evacuated to the United Kingdom where he required life-saving surgery. He had previously served in a similar role during Operation Ironclad, which captured Madagascar in 1942. He retired from the navy in 1973, and became an academic and author.

== Early life and family ==
Gueritz was born on 8 September 1919. He was educated at Cheltenham College, Gloucestershire, entering as an exhibitioner in 1933.

He was the son of Elton Laurence Gueritz, an officer of the Colonial Service and Eleanor Dixon Valentine Gueritz (née Findlay). He had three siblings, an elder brother and two older sisters. His brother, John Elton Fortescue Gueritz (born 1911), was an officer of the British Indian Army, subsequently working for the British Council in Tehran, and later became Secretary of the St. John Ambulance Association in the United Kingdom. His sister Lucy Valentine Gueritz (born 1915) married an Indian Army officer, Henry Gerard Burton. His other sister, Eleanor Elton Gueritz (born 1916) served in the Auxiliary Territorial Service during the Second World War and married another Indian Army officer, William Richard Feaver.

== Military career ==
On leaving school he joined the Royal Navy as a special entry cadet in 1937. He was appointed to HMS Ramillies on 13 April 1938, and promoted to midshipman on 26 April 1938 (with seniority from 1 May).

=== Second World War ===
Soon after the outbreak of the Second World War, he was a midshipman on the cruiser HMS Cumberland. The ship was refitting in the Falkland Islands at the start of the Battle of the River Plate but hurriedly rejoined the squadron commanded by Commodore Henry Harwood. The subsequent blockade resulted in the scuttling of the Admiral Graf Spee.

On 6 June 1944, Gueritz went ashore on Sword at 08:00 as the third most senior member of the beachmaster party. His immediate superior, Commander Rowley Nichols was badly wounded, and the army liaison officer Lieutenant-Colonel D V H Board was killed almost immediately. This left Gueritz alone with the task of marshalling all the troops coming ashore, organising the landing craft and maintaining contact with the naval forces offshore. He was wearing a blue-painted helmet and a red scarf, and his sole weapon was a blackthorn walking stick.

Gueritz's immediate task was to solve the problem of vehicles becoming stuck in the soft sand, and to start getting men through the exits being cleared through the minefields and barbed wire by flail tanks. To add to his problems, a further brigade came ashore at 0930, only to find that high winds were driving the tide higher than expected, reducing the space available on the beach and pushing the landing craft on to the explosive obstacles left by the Germans. Despite all this by the evening of D-Day 30,000 troops, hundreds of vehicles and tons of ammunition and other supplies had been landed and moved through the beach area.

Gueritz continued his work for 19 days; then, just after he had put his helmet back on, he was struck in the head by a shell fragment. Initially the seriousness of his wound was not realised, and it was only when he collapsed while he was being treated for a minor hand injury that doctors discovered that the back of his skull had been crushed. Evacuated to the United Kingdom, he was operated on at Southampton General Hospital. John Richardson, the surgeon who saved Gueritz's life, later became president of the General Medical Council and was created a life peer.

=== Post Second World War ===
After the war Gueritz became second-in-command of HMS Saumarez, and it was due to the damage control procedures that he put in place that the ship was not lost during the Corfu Channel Incident in 1946. He was promoted to lieutenant commander on 16 April 1949, and to commander on 31 December 1953. He served on the staff of General Sir Hugh Stockwell during the Suez Crisis of 1956. Within the seaman specialism, he was promoted to captain on 30 June 1959 on appointment as Deputy Director of the Royal Naval Staff College. He joined the Naval Staff at the Admiralty in 1961, attended Imperial Defence College in 1964 and became Captain of the Fleet for the Far East Fleet in 1965. He went on to be Director of Defence Plans (Navy) in 1967, Director of the Joint Warfare Staff at the Ministry of Defence in 1968 and President of the Royal Naval College, Greenwich in 1968. His last appointment was as Commandant of the Joint Warfare Establishment in 1970 before he retired on 15 January 1973.

== Later life ==
Gueritz held a number of positions at the Royal United Services Institute. In the 1970s he also participated in an Anglo-German exercise which wargaming the plans for Operation Sea Lion, the proposed German invasion of the United Kingdom during the Second World War. He also set questions for the TV quiz programme, Mastermind. From 1976 to 1979, he was editor of the RUSI Journal and from 1980 to 1981 was editor-in-chief. From 1980 to 1981, he was director of the institute.

He was a long-serving president of the Society for Nautical Research (1974–1991).

== Honours and decorations ==
On 25 August 1942, Gueritz was awarded the Distinguished Service Cross "for bravery and enterprise while serving in H.M. Ships, Transports and Royal Fleet Auxiliaries in the successful operations which led to the surrender of the important base of Diego Suarez". On 29 August 1944, he was awarded a Bar to his Distinguished Service Cross "for gallantry, skill, determination and undaunted devotion to duty during the initial landings of Allied Forces on the coast of Normandy".

In the 1957 Queen's Birthday Honours, he was appointed Officer of the Order of the British Empire "in recognition of distinguished services in the Operations in the Near East, October to December 1956". In the 1971 Queen's Birthday Honours, he was appointed Companion of the Order of the Bath (CB).

== Sources ==
- "Rear-Admiral Teddy Gueritz—D-Day beachmaster who cleared the way for 30,000 troops and endured 19 days under fire". The Daily Telegraph. 7 January 2009.
- "Rear-Admiral Edward Gueritz: Naval officer and Mastermind question-setter". The Times. 20 January 2009.

Military offices
Preceded by Sir Horace Lyddon	President, Royal Naval College, Greenwich; 1968–1970	Succeeded by Martin Lucey
