= Operation Sea Lion (wargame) =

Simulation of a Nazi invasion of the UK

Operation Sea Lion was a major wargame conducted at Royal Military Academy Sandhurst in 1974. Its aim was to find out what might have happened had Nazi Germany launched Operation Sea Lion, their planned invasion of southeast England during World War II, in September 1940. The wargame was organised by The Daily Telegraph and Dr Paddy Griffith from the Department of War Studies at Sandhurst. The British umpires were Air Chief Marshal Christopher Foxley-Norris, Rear Admiral Teddy Gueritz and Major General Glyn Gilbert. The German umpires were General Adolf Galland (air), Admiral Friedrich Ruge (naval) and General Heinrich Trettner (land). After the game's conclusion, all the umpires unanimously concluded that the invasion was a devastating defeat for the German invasion force.

== Players ==
There were two teams of four players each (Land, Sea, Air, Political):

German:
Rudolf Rothenfelder, President of the Fighter Pilots Association in Munich and ex-Luftwaffe officer played Luftwaffe chief Hermann Goering; Professor Rohwer, Director of the Military Institute in Stuttgart, played Adm. Erich Raeder; and Field Marshal Walther von Brauchitsch was played by Colonel Karl-Heinz Wachsmuth, the Bundeswehr liaison officer at the Staff College who had been a Wehrmacht officer on the Eastern front and in France and Italy during World War II. The German players were supported by their Defence Attaché in London, Admiral Schuenemann.

British:
British Prime Minister Winston Churchill was played by Brigadier Page, Assistant Commandant of the RMA Sandhurst. The people who played the British Home Forces Commander-in-Chief, General Sir Alan Brooke, and the First Lord of the Admiralty, Dudley Pound, are not recorded.

The game had a total of 30 participants.

== Game preparation and methodology ==
There was "a computerised 'Battle of Britain' phase (the computer filled a whole large room...)" prior to the start of the game, simulating a continuation of the Luftwaffe assault against RAF airbases in Kent and Sussex; and predicting both the actual extent of British and German aircraft losses, and the (vastly inflated) claimed air victories being reported by German pilots in intelligence reports to the German commanders. Consequently, the German side started with the erroneous intelligence that continued RAF resistance over the South East had only been achieved through stripping fighter units from the rest of the country, and hence that achieving German air superiority was a realistic prospect, sufficient to justify seizing the opportunity offered by likely last fair weather of autumn 1940. By this device, the game designers were able to justify the counterfactual of Sea Lion being launched, even though actual air superiority had not been achieved. The computerised "Battle of Britain" preliminaries (programmed by Ivan Collier) lasted several days before the main event. Umpires were allowed to make decisions based on their own intuition (like game masters in a role-playing game) and not in the way wargames are usually played. Preparation involved giving each player a written brief telling them what was known, what was expected of them and how they should behave in the game. Paddy Griffith was the "Grand High Umpire". There were six other "umpires of first recourse": two for land, and one each for railways, sea, air and political. These were: Andy Callan, John Davis, Michael Orr, Dennis Barr, Nigel de Lee and Tony Thomas. They "took 'orders' from the playing teams, and usually fed back routine 'reports' locally, without referring them upwards for higher adjudication by the prestigious team of eight international generals and admirals. That happened only when contentious or controversial issues arose that the 'prestigious team' could constructively debate."

== Scenario ==
The game was played using a scale model of southeast England, the English Channel, and northern France. Available troops and resources were based on known plans from both sides, and weather conditions were based on contemporary British Admiralty records that had, until then, never been published. The two actual days of the Game were scheduled to cover up to a week of ‘war’, long enough for the outcome to be evident. The game started on 19 September 1940. It ran for 16 hours straight, over a weekend.

== Assumptions ==
The scenario assumed:

- The German military had taken until September to assemble the shipping necessary for a Channel crossing.
- The Luftwaffe continued to attack British airfields after 7 September 1940 instead of bombing London during the day, despite the fact that the continuous attacks leading up to September 19 had not yet established air supremacy; albeit their intelligence assessments had proposed that the RAF was at breaking point.
- The Luftwaffe bombed London at night.
- The Germans had only converted river barges and tugs available as transport ships for the first echelon. Not a great deal was known about the invasion fleet at the time of the wargame. This represented a simplification relative to shipping plans discovered later, which involved nearly 4,000 vessels, including 150 merchant ships and 237 light or auxiliary close escorts in four invasion fleets. In the contemporary shipping plans drawn up by the Kriegsmarine, the second and third echelons of the first wave—consisting of artillery, vehicles, heavy equipment, stores, horses and reserves of personnel—were proposed as crossing the Channel at the same time as the first echelon, but then standing offshore to be landed on the second and third days. For the game, these plans were altered (in accordance with the known arguments of the Army commanders at the time), so that these follow-up forces would be held back to cross on the night of S plus one; but then the merchant ships carrying these forces were intercepted at dawn on S plus two by a large force of Royal Navy cruisers and destroyers.
- The only ships available to defend the invasion fleet were some U-boats, E-boats and destroyers.
- The invasion fleet was largely unmolested in the crossing, as the Royal Navy ships had to steam south from their bases as far away as Scotland to reach the invasion beaches.
- The bombing of London would destroy railways between East Anglia and the invasion beaches in Kent and Sussex, so that British troops could not be redeployed quickly. This actually happened on 7 September 1940, when all the railways running south from London were cut and took a long time to repair due to the use (for the first time) of delayed action time bombs.
- Operation Herbstreise was enlarged to make 10,000 men available for a landing in East Anglia, northern England, Scotland, or Iceland (in real life there were three divisions of infantry involved).
- The Channel Guns had no effect.
- The Home Fleet would send its capital ships south.

== The first two days ==
The game started on 19 September 1940, but the Germans decided that the sea was too rough to attempt a landing. The same happened the next day. The first two days of game time, therefore, consisted of air battles, movement of British units to the south coast, the launching of Operation Herbstreise, and embarkation of German units at the French Channel ports. The Luftwaffe bombed Britain's south coast and laid mines in the Harwich, Humber and Thames estuary waters. The Germans landed their Herbstreise diversion force in Iceland and laid protective minefields in the Channel, but "Churchill" refused to divert any troops in response to the Iceland invasion. Paddy Griffith was very disappointed with the huge wargame map, which included only the English coast between Portsmouth and Ipswich. Griffith said the map, on which he was not consulted, was unnecessary. "On the day of the game its mere existence had the instant, deeply unfortunate effect of revealing to the British team that the invasion would certainly land in Kent, rather than in East Anglia, or wherever else the umpire team had been trying hard to make the German's deception plan sound convincing." However, in 1940 the British might well have had this level of knowledge due to their top-secret Ultra code breaking efforts against the Germans, which had not yet been made public at the time of the 1974 wargame. In any event, the 1974 British wargame team took full advantage of their intelligence coup and the two day delay by moving four more divisions to Saffron Walden, Newbury, Crowborough and Royal Tunbridge Wells to bolster the nine already in East Anglia, Kent and Sussex.

On the afternoon of September 21, the wind dropped, and the forecast for the next day improved. The German protective minefields were finished, stretching out from the North Foreland. The first echelon invasion fleets began to form up at dusk, and begin to cross. They were spotted by a British armed trawler at 11 p.m. The Cromwell warning was issued half an hour later (and the church bells rung), and at midnight the Home Fleet was ordered south.

== Invasion ==
The German first echelon attack was launched at dawn on 22 September 1940 and consisted of 8,000 airborne troops and 80,000 infantry landing in amphibious operations. The German invasion fleet only suffered minor losses due to motor torpedo boats, however, about 25% of the barges used for the first echelon were lost after being destroyed on the beaches. During this 24-hour period, the Royal Air Force lost 237 aircraft (about 23% of its fighting strength) whilst the Luftwaffe's losses amounted to 333, also about 23% of its aircraft. Naval engagements were indecisive at this stage as the Royal Navy was still assembling its main destroyer fleet to attack. A small force of destroyers, supported by the cruiser HMS Manchester (15), attempted to reach the invasion beaches from Portsmouth, but were easily sunk by the German destroyer and S-boat escorts. The larger ships of the Royal Navy's Home Fleet (including battleships, heavy cruisers and aircraft carriers) were not yet committed due to their vulnerability to air attack and U-boats.

The Germans managed to advance a dozen or so miles inland and even captured the ports of Folkestone and Newhaven, but the docks at Folkestone had been thoroughly demolished by the British, rendering them more or less unusable. British and Commonwealth forces were moved to fully engage in the battle with the first counterattack on 23 September, halting the advance of the Germans towards Hastings and recapturing the western bank of Newhaven. German paratroops were also pinned down by long-range artillery directed onto the captured aerodrome at Lympne by stay-behind forces. At this stage, the Germans had few tanks (including amphibious tanks) and only light artillery ashore. An increasing shortage of ammunition was slowly forcing them back towards the sea. The Germans asked "Hitler" if the night time bombing of London could stop and the aircraft be used to support the invasion. The request was denied. By dusk on 23 September, the Germans had 10 divisions ashore, but most were halted by counterattacks, and were awaiting the remainder of their equipment, stores and personnel (critically including tanks and heavy artillery) on the second and third echelons.

The decision to dispatch the second and third echelon shipping of the German invasion was held back in hopes that a possible capture of either Dover or Newhaven could be achieved. When the orders were finally issued on the evening of 23 September, they were only issued for fleets sailing from Calais and Dunkirk to the beaches in Kent; there would be no follow-up support from Le Havre to the forces ashore in Sussex as there was insufficient aircover and naval defence. At dawn on 24 September, the follow-up echelons of German invasion ships and barges were intercepted 9 miles (14 km) miles short of their beach objectives by a Royal Navy fleet of 17 cruisers, 57 destroyers and motor torpedo boats. Sixty-five per cent of the German barges, three German destroyers and seven E-boats were sunk for the loss of only two British destroyers (sunk by U-boats) plus two cruisers and four destroyers damaged. Some of the transport ships broke away and headed for Folkestone, but the port was so badly damaged they could only unload two at a time. With the Royal Navy suffering only minor losses, the Home Fleet was ordered to stand by to sail for the English Channel. The German divisions ashore only had enough ammunition for two to seven more days of fighting. Fast steamers and ferries were pressed into service to start an evacuation of German troops from Folkestone and Rye. "Hitler" ordered the remaining reserves to stand down and prepare for redeployment to Poland. Further British air and sea attacks disrupted the German evacuation over the subsequent four days. The remaining German troops in England finally surrendered on 28 September.

== Conclusion ==
Although the first echelon landings were more successful than had been anticipated, the German navy's relative weakness, combined with the Luftwaffe's lack of air supremacy, meant they were not able to prevent the Royal Navy from intercepting the second and third echelon Channel crossings. The RN's destruction of the follow-up echelon forces prevented resupply and reinforcement of the landed troops. This made the position of the initially successful invasion force untenable; it suffered further casualties during the attempted evacuation. Of the 90,000 German troops who landed, only 15,400 returned to France; 33,000 were taken prisoner, 26,000 were killed in the fighting and 15,000 drowned in the English Channel. All six umpires deemed the invasion a resounding failure.
