= Horace Lyddon =

Vice-Admiral Sir Horace Lyddon KBE CB
- Born: Horace Collier Lyddon; 28 September 1912; Plymouth, Devon, England
- Died: 9 June 1968 (aged 55); Gosport, Hampshire, England
- Military career
- Allegiance: United Kingdom
- Branch: Royal Navy
- Service years: 1930–1968
- Rank: Vice-Admiral
- Nickname: Bertie
- Commands: HMS Phoenicia; Royal Naval College, Greenwich
- Conflicts: World War II
- Awards: Knight Commander of the Order of the British Empire; Companion of the Order of the Bath

Vice-Admiral Sir Horace Collier Lyddon KBE CB (28 September 1912 – 9 June 1968) was a Royal Navy officer who became President of the Royal Naval College, Greenwich.

== Naval career ==
Lyddon joined the Royal Navy in 1930 and served in World War II as Deputy Secretary to the Commander-in-Chief, Eastern Fleet from 1942 until 1944 when he became Secretary to the Commander, 5th Cruiser Squadron. He became Secretary to the Second-in-Command Mediterranean Fleet in 1949, naval secretary in Washington, D.C. in 1950 and secretary to the Commander-in-Chief, The Nore in 1952. He went on to be Executive Assistant to the Deputy Supreme Allied Commander Atlantic in 1954, Commanding Officer of the shore establishment HMS Phoenicia in 1958 and Director of Service Conditions at the British Admiralty in 1960. After that he became Rear Admiral (Personnel) at Naval Air Command in 1962, and Director General of Naval Manpower in 1964. Promoted to vice admiral on 9 February 1966, he served as President of the Royal Naval College, Greenwich from 1967 until his death in 1968.

== Rugby union ==
Lyddon was also an accomplished rugby player. He played for Barbarian F.C., Navy, Devon, and Hampshire before the Second World War, and captained Hampshire and United Services Portsmouth teams in 1939. Lyddon served as president of the Royal Navy Rugby Union in 1967 and also served as naval member of the Rugby Football Union.

Military offices
Preceded by Patrick Bayly	President, Royal Naval College, Greenwich; 1967–1968	Succeeded by Edward Gueritz
