= Seilbomb =

German secret weapon in World War II

A Seilbombe (German pronunciation: [ˈzaɪlbɔmbə], plural Seilbomben, [ˈzaɪlbɔmbən]), literally "rope bomb", was a secret German weapon developed during the Second World War designed to disable the electrical power grid of an invaded territory. Equipped with it, a German Messerschmitt Bf 110 fighter plane or an Arado 196 float plane would fly low at night over areas near enemy power plants or urban centers where power lines were located and would use it to cause local blackouts. This would, it was hoped, lead to civilian panic and the inability of local opposing forces to coordinate a defense. The piloting of planes so equipped was extremely dangerous, as it required the pilot to fly his plane almost directly at enemy power lines in the dark when visibility was already severely limited and within easy range of anti-aircraft fire.

== Operation ==
The Seilbombe device was a box-like frame attached to the belly of a plane with a roll of strong, detachable 21-to-24-metre-long (70 to 80 ft) cables connected in series and attached to a set of pulleys, each cable having a small weight attached to one end. The fighter pilot would fly his craft low over sections of the electrical grid while trailing the cable beneath and behind it. When one cable wrapped around an electricity cable, it broke off, short-circuiting that cable. The Bordfunker ("radio operator") of the plane would then use a control box to reel out the next length of cable, and the Bf 110 would continue to the next section of the grid.

== Implementation ==
Seilbomben saw little actual use by German forces. They were considered for the planned attack on Moscow during Operation Barbarossa, where assaulting the city's power plants appeared to some German commanders to be a more useful tool for subjugating the city than outright terror (the Russian populace was considered too obstinate for the latter to be effective). They were also considered but never implemented for the planned invasion of England, Operation Sea Lion.

== See also ==
- Electromagnetic pulse (EMP)
- Operation Outward
- Graphite bomb
