= Graphite bomb =

Weapon used to disable power grids

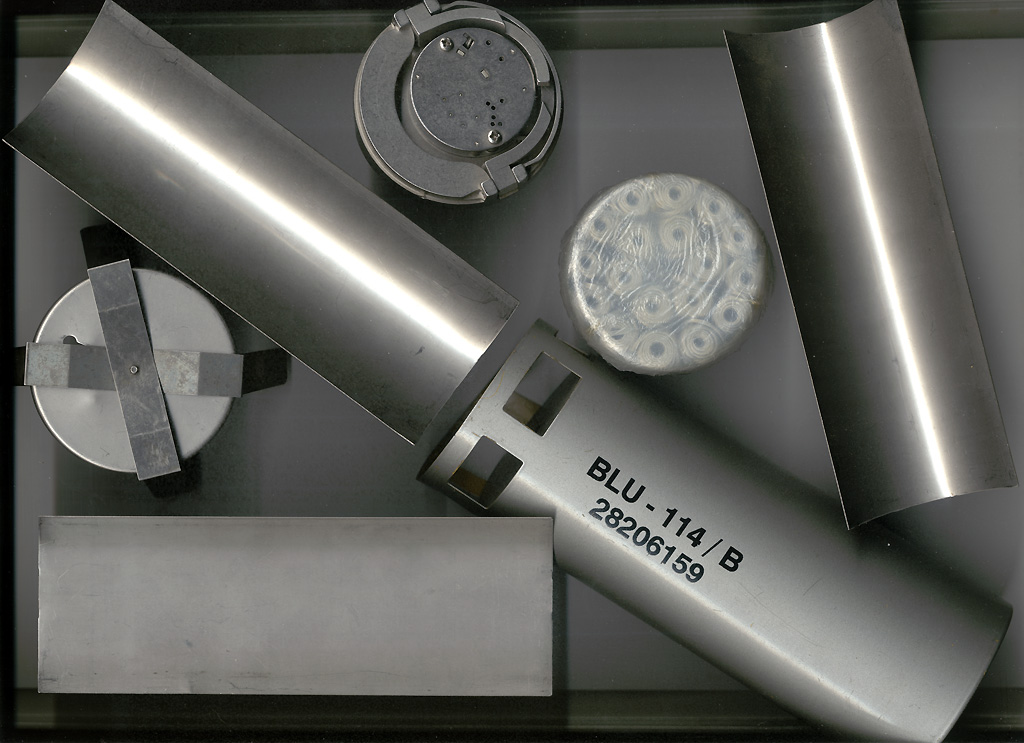
Graphite bomb BLU-114/B.

A graphite bomb is intended to be a non-lethal weapon used to disable an electrical grid. The bomb works by spreading a dense cloud of extremely fine, chemically treated carbon filaments over air-insulated high voltage installations like transformers and power lines, causing short-circuits and subsequent disruption of the electricity supply in an area, a region or even an entire small country. The weapon is sometimes referred to as a blackout bomb or soft bomb because its direct effects are largely confined to the targeted electrical power facility, with minimal risk of immediate collateral damage.

== Working principle ==
Graphite bombs usually consist of a metal canister that is filled with spools of graphite filament and an explosive device. Graphite is a sufficiently good conductor and the current flowing in the fiber immediately vaporizes it, creating a thin channel of gas, ionized by the high temperature, around the space previously occupied by the fiber. The ionized gas, also a conductor, allows more current to flow, raising the temperature further and creating a bigger channel of ionized gas until the high voltage line is effectively short circuited. At this point either the protection of the line cuts the power, or the line fails due to overcurrent. In both cases the power distribution is cut.

=== Indirect impact ===
As water supply systems and sewage treatment systems depend on electricity, widespread outbreaks of cholera and other waterborne diseases, causing large numbers of civilian deaths, have in the past been the indirect consequence of this bomb's use.

=== Countermeasures ===
The effects of a graphite bomb can be mitigated by providing insulation. However, most power lines are not insulated in practice due to the high costs involved.

== Development and use cases ==
=== United States ===
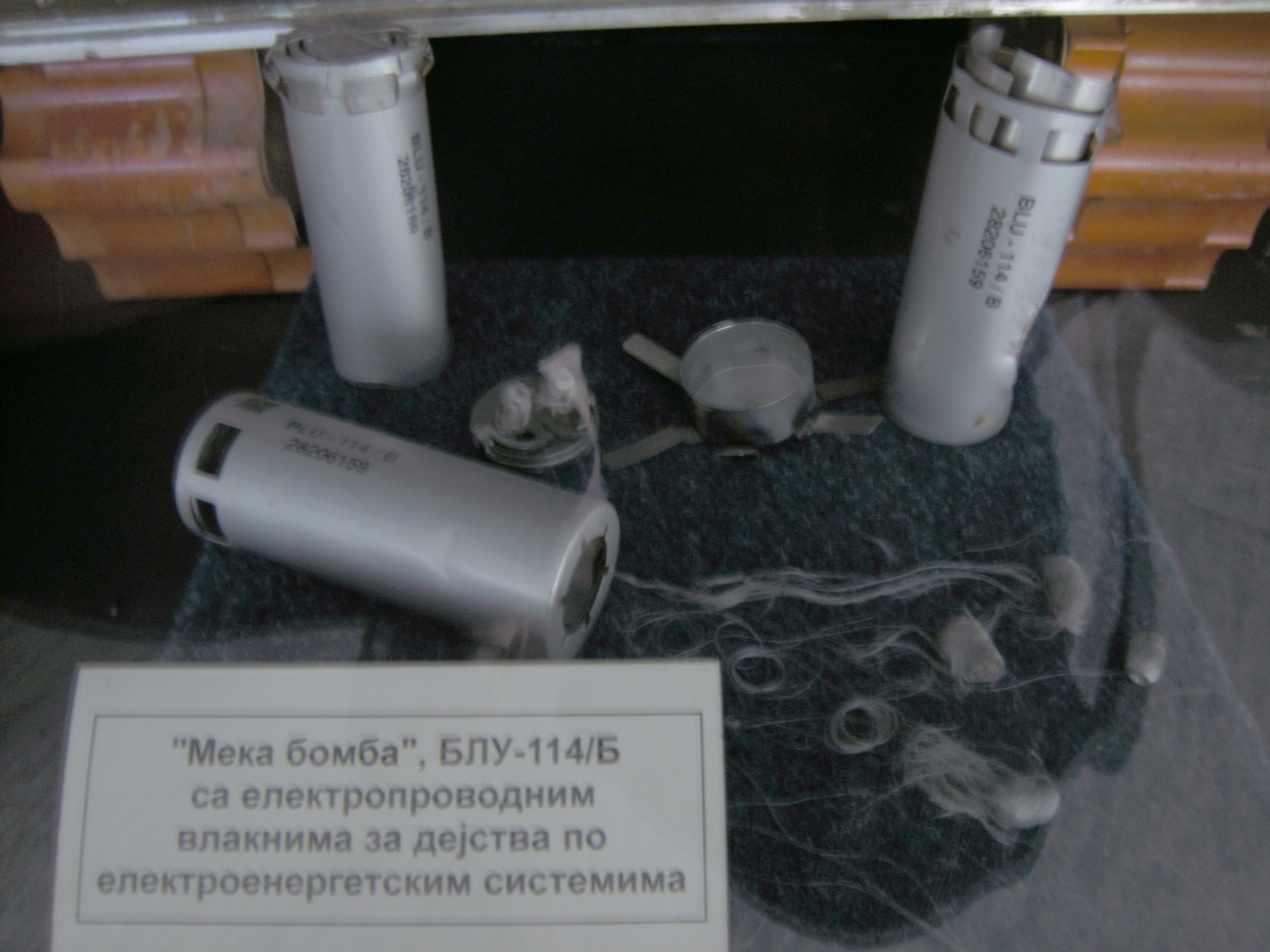
Recovered BLU-114/Bs with partially unwound reels in the Aeronautical Museum Belgrade, Serbia. Plaque reads: "Soft bomb", BLU-114/B with electrically conductive fibers for attacks on electrical power systems.

The US version is typically labeled "BLU-114/B". BLU is a military acronym for "bomb live unit". The submunition's explosive charge detonates ejecting the carbon filaments from the metal canister. The filaments unwind and drift down until they settle on high voltage power distribution lines.

The submunition is incorporated into the Blackout Bomb CBU-94. The CBU-94 consists of a SUU-66/B tactical munitions dispenser with 202 BLU-114/B submunitions. The submunitions each have a parachute device to orient and decelerate, and 147 reels of fine conductive fibers.

The US Navy used sea-launched Tomahawk missiles with Kit-2 warheads, involving reels of carbon fibers, in Iraq as part of Operation Desert Storm during the Gulf War in 1991, where it disabled about 85% of the electricity supply. The US Air Force used the CBU-94, dropped by F-117 Nighthawks, during the NATO bombing of Yugoslavia on 2 May 1999, where it disabled more than 70% national grid electricity supply. The supply was restored in less than 24 hours though was later disrupted by a further attack on 7 May 1999. It was again used following the 2003 invasion of Iraq.

=== South Korea ===
South Korea has announced plans to build graphite bombs for use against North Korea to paralyse its electric grid in the event of a new war breaking out on the Korean Peninsula, subject to funding from the country's finance ministry. The weapons have been developed by South Korea's Agency for Defense Development, Yonhap News Agency reported, as one element of the kill chain pre-emptive strike program. Contractors were selected in 2020 and the weapons were intended to be delivered by 2024, and appear to have been tested by 2026.

=== China ===
In June 2025, the CCTV news agency shared an animated video showing a domestically produced graphite bomb, attributed to the China Aerospace Science and Technology Corporation. It was shown to be fired from a land-based vehicle, ejecting 90 cylindrical submunitions. These submunitions detonate in mid-air releasing chemically treated carbon filaments designed to short-circuit high-voltage equipment. It has a range of 290 km, with a warhead weighing 490 kg. It is claimed to affect an area of at least 10,000 m^{2}.

=== North Korea ===
In April 2026, North Korea claimed to have conducted tests with carbon-fiber graphite bombs. It was described as a “special asset of strategic nature to be combined with and applied to various military means in different spheres" by state media.

=== Ukraine ===
In April 2026, Russian sources claimed that Ukrainian drones used graphite-based warheads in strikes on occupied parts of Donetsk Oblast during the wider Russo-Ukrainian war, but no official confirmation was available. Reports suggested that if used, they may have been mounted on Ukrainian FP-1 or FP-2 drones, based on analysis of debris.

== See also ==
- Electromagnetic pulse (EMP)
- Operation Outward
- Seilbomb
