= Operation Herbstreise =

German deception operation in support of Operation Sealion

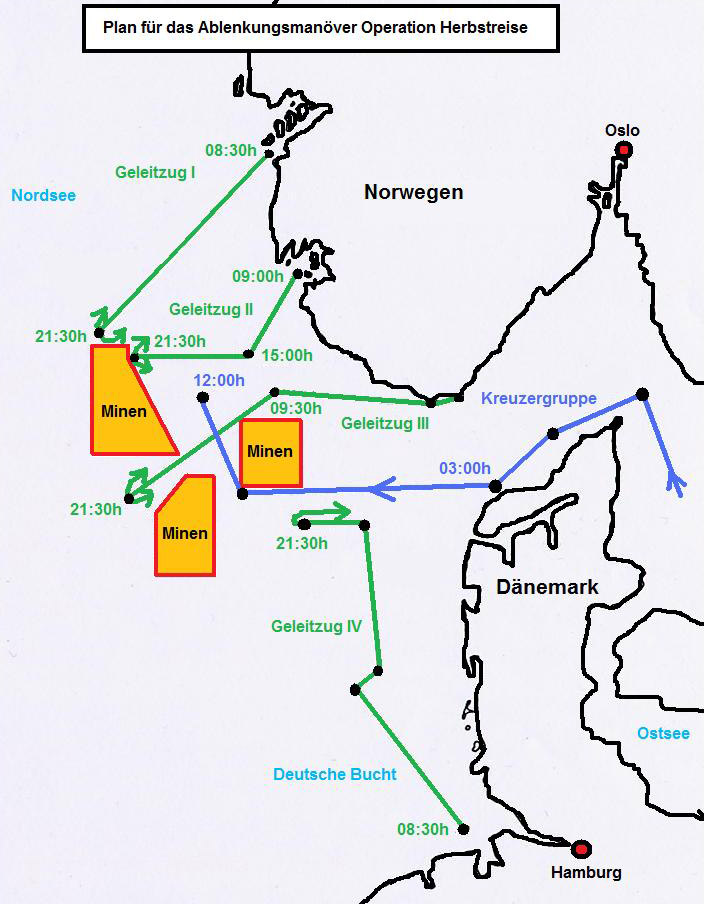
Plan of the German "Operation Herbstreise" (Operation Autumn Journey)

During World War II, Operation Herbstreise ("'Autumn Journey'" in German) was a plan for military deception operations to support Operation Sealion (Operation Seelöwe in German), the intended German invasion of the United Kingdom in 1940. The plan would have involved convoys of large and empty transport ships setting out from Norway and Germany, apparently threatening the east coasts of Scotland and Northeast England, while the actual invasion force would have assaulted Southern England. The invasion was indefinitely postponed in September 1940, removing the necessity for a deception operation.

== Background ==
Some tentative planning for an invasion of the United Kingdom had been carried out by the Kriegsmarine, the German navy, in November 1939. The largest obstacle to an invasion was the massive superiority of the Royal Navy. The Home Fleet, by the summer of 1940, could muster five battleships, three battlecruisers, eleven cruisers and fifty-three destroyers; more destroyers were based around the coast giving a total of 115 in home waters. During the Norwegian campaign, the Kriegsmarine had suffered severe losses leaving only ten destroyers operational. The two battleships, Scharnhorst and Gneisenau had been damaged and were still under repair.

Admiral Erich Raeder, the head of the Kriegsmarine, suggested the possibility of an amphibious landing in England to Adolf Hitler on 20 June 1940 but he was unenthusiastic. Once it became apparent that the British were unlikely to surrender a Hitler Directive, issued in early July, authorised preparations for landing operations, should circumstances require them. Planning was well advanced when a feint operation far to the north, intended to draw away the major units of the Home Fleet, was proposed on 1 August by Admiral Rolf Carls, the Commander-in-Chief of Marine Group Command East.

== Plan ==
Herbstreise would consist of four convoys of transport ships, simulating an invasion of the British east coast between Aberdeen and Newcastle upon Tyne. A proposal to land a force of up to 1,000 men on the Shetland Islands was discarded at an early stage. Five or six days before the day of the invasion ("S-Day"), the heavy cruisers Admiral Hipper and Admiral Scheer were to begin a sortie to attack the British armed merchant cruisers of the Northern Patrol between the Faroe Islands and Iceland, with the hope of drawing away some of the more powerful ships of the Home Fleet. The transport convoys would embark troops, secretly to disembark them overnight, before entering the North Sea. A distant escort was to consist of two light cruisers; Nürnberg and Köln, together with the gunnery training ship Bremse, three fleet escort ships and two torpedo boats. This cruiser force would be under orders to engage inferior British forces, but to withdraw in the face of superior ones, even if this would lead to the loss of the convoys.

=== Convoy I ===
This convoy would embark troops from the 69th Infantry Division at Bergen on S-Day minus 3. The troopships would be Stettiner Grief, Dr Heinrich Wiegand and Pommern. Escort was six minesweepers and anti-submarine vessels, mainly armed trawlers.

=== Convoy II ===
This would embark troops of the 24th Infantry Division at Stavanger and disembark them at Haugesund. The troopships were Steinburg, Bugsee, Ilse LM Russ and Flottbeck, with eight escorts including two torpedo boats.

=== Convoy III ===
Embarking troops from 214th Infantry Division at Arendal and disembarking at Kristiansand. The troopships were Iller, Sabine, Howaldt and Lumme, escorted by four old torpedo boats.

=== Convoy IV ===
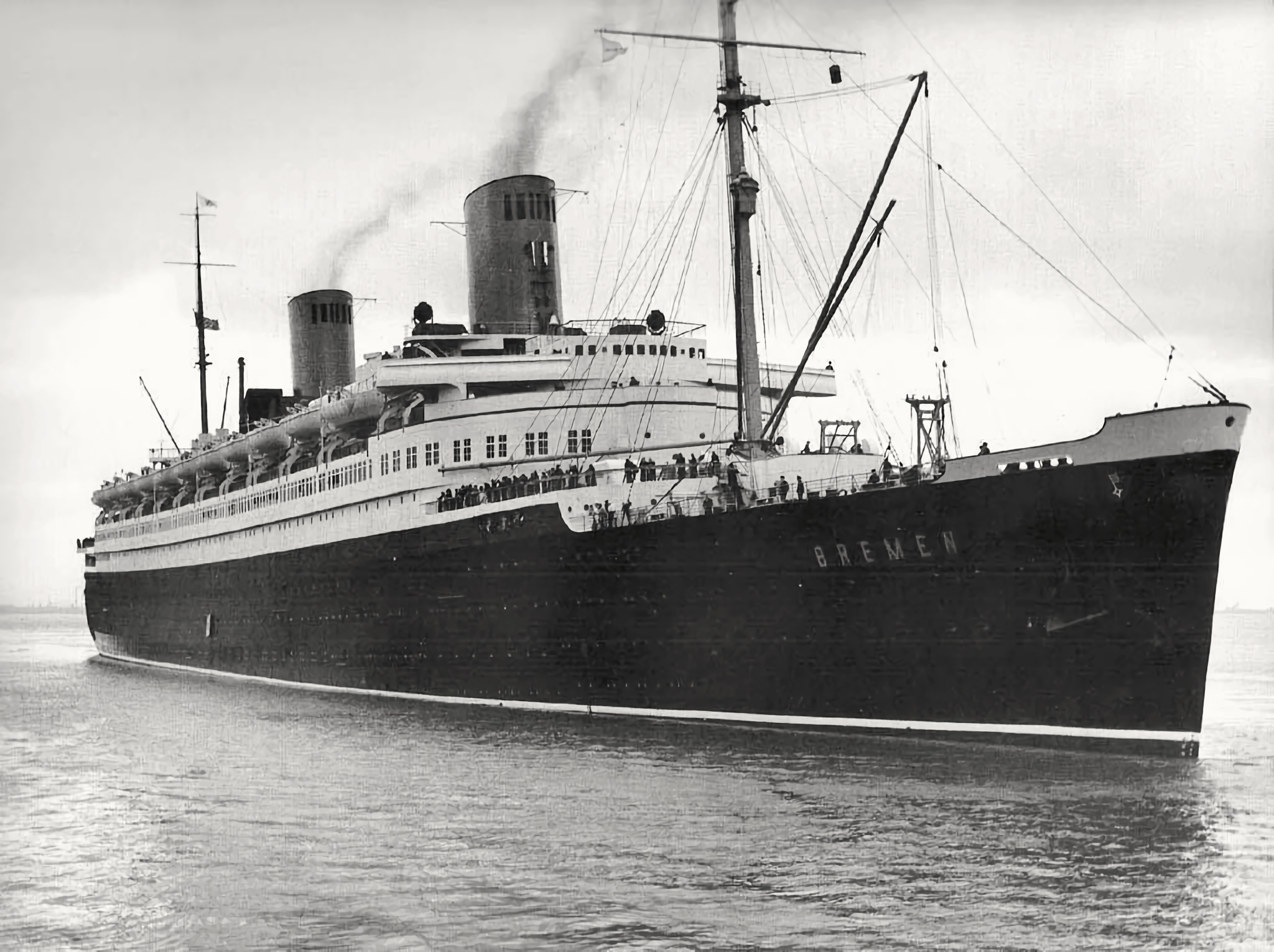
TS Bremen, one of the large ocean liners earmarked for Convoy IV.

This convoy consisted of four fast ocean liners; Europa, Bremen, Gneisenau and Potsdam. They were to embark (or in some cases, only simulate embarkation) troops at Bremerhaven and Hamburg, later disembarking them at Cuxhaven. Escorts were the light cruiser Emden and five torpedo boats.

Radio deception was to be provided by three trawlers, between Iceland and Norway. The convoys from Norway were to scatter late on S-Day minus 2 and return to Norwegian coastal waters, while Convoy IV was to remain in formation and return to the Baltic Sea by way of the Skagerrak. All the ships were required to remain in readiness, in case another sortie was required.

== Abandonment ==
In the event Operation Sealion was postponed from 15 September by five days and then to 24 September. On 14 September, Hitler advised that the decision to go ahead would be confirmed on 17 September, when the Wehrmacht was told that the decision was delayed "until further notice". Some preparations continued into 1941 as a deception.

== Analysis ==
The Admiralty had decided on 20 July that the heavy units of the Home Fleet would not be deployed against an invasion force unless German capital ships were detected, so it seems unlikely that Herbstreise would have had much impact on the Royal Navy countering of a Channel crossing. The energy spent by Kriegsmarine planners on deception and the resources they were prepared to commit to it, compares strikingly with the rather minimal preparations for the defence of the landing fleet. This suggests that there was little enthusiasm for the whole invasion project on the part of the naval commanders, and that Herbstreise may have been an attempt to preserve their ships from destruction in the Channel.
