= Operation Sea Lion =

1940 plan for German invasion of Britain

- Part of Western Front of World War II
- Initial German plan
- Operational scope: Normandy, the Belgian coastline, the English Channel and the English coastline; initial Army proposals of 25 July 1940 envisaging landings from Kent to Dorset, Isle of Wight and parts of Devon; subsequently refined to a confined group of four landing sites in East Sussex and western Kent
- Type: Amphibious invasion
- Planned: September 1940
- Planned by: OKW
- Objective: Elimination of the United Kingdom as a base of military operations against the Axis powers
- Outcome: Eventual cancellation and diversion of German, Italian, and other Axis forces for Operation Barbarossa

Operation Sea Lion, also written as Operation Sealion (German: Unternehmen Seelöwe), was Nazi Germany's code name for their planned invasion of the United Kingdom. It was to have taken place during the Battle of Britain, nine months after the start of the Second World War. Following the armistice with France after the Battle of France, Adolf Hitler, the German Führer and Supreme Commander of the Armed Forces, hoped the British government would accept his offer to end the state of war between the two. He considered invasion to be a last resort, to be used only if all other options had failed.

As a precondition for the invasion of Britain, Hitler demanded both air and naval superiority over the English Channel and the proposed landing sites. The German forces achieved neither at any point of the war. Further, both the German High Command and Hitler himself held serious doubts about the prospects for success. Nevertheless, both the German Army and Navy undertook major preparations for an invasion. These included training troops, developing specialised weapons and equipment, modifying transport vessels and the collection of a large number of river barges and transport ships on the Channel coast. However, in light of mounting Luftwaffe losses in the Battle of Britain and the absence of any sign that the Royal Air Force had been defeated, Hitler postponed Sea Lion indefinitely on 17 September 1940. It was never put into action.

== Background ==
Adolf Hitler hoped for a negotiated peace with the UK and made no preparations for amphibious assault on Britain until the Fall of France. At the time, the only forces with experience and modern equipment for such landings were the Japanese, which they used during the Battle of Wuhan in 1938.

=== Outbreak of war and fall of Poland ===
In September 1939, the successful German invasion of Poland infringed on both a French and a British alliance with Poland and both countries declared war on Germany. On 9 October, Hitler's "Directive No. 6 for the Conduct of the War" planned an offensive to defeat these allies and "win as much territory as possible in Holland, Belgium, and northern France to serve as a base for the successful prosecution of the air and sea war against England".

With the prospect of the Channel ports falling under Kriegsmarine (German Navy) control, Grand Admiral (Großadmiral) Erich Raeder (head of the Kriegsmarine) attempted to anticipate the obvious next step that might entail and instructed his operations officer, Kapitän Hansjürgen Reinicke, to draw up a document examining "the possibility of troop landings in England should the future progress of the war make the problem arise". Reinicke spent five days on this study and set forth the following prerequisites:

- Eliminating or sealing off Royal Navy forces from the landing and approach areas.
- Eliminating the Royal Air Force.
- Destroying all Royal Navy units in the coastal zone.
- Preventing British submarine action against the landing fleet.

On 22 November 1939, the Head of Luftwaffe (German Air Force) intelligence Joseph "Beppo" Schmid presented his "Proposal for the Conduct of Air Warfare", which argued for a counter to the British blockade and said "Key is to paralyse the British trade" by blocking imports to Britain and attacking seaports. The OKW (Oberkommando der Wehrmacht or "High Command of the Armed Forces") considered the options and Hitler's 29 November "Directive No. 9 – Instructions For Warfare Against The Economy of the Enemy" stated that once the coast had been secured, the Luftwaffe and Kriegsmarine were to blockade UK ports with sea mines, attack shipping and warships, and make air attacks on shore installations and industrial production. This directive remained in force in the first phase of the Battle of Britain.

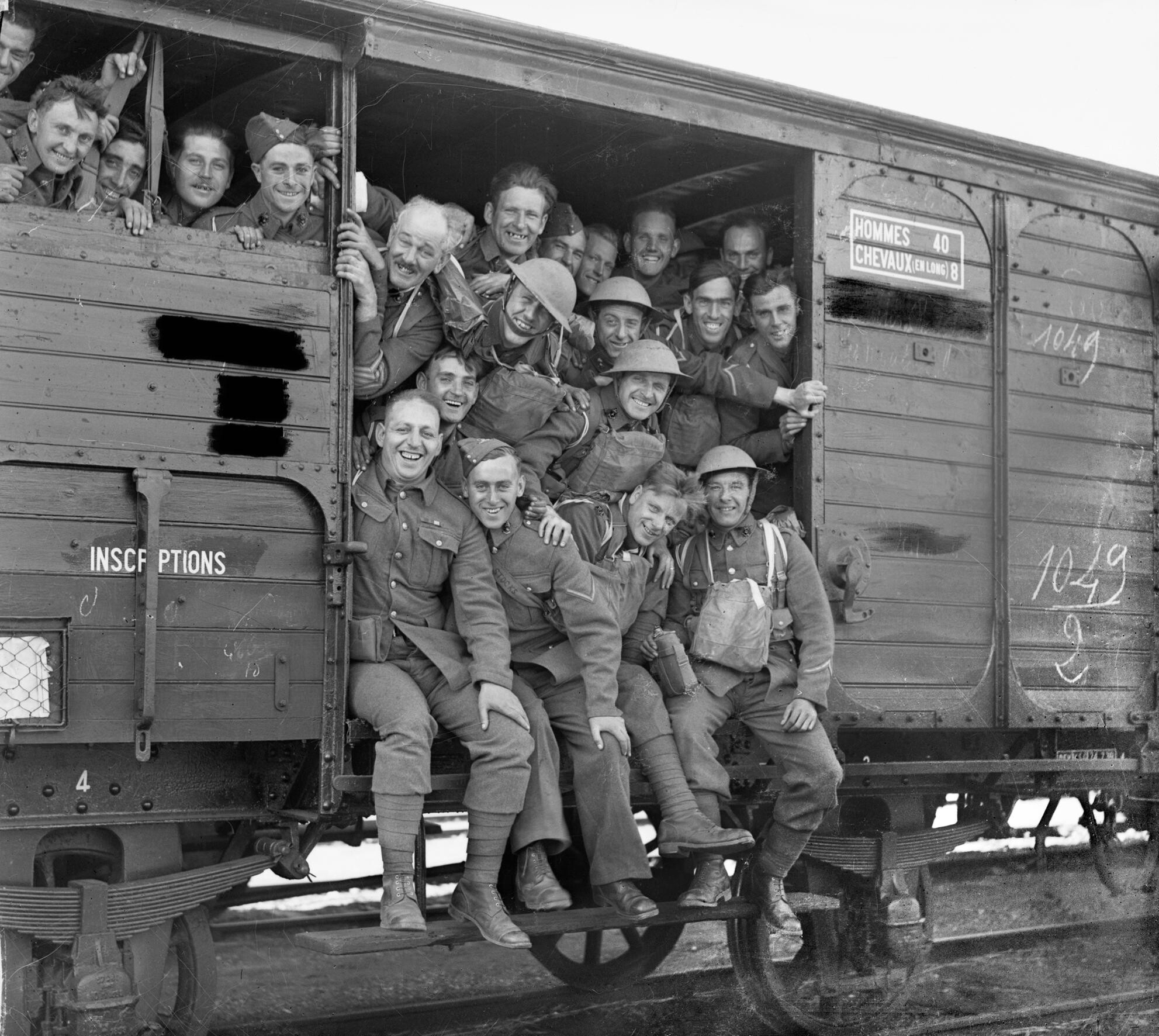
British soldiers in France in 1939

In December 1939, the German Army issued its own study paper (designated Nordwest) and solicited opinions and input from both the Kriegsmarine and the Luftwaffe. The paper outlined an assault on England's eastern coast between The Wash and the River Thames by troops crossing the North Sea from ports in the Low Countries. It suggested airborne troops as well as seaborne landings of 100,000 infantry in East Anglia, transported by the Kriegsmarine, which was also to prevent Royal Navy ships from getting through the Channel, while the Luftwaffe had to control airspace over the landings. The Kriegsmarine response was focused on pointing out the many difficulties to be surmounted if invading England was to be a viable option. It could not envisage taking on the Royal Navy Home Fleet and said it would take a year to organise shipping for the troops. Reichsmarschall Hermann Göring, head of the Luftwaffe, responded with a single-page letter in which he stated, "[A] combined operation having the objective of landing in England must be rejected. It could only be the final act of an already victorious war against Britain as otherwise the preconditions for success of a combined operation would not be met".

=== The fall of France ===
Germany's swift and successful occupation of France and the Low Countries gained control of the Channel coast, facing what Schmid's 1939 report called their "most dangerous enemy". Raeder met Hitler on 21 May 1940 and raised the topic of invasion, but he warned of the risks and expressed a preference for blockade by air, submarines and raiders.

By the end of May, the Kriegsmarine had become even more opposed to invading Britain following its costly victory in Norway; after Operation Weserübung, the Kriegsmarine had only one heavy cruiser, two light cruisers, and four destroyers available for operations. Raeder was strongly opposed to Sea Lion, for over half of the Kriegsmarine surface fleet had been either sunk or badly damaged in Weserübung, and his service was hopelessly outnumbered by the ships of the Royal Navy. British parliamentarians still arguing for peace negotiations were defeated in the May 1940 War Cabinet Crisis, but throughout July the Germans continued with attempts to find a diplomatic solution.

=== Invasion planning ===
In a report presented on 30 June, OKW Chief of Staff Alfred Jodl reviewed options to increase pressure on Britain to agree to a negotiated peace, which included a direct invasion on the British Isles or a peripherial strategy against British strongholds in the Mediterranean such as Malta, Gibraltar and the Suez Canal in cooperation with Italy and Spain. The first priority was to eliminate the Royal Air Force and gain air supremacy. Intensified air attacks against shipping and the economy could affect food supplies and civilian morale in the long term. Reprisal attacks of terror bombing had the potential to cause quicker capitulation but the effect on morale was uncertain. Once the Luftwaffe had control of the air and the British economy had been weakened, an invasion would be a last resort or a final strike ("Todesstoss") after the UK had already been practically defeated, but could have a quick result. At a meeting that day, OKH Chief of General Staff Franz Halder heard from Secretary of State Ernst von Weizsäcker that Hitler had turned his attention to Russia. Halder met Admiral Otto Schniewind on 1 July, and they shared views without understanding each other's position. Both thought that air superiority was needed first, and could make the invasion unnecessary. They agreed that minefields and U-boats could limit the threat posed by the Royal Navy; Schniewind emphasised the significance of weather conditions.

On 2 July, the OKW asked the services to start preliminary planning for an invasion, as Hitler had concluded that invasion would be achievable in certain conditions, the first of which was command of the air, and specifically asked the Luftwaffe when this would be achieved. On 4 July, after asking General Erich Marcks to begin planning an attack on Russia, Halder heard from the Luftwaffe that they planned to eliminate the RAF, destroying its aircraft manufacturing and supply systems, with damage to naval forces as a secondary aim. A Luftwaffe report presented to the OKW at a meeting on 11 July said that it would take 14 to 28 days to achieve air superiority. The meeting also heard that Britain was discussing an agreement with Russia. On the same day, Grand Admiral Raeder visited Hitler at the Berghof to persuade him that the best way to pressure the British into a peace agreement would be a siege combining air and submarine attacks. Hitler agreed with him that invasion would be a last resort.

Jodl set out the OKW proposals for the proposed invasion in a memorandum issued on 12 July, which described operation Löwe (Lion) as "a river crossing on a broad front", irritating the Kriegsmarine. On 13 July, Hitler met Field Marshal von Brauchitsch and Halder at Berchtesgaden and they presented detailed plans prepared by the army on the assumption that the navy would provide safe transport. To the surprise of Von Brauchitsch and Halder, and completely at odds with his normal practice, Hitler did not ask any questions about specific operations, had no interest in details, and made no recommendations to improve the plans; instead, he simply told OKW to start preparations.

==== Directive No. 16: Operation Sea Lion ====
On 16 July 1940 Hitler issued Führer Directive No. 16, setting in motion preparations for a landing in Britain. He prefaced the order by stating: "As England, despite her hopeless military situation, still shows no signs of willingness to come to terms, I have decided to prepare, and if necessary to carry out, a landing operation against her. This operation aimed to eliminate the English Motherland as a base from which the war against Germany can be continued, and, if necessary, to occupy the country completely." The code name for the invasion was Seelöwe, "Sea Lion".

Hitler's directive set four conditions for the invasion to occur:

- The RAF was to be "beaten down in its morale and in fact, that it can no longer display any appreciable aggressive force in opposition to the German crossing".
- The English Channel was to be swept of British mines at the crossing points, and the Strait of Dover must be blocked at both ends by German mines.
- The coastal zone between occupied France and England must be dominated by heavy artillery.
- The Royal Navy must be sufficiently engaged in the North Sea and the Mediterranean so that it could not intervene in the crossing. British home squadrons must be damaged or destroyed by air and torpedo attacks.

This ultimately placed responsibility for Sea Lion's success squarely on the shoulders of Raeder and Göring, neither of whom had the slightest enthusiasm for the venture and, in fact, did little to hide their opposition to it. Nor did Directive 16 provide for a combined operational headquarters, similar to the Allies' creation of the Supreme Headquarters Allied Expeditionary Force (SHAEF) for the later Normandy landings, under which all three service branches (Army, Navy, and Air Force) could work together to plan, co-ordinate, and execute such a complex undertaking.

The invasion was to be on a broad front, from around Ramsgate to beyond the Isle of Wight. Preparations, including overcoming the RAF, were to be in place by mid August.

==== Discussion ====
Grand Admiral Raeder sent a memorandum to OKW on 19 July, complaining about the onus placed on the navy in relation to the army and air force, and stating that the navy would be unable to achieve its objectives.

The first joint services conference on the proposed invasion was held by Hitler in Berlin on 21 July, with Raeder, Brauchitsch, and Luftwaffe Chief of Staff Hans Jeschonnek. Hitler told them that the British had no hope of survival, and ought to negotiate, but were hoping to get Russia to intervene and halt German oil supplies. Invasion was very risky, and he asked them if direct attacks by air and submarine could take effect by mid September. Jeschonnek proposed large bombing attacks so that responding RAF fighters could be shot down. The idea that invasion could be a surprise "river crossing" was dismissed by Raeder, and the navy could not complete its preparations by mid August. Hitler wanted the air attack to commence early in August and, if it succeeded, the invasion was to start around 25 August before weather deteriorated. Hitler's main interest was the question of countering potential Russian intervention. Halder outlined his first thoughts on defeating Russian forces. Detailed plans were to be made to attack the Soviet Union.

Raeder met Hitler on 25 July to report on navy progress: they were not sure if preparations could be completed during August: he was to present plans at a conference on 31 July. On 28 July, he told OKW that ten days would be needed to get the first wave of troops across the Channel, even on a much narrower front. Planning was to resume. In his diary, Halder noted that if what Raeder had said was true, "all previous statements by the navy were so much rubbish and we can throw away the whole plan of invasion". On the next day, Halder dismissed the navy's claims and required a new plan.

The Luftwaffe announced on 29 July that they could begin a major air attack at the start of August, and their intelligence reports gave them confidence of a decisive result. Half of their bombers were to be kept in reserve to support the invasion. At a meeting with the army, the navy proposed delay until May 1941, when the new battleships Bismarck and Tirpitz would be ready. A navy memorandum issued on 30 July said invasion would be vulnerable to the Royal Navy, and autumn weather could prevent necessary maintenance of supplies. The OKW assessed alternatives, including attacking the British in the Mediterranean, and favoured extended operations against England while remaining on good terms with Russia.

At the Berghof conference on 31 July, the Luftwaffe were not represented. Raeder said barge conversions would take until 15 September, leaving the only possible 1940 invasion dates as 22–26 September, when weather was likely to be unsuitable. Landings would have to be on a narrow front and would be better in spring 1941. Hitler wanted the invasion in September as the British army was increasing in strength. After Raeder left, Hitler told von Brauchitsch and Halder that the air attack was to start around 5 August; eight to fourteen days after that, he would decide on the landing operation. London was showing new-found optimism, and he attributed this to their hopes of intervention by Russia, which Germany was to attack in the spring of 1941.

==== Air and sea warfare against England ====
On 1 August 1940, through Führer Directive No. 17, Hitler instructed intensified air and sea warfare to "establish the necessary conditions for the final conquest of England". From 5 August, subject to weather delays, the Luftwaffe was "to overpower the English Air Force with all the forces at its command, in the shortest possible time." Attacks were then to be made on ports and food stocks, while leaving alone ports to be used in the invasion, and "air attacks on enemy warships and merchant ships may be reduced except where some particularly favourable target happens to present itself." The Luftwaffe was to keep sufficient forces in reserve for the proposed invasion and was not to target civilians without a direct order from Hitler in response to RAF terror bombing. No decision had been reached on the choice between immediate decisive action and a siege. The Germans hoped the air action would force the British to negotiate and make invasion unnecessary.

== Land forces ==
In the Army plan of 25 July 1940, the invasion force was to be organised into two army groups drawn from the 6th Army, the 9th Army and the 16th Army. The first wave of the landing would have consisted of thirteen infantry and mountain divisions, the second wave of eight panzer and motorised infantry divisions and finally, the third wave was formed of six further infantry divisions. The initial assault would have also included two airborne divisions under Luftwaffe command, and the special forces of the Brandenburg Regiment, controlled by the Abwehr.

This initial plan was vetoed by opposition from both the Kriegsmarine and the Luftwaffe, who successfully argued that an amphibious force could only be assured air and naval protection if confined to a narrow front, and that the landing areas should be as far from Royal Navy bases as possible. The definitive order of battle adopted on 30 August 1940 envisaged a first wave of nine divisions from the 9th and 16th armies landing along four stretches of beach – two infantry divisions on beach 'B' between Folkestone and New Romney supported by a special forces company of the Brandenburg Regiment, two infantry divisions on beach 'C' between Rye and Hastings supported by three battalions of submersible/floating tanks, two infantry divisions on beach 'D' between Bexhill and Eastbourne supported by one battalion of submersible/floating tanks and a second company of the Brandenburg Regiment, and three infantry divisions on beach 'E' between Beachy Head and Brighton. A single airborne division would land in Kent north of Hythe; with the objective of seizing the aerodrome at Lympne and bridge-crossings over the Royal Military Canal, and in assisting the ground forces in capturing Folkestone. Folkestone (to the east) and Newhaven (to the west) were the only cross-channel port facilities that would have been accessible to the invasion forces; and much depended on these being captured substantially intact or with the capability of rapid repair; in which case the second wave of eight divisions (including all the motorised and armoured divisions) might be unloaded directly onto their respective quaysides. A further six infantry divisions were allocated to the third wave.

The order of battle defined on 30 August remained as the agreed overall plan but was always considered as potentially subject to change if circumstances demanded it. The Army High Command continued to press for a wider landing area if possible, against the opposition of the Kriegsmarine; in August they had won the concession that, if the opportunity arose, a force might be landed directly from ships onto the seafront at Brighton, perhaps supported by a second airborne force landing on the South Downs. Contrariwise, the Kriegsmarine (fearful of possible fleet action against the invasion forces from Royal Navy ships in Portsmouth) insisted that the divisions enshipped from Cherbourg and Le Havre for landing on beach 'E', might be diverted to any one of the other beaches where sufficient space allowed.

Each of the first wave landing forces was divided into three echelons. The first echelon, carried across the Channel on barges, coasters and small motor launches, would consist of the main infantry assault force. The second echelon, carried across the Channel in larger transport vessels, would consist predominantly of artillery, armoured vehicles and other heavy equipment. The third echelon, carried across the channel on barges, would consist of the vehicles, horses, stores and personnel of the division-level support services. Loading of barges and transports with heavy equipment, vehicles and stores would start in Antwerp nine days before the first day of Operation Sealion ("S-Tag" minus nine); and S-Tag minus eight in Dunkirk, with horses not loaded till S-Tag minus two. All troops would be loaded onto their barges from French or Belgian ports on S-Tag minus two or S-Tag minus one. The first echelon would land on the beaches on S-Tag itself, preferably at daybreak around two hours after high tide. The barges used for the first echelon would be retrieved by tugs on the afternoon of S-Tag, and those still in working order would be drawn up alongside the transport vessels to trans-ship the second echelon overnight, so that much of the second echelon and third echelon could land on S-Tag plus one, with the remainder on S-Tag plus two. The Navy intended that all four invasion fleets would return across the Channel on the night of S-Tag plus two, having been moored for three full days off the South coast of England. The Army had sought to have the third echelon cross in later separate convoys to avoid men and horses having to wait for as long as four days and nights in their barges, but the Kriegsmarine were insistent that they could only protect the four fleets from Royal Navy attack if all vessels crossed the Channel together. A total of 138,000 men would have been landed in the first two days, rising to 248,000 within the first fortnight.

In the summer of 1940, the headquarters staff of the British Army's Commander-in-Chief, Home Forces tended to consider East Anglia and the East coast to be the most likely landing sites for a German invasion force, as this would have offered much greater opportunities to seize ports and natural harbours, and would be further from naval forces at Portsmouth. But then the accumulation of invasion barges in French ports from late August 1940 rather indicated a landing on the South coast. Consequently, the main Home Forces mobile reserve force was held back around London, so as to be able to move forwards to protect the capital, either into Kent or Essex. Hence, Sea Lion landings in Kent and Sussex would have been initially opposed by XII Corps of Eastern Command with three infantry divisions and two independent brigades and V Corps of Southern Command with three infantry divisions. In reserve were two more Corps under GHQ Home Forces; located south of London was the VII Corps with the 1st Canadian Infantry Division, an armoured division and an independent armoured brigade, while north of London was IV Corps with an armoured division, infantry division and independent infantry brigade. See British army anti invasion preparations.

== Air power ==
=== Airborne forces ===
The success of the German invasion of Denmark and Norway, on 9 April 1940, had relied extensively on the use of paratroop and glider-borne formations (Fallschirmjäger) to capture key defensive points in advance of the main invasion forces. The same airborne tactics had also been used in support of the invasions of Belgium and the Netherlands on 10 May 1940. However, although spectacular success had been achieved in the airborne assault on Fort Eben-Emael in Belgium, German airborne forces had come close to disaster in their attempt to seize the Dutch government and capital of The Hague. Around 1,300 of the 22nd Air Landing Division had been captured (subsequently shipped to Britain as prisoners of war), around 250 Junkers Ju 52 transport aircraft had been lost, and several hundred elite paratroops and air-landing infantry had been killed or injured. Consequently, even in September 1940 the Luftwaffe had the capacity to provide only around 3,000 airborne troops to participate in the first wave of Operation Sea Lion.

=== Battle of Britain ===
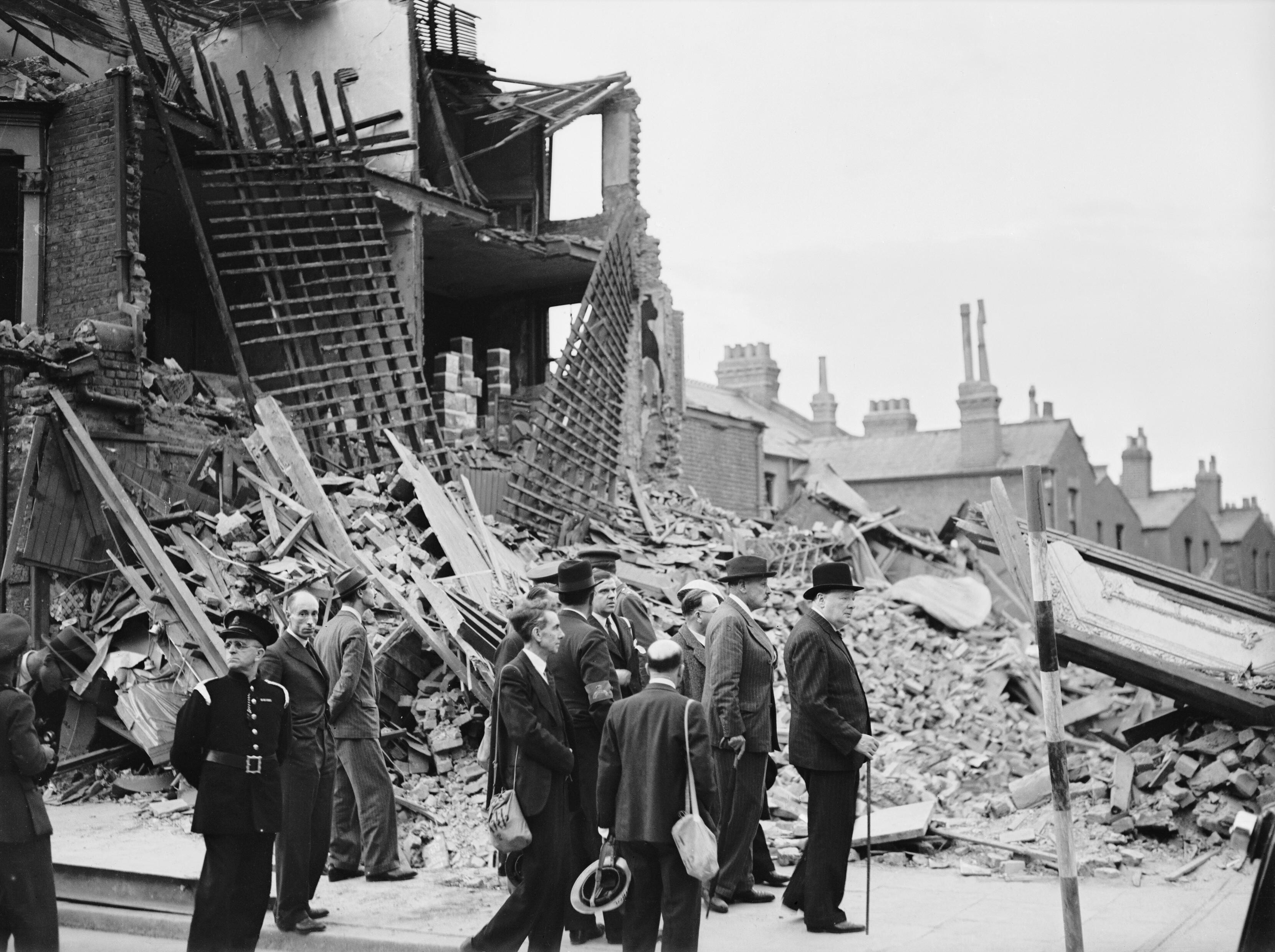
Winston Churchill visiting bomb-damaged areas of the East End of London, 8 September 1940

The Battle of Britain began in early July 1940 with attacks on shipping and ports in the Kanalkampf, which forced RAF Fighter Command into defensive action. In addition, wider raids gave aircrew experience of day and night navigation and tested the defences. On 13 August, the German Luftwaffe began a series of concentrated aerial attacks (designated Unternehmen Adlerangriff or Operation Eagle Attack) on targets throughout the United Kingdom in an attempt to destroy the RAF and establish air superiority over Great Britain. The change in emphasis of the bombing from RAF bases to bombing London, however, turned Adlerangriff into a short-range strategic bombing operation.

The effect of the switch in strategy is disputed. Some historians argue the change in strategy lost the Luftwaffe the opportunity of winning the air battle or air superiority. Others argue the Luftwaffe achieved little in the air battle and the RAF was not on the verge of collapse, as often claimed. Another perspective has also been put forward, which suggests the Germans could not have gained air superiority before the weather window closed. Others have said that it was unlikely the Luftwaffe would ever have been able to destroy RAF Fighter Command. If British losses became severe, the RAF could simply have withdrawn northward and regrouped. It could then deploy if the Germans launched an invasion. Most historians agree Sea Lion would have failed regardless because of the weakness of the German Kriegsmarine compared to the Royal Navy.

=== Limitations of the Luftwaffe ===
The record of the Luftwaffe against naval combat vessels up to that point in the war was poor. In the Norwegian campaign, despite eight weeks of continuous air supremacy, the Luftwaffe sank only two British warships: the light cruiser HMS Curlew and the destroyer HMS Gurkha. The German aircrews were not trained or equipped to attack fast-moving naval targets, particularly agile naval destroyers or motor torpedo boats (MTB). The Luftwaffe also lacked armour-piercing bombs and their only aerial torpedo capability, essential for defeating larger warships, consisted of a small number of slow and vulnerable Heinkel He 115 floatplanes. The Luftwaffe made 21 deliberate attacks on small torpedo boats during the Battle of Britain, sinking none. The British had between 700 and 800 small coastal craft (MTBs, Motor Gun Boats and smaller vessels), making them a critical threat if the Luftwaffe could not deal with the force. Only nine MTBs were lost to air attack out of 115 sunk by various means throughout the Second World War. Only nine destroyers were sunk by air attack in 1940, out of a force of over 100 operating in British waters at the time. Only five were sunk while evacuating Dunkirk, despite large periods of German air superiority, thousands of sorties flown, and hundreds of tons of bombs dropped. The Luftwaffe's record against merchant shipping was also unimpressive: it sank only one in every 100 British vessels passing through British waters in 1940, and most of this total was achieved using mines.

==== Luftwaffe special equipment ====
Had an invasion taken place, the Bf 110 equipped Erprobungsgruppe 210 would have dropped Seilbomben just prior to the landings. This was a secret weapon which would have been used to blackout the electricity network in south-east England. The equipment for dropping the wires was fitted to the Bf 110 aeroplanes and tested. It involved dropping extraneous wires across high voltage lines to create short-circuits and was probably as dangerous to the aircraft crews as to the British.

=== Italian air force ===
Upon hearing of Hitler's intentions, Italian dictator Benito Mussolini, through his Foreign Minister Count Galeazzo Ciano, quickly offered up to ten divisions and thirty squadrons of Italian aircraft for the proposed invasion. Hitler initially declined any such aid but eventually allowed a small contingent of Italian fighters and bombers, the Italian Air Corps (Corpo Aereo Italiano or CAI), to assist in the Luftwaffe's aerial campaign over Britain in October and November 1940.

== Navy ==
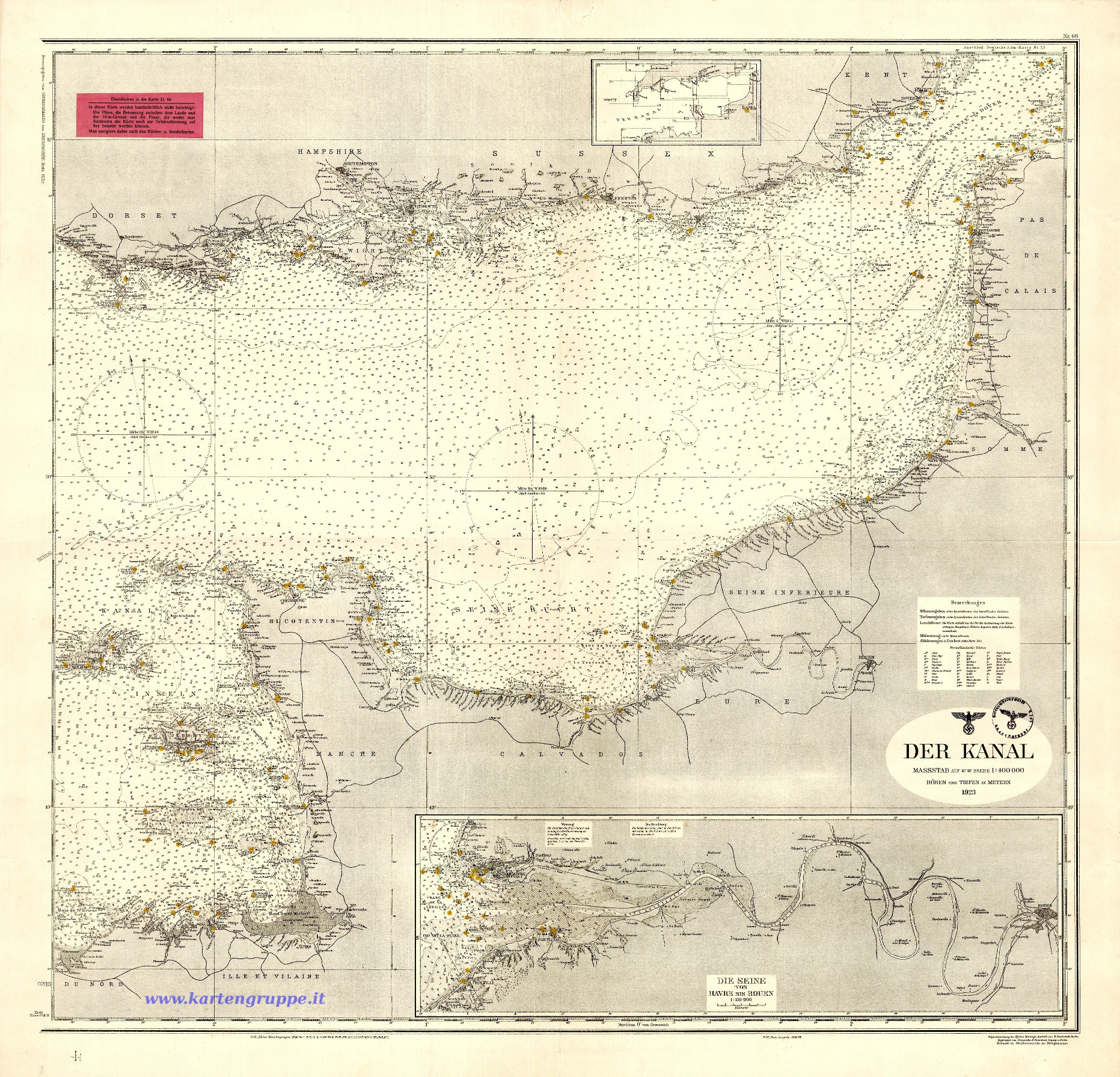
The Channel (Der Kanal), D.66 Kriegsmarine nautical chart, 1943

The most daunting problem for Germany in protecting an invasion fleet was the small size of its navy. The Kriegsmarine, already numerically far inferior to Britain's Royal Navy, had lost a sizeable portion of its large modern surface ships in April 1940 during the Norwegian campaign, either as complete losses or due to battle damage. In particular, the loss of two light cruisers and ten destroyers was crippling, as these were the very warships most suited to operating in the Channel narrows where the invasion would likely take place. Most U-boats, the most powerful arm of the Kriegsmarine, were meant for destroying ships, not supporting an invasion.

Although the Royal Navy could not bring the whole of its naval superiority to bear – as most of the fleet was engaged in the Atlantic and Mediterranean, and a substantial proportion had been detached to support Operation Menace against Dakar – the British Home Fleet still had a very large advantage in numbers. It was debatable whether British ships were as vulnerable to enemy air attack as the Germans hoped. During the Dunkirk evacuation, few warships were actually sunk, despite being stationary targets. The overall disparity between the opposing naval forces made the amphibious invasion plan extremely risky, regardless of the outcome in the air. In addition, the Kriegsmarine had allocated its few remaining larger and more modern ships to diversionary operations in the North Sea.

The fleet of defeated France, one of the most powerful and modern in the world, might have tipped the balance against Britain if it had been captured by the Germans. However, the pre-emptive destruction of a large part of the French fleet by the British Attack on Mers-el-Kébir on 3 July 1940 ensured that this could not happen.

Those who believed that, regardless of a potential German victory in the air battle, Sea Lion was still not going to succeed included a number of German General Staff members. After the war, Admiral Karl Dönitz said he believed air superiority was "not enough". Dönitz stated, "[W]e possessed neither control of the air or the sea; nor were we in any position to gain it". In his memoirs, Raeder, commander-in-chief of the Kriegsmarine in 1940, wrote:

[U]p until now the British had never thrown the full power of their fleet into action. However, a German invasion of England would be a matter of life and death for the British, and they would unhesitatingly commit their naval forces, to the last ship and the last man, into an all-out fight for survival. Our Air Force could not be counted on to guard our transports from the British Fleets, because their operations would depend on the weather, if for no other reason. It could not be expected that even for a brief period our Air Force could make up for our lack of naval supremacy.

On 13 August 1940, Jodl, Chief of Operations in the OKW (Oberkommando der Wehrmacht) wrote his "Assessment of the situation arising from the views of the Army and Navy on a landing in England." His first point was that "The landing operation must under no circumstances fail. A failure could leave political consequences, which would go far beyond the military ones." He believed that the Luftwaffe could meet its essential objectives, but if the Kriegsmarine could not meet the operational requirements of the Army for an attack on a broad front with two divisions landed within four days, followed promptly by three further divisions irrespective of weather, "then I consider the landing to be an act of desperation, which would have to be risked in a desperate situation, but which we have no reason whatsoever to undertake at this moment."

=== Deception ===
The Kriegsmarine invested considerable energy in planning and assembling the forces for an elaborate deception plan called Operation Herbstreise or "Autumn Journey". The idea was first mooted by Generaladmiral Rolf Carls on 1 August proposing a feint expedition into the North Sea resembling a troop convoy heading for Scotland, with the aim of drawing the British Home Fleet away from the intended invasion routes. Initially, the convoy was to consist of about ten small cargo ships fitted with false funnels to make them appear larger, and two small hospital ships. As the plan gathered momentum, the large ocean liners Europa, Bremen, Gneisenau and Potsdam were added to the list. These were organised into four separate convoys, escorted by light cruisers, torpedo boats and minesweepers, some of which were obsolete vessels being used by naval training bases. The plan was that three days before the actual invasion, the troopships would load the men and equipment of four divisions in major Norwegian and German ports and put to sea, before unloading them again on the same day in quieter locations. Returning to sea, the convoys would head west towards Scotland before turning around at about 21:00 on the following day. In addition, the only heavy warships available to the Kriegsmarine, the heavy cruisers Admiral Scheer and Admiral Hipper, would attack the British armed merchant cruisers of the Northern Patrol and convoys inbound from Canada; however, the Scheer's repairs overran and if the invasion had taken place in September, would have left the Hipper to operate alone.

=== Minefields ===
Lacking surface naval forces capable of meeting the Home Fleet of the Royal Navy in open battle, the main seaborne defence for the first wave invasion fleets would have been four massive minefields, which were intended to be laid from S minus nine, thus nine days before landing. The ANTON minefield (off Selsey Bill) and the BRUNO minefield (off Beachy Head), each totalling over 3,000 mines in four rows, would have blocked off the invasion beaches against naval forces from Portsmouth, while the counterpart CAESAR minefield would have blocked off beach 'B' from Dover. A fourth minefield, DORA, was to be laid off Lyme Bay to inhibit naval forces from Plymouth. By the autumn of 1940, the Kriegsmarine had achieved considerable success in laying minefields in support of active operations, notably in the night of 31 August 1940 when the 20th Destroyer flotilla suffered heavy losses when running into a newly laid German minefield near the Dutch coast off Texel; however no plans were made to prevent the mines being cleared by the large force of British minesweepers which were based in the area. Vizeadmiral Friedrich Ruge, who was in charge of the mining operation, wrote after the war that if the minefields had been relatively complete, they would have been a "strong obstacle" but that "even a strong obstacle is not an absolute barrier."

=== Landing craft ===
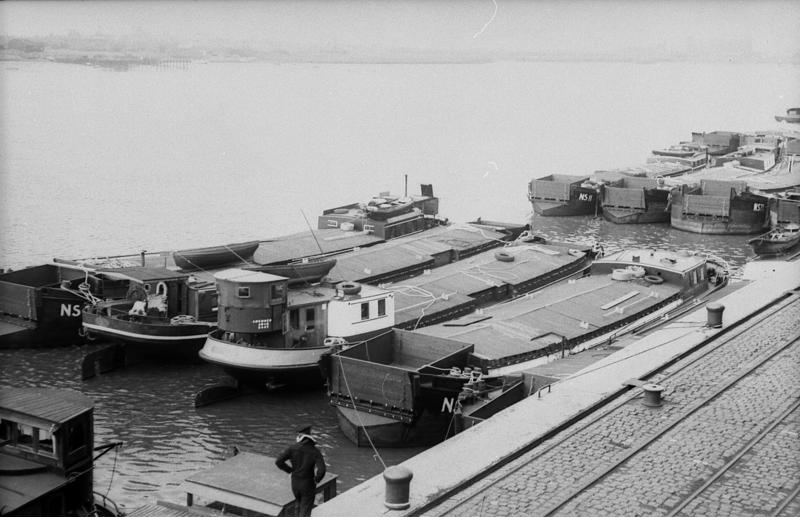
Invasion barges assembled at the German port of Wilhelmshaven.

In 1940 the German Navy was ill-prepared for mounting an amphibious assault the size of Operation Sea Lion. Lacking purpose-built landing craft and both doctrinal and practical experience with amphibious warfare, the Kriegsmarine was largely starting from scratch. Some efforts had been made during the inter-war years to investigate landing military forces by sea, but inadequate funding severely limited any useful progress.

For the successful German invasion of Norway, German naval forces (assisted in places by thick fog) had simply forced an entry into key Norwegian harbours with motor launches and E-boats against stiff resistance from the outgunned Norwegian army and navy, and then unloaded troops from destroyers and troop transports directly onto the dockfronts at Bergen, Egersund, Trondheim, Kristiansand, Arendal and Horten. At Stavanger and Oslo capture of the port was preceded by landing airborne forces. No beach landings were attempted.

The Kriegsmarine had taken some small steps in remedying the landing craft situation with construction of the Pionierlandungsboot 39 (Engineer Landing Boat 39), a self-propelled shallow-draft vessel which could carry 45 infantrymen, two light vehicles or 20 tons of cargo and land on an open beach, unloading via a pair of clamshell doors at the bow. But by late September 1940 only two prototypes had been delivered.

Recognising the need for an even larger craft capable of landing both tanks and infantry onto a hostile shore, the Kriegsmarine began development of the 220-ton Marinefährprahm (MFP) but these too were unavailable in time for a landing on British soil in 1940, the first of them not being commissioned until April 1941.

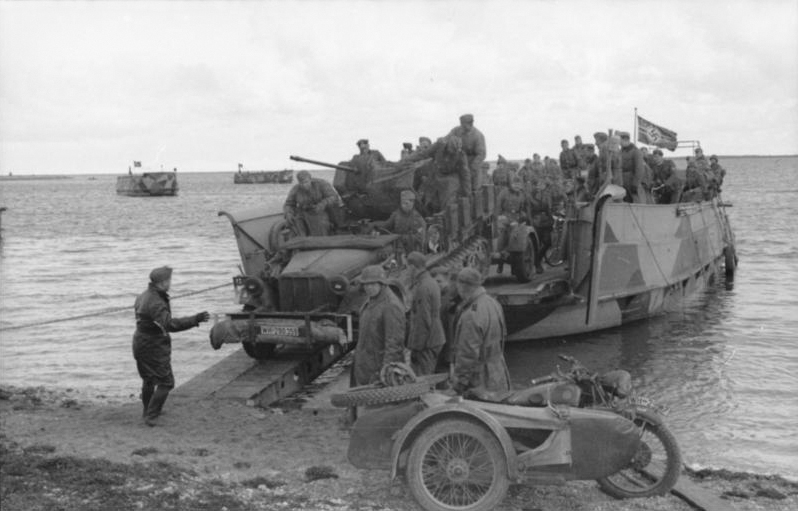
A Pionierlandungsboot

Given barely two months to assemble a large seagoing invasion fleet, the Kriegsmarine opted to convert inland river barges into makeshift landing craft. Approximately 2,400 barges were collected from throughout Europe (860 from Germany, 1,200 from the Netherlands and Belgium and 350 from France). Of these, only about 800 were powered albeit insufficiently to cross the Channel under their own power. All barges would be towed across by tugs, with two barges to a tug in line abreast, preferably one being powered and one unpowered. On reaching the English coast, the powered barges would be cast-off, to beach themselves under their own power; the unpowered barges would be taken inshore as far as possible by the tugs and anchored, so as to settle on the falling tide, their troops unloading some hours later than those on the powered barges. Accordingly, the Sea Lion plans were prepared on the basis that the landings would take place shortly after high tide and on a date when this coincided with sunrise. Towards evening, on the following rising tide, the empty barges would have been retrieved by their tugs to receive the second echelon forces, stores and heavy equipment in the awaiting transport vessels. These transport vessels would have remained moored off the beach throughout the day. By contrast, the Allied D day landings in 1944 were timed to happen at low tide; with all troops and equipment transhipped from their transport vessels to landing craft off-shore overnight.

All the troops intended to land at beach 'E', the westernmost of the four beaches, would cross the channel in larger transport vessels – the barges being towed loaded with equipment but empty of troops – and would then be transferred onto their barges a short distance from the beach. For the landings on the other three beaches, the first echelon of the invasion forces (and their equipment) would be loaded onto their barges in French or Belgian ports, while the second echelon force crossed the channel in associated transport vessels. Once the first echelon had been unloaded onto the beach, the barges would return to the transport vessels to transport the second echelon. The same procedure was envisaged for the second wave (unless the first wave had captured a usable port). Trials showed that this process of trans-shipment in open sea, in any circumstances other than flat calm, would likely take at least 14 hours, such that the disembarkation of the first wave might extend over several tides and several days, with barges and invasion fleet subsequently needing to be escorted together back across the Channel for repairs and reloading. Since loading of the tanks, vehicles and stores of the second wave onto the returned barges and transport ships would take at least a week, the second wave could not be expected to land much less than ten days after the first wave, and more likely longer still.

==== Barge types ====
Two types of inland river barge were generally available in Europe for use in Sea Lion: the péniche, which was 38.5 meters long and carried 360 tons of cargo, and the Kampine, which was 50 meters long and carried 620 tons of cargo. Of the barges collected for the invasion, 1,336 were classified as péniches and 982 as Kampinen. For simplicity's sake, the Germans designated any barge up to the size of a standard péniche as Type A1 and anything larger as Type A2. The "Kampine" was named for the Belgian Campine region, where a network of canals existed, the barges having been designed to meet their locks with their 50x7 metres dimensions.

==== Type A ====
Converting the assembled barges into landing craft involved cutting an opening in the bow for off-loading troops and vehicles, welding longitudinal I-beams and transverse braces to the hull to improve seaworthiness, adding a wooden internal ramp and pouring a concrete floor in the hold to allow for tank transport. As modified, the Type A1 barge could accommodate three medium tanks while the Type A2 could carry four. Tanks, armoured vehicles and artillery were envisaged as crossing the Channel in one of around 170 transport ships, which would be anchored off the landing beaches while the barges disembarked the first echelon of assault troops; those in powered barges disembarking soonest. The empty barges would then have been retrieved by tugs on the following rising tide, so as to have the second echelon (including tanks and other heavy equipment) loaded onto them using ship's derricks. Barges would consequently have shuttled between ships and beaches over at least two days before being assembled together for the escorted night-time return voyage across the Channel.

==== Type B ====
This barge was a Type A altered to carry and rapidly off-load the submersible tanks (Tauchpanzer) developed for use in Sea Lion. They had the advantage of being able to unload their tanks directly into water up to 15 metres (49 ft) in depth, several hundred yards from shore, whereas the unmodified Type A had to be firmly grounded on the beach, making it more vulnerable to enemy fire. The Type B required a longer external ramp (11 meters) with a float attached to the front of it. Once the barge anchored, the crew would extend the internally stowed ramp using block and tackle sets until it was resting on the water's surface. As the first tank rolled forward onto the ramp, its weight would tilt the forward end of the ramp into the water and push it down onto the seabed. Once the tank rolled off, the ramp would bob back up to a horizontal position, ready for the next one to exit. If a barge was securely grounded along its full length, the longer ramp could also be used to discharge submersible tanks directly onto the beach, and beachmasters were given the option of landing tanks by this method, if the risk of loss in submersible running appeared to be too high. The Navy High Command increased its initial order for 60 of these vessels to 70 in order to compensate for expected losses. A further five were ordered on 30 September as a reserve.

==== Type C ====
The Type C barge was specifically converted to carry the Panzer II amphibious tank (Schwimmpanzer). Because of the extra width of the floats attached to this tank, cutting a broad exit ramp into the bow of the barge was not considered advisable as it would have compromised the vessel's seaworthiness to an unacceptable degree. Instead, a large hatch was cut into the stern, thereby allowing the tanks to drive directly into deep water before turning under their own motive power and heading towards shore. The Type C barge could accommodate up to four Schwimmpanzer in its hold. Approximately 14 of these craft were available by the end of September.

==== Type AS ====
During the planning stages of Sea Lion, it was deemed desirable to provide the advanced infantry detachments (making the initial landings) with greater protection from small-arms and light artillery fire by lining the sides of a powered Type A barge with concrete. Wooden slides were also installed along the barge's hull to accommodate ten assault boats (Sturmboote), each capable of carrying six infantrymen and powered by a 30 hp outboard motor. The extra weight of this additional armour and equipment reduced the barge's load capacity to 40 tons. By mid-August, 18 of these craft, designated Type AS, had been converted, and another five were ordered on 30 September.

==== Type AF ====
The Luftwaffe had formed its own special command (Sonderkommando) under Major Fritz Siebel to investigate the production of landing craft for Sea Lion. Major Siebel proposed giving the unpowered Type A barges their own motive power by installing a pair of surplus 600-horsepower (450-kilowatt) BMW aircraft engines, driving propellers. The Kriegsmarine was highly sceptical of this venture, but the Heer (Army) high command enthusiastically embraced the concept and Siebel proceeded with the conversions.

The aircraft engines were mounted on a platform supported by iron scaffolding at the aft end of the vessel. Cooling water was stored in tanks mounted above-deck. As completed, the Type AF had a speed of six knots (11 km/h), and a range of 60 nautical miles (110 kilometres) unless auxiliary fuel tanks were fitted. Disadvantages of this set-up included an inability to back the vessel astern, limited manoeuvrability and the deafening noise of the engines which would have made voice commands problematic.

By 1 October 128 Type A barges had been converted to airscrew propulsion and, by the end of the month, this figure had risen to over 200.

The Kriegsmarine later used some of the motorised Sea Lion barges for landings on the Russian-held Baltic islands in 1941 and, though most of them were eventually returned to the inland rivers they originally plied, a reserve was kept for military transport duties and for filling out amphibious flotillas.

=== Escort ===
As a consequence of employing all of their available cruisers in the North Sea deception operation, there would have been only light forces available to protect the vulnerable transport fleets. The plan revised on 14 September 1940 by Admiral Günther Lütjens called for three groups of five U-boats, all seven destroyers, and seventeen torpedo boats to operate to the west of the mine barrier in the Channel, while two groups of three U-boats and all the available E-boats to operate north of it. Lütjens suggested the inclusion of the old battleships SMS Schlesien and SMS Schleswig-Holstein which were used for training. They were considered too vulnerable to send into action without improvement, especially considering the fate of their sister ship, SMS Pommern, which had blown up at the Battle of Jutland. The Blohm und Voss shipyard considered that it would take six weeks for a minimal upgrade of armour and armament and the idea was dropped, as was a suggestion that they be used as troopships. Four coasters were converted to auxiliary gunboats by the addition of a single 15 cm naval gun and another was fitted with two 10.5 cm guns, while a further twenty-seven smaller vessels were converted into light gunboats by attaching a single ex-French 75 mm field gun to an improvised platform; these were expected to provide naval gunfire support as well as fleet defence against modern British cruisers and destroyers.

== Army ==
=== Panzers ashore ===
Providing armour support for the initial wave of assault troops was a critical concern for Sea Lion planners, and much effort was devoted to finding practical ways of rapidly getting tanks onto the invasion beaches in support of the first echelon. Though the Type A barges could disembark several medium tanks onto an open beach, this could be accomplished only once the tide had fallen further and the barges were firmly grounded along their full length; otherwise, a leading tank might topple off an unsteady ramp and block those behind from deployment. The time needed for assembling the external ramps also meant that both the tanks and the ramp assembly crews would be exposed to close-quarter enemy fire for a considerable time. A safer and faster method was needed, and the Germans eventually settled on providing some tanks with floats and making others fully submersible. It was nevertheless recognised that a high proportion of these specialised tanks might be expected not to make it off the beach.

==== Schwimmpanzer ====
The Schwimmpanzer II Panzer II, at 8.9 tons, was light enough to float with the attachment of long rectangular buoyancy boxes on each side of the tank's hull. The boxes were machined from aluminium stock and filled with Kapok sacks for added buoyancy. Motive power came from the tank's own tracks which were connected by rods to a propeller shaft running through each float. The Schwimmpanzer II could make 5.7 kilometres per hour (3.5 mph) in the water. An inflatable rubber hose around the turret ring created a waterproof seal between the hull and turret. The tank's 2 cm gun and coaxial machinegun were kept operational and could be fired while the tank was still making its way ashore. Because of the great width of the pontoons, Schwimmpanzer IIs were to be deployed from specially-modified Type C landing barges, from which they could be launched directly into open water from a large hatch cut into the stern. The Germans converted 52 of these tanks to amphibious use prior to Sea Lion's cancellation.

==== Tauchpanzer ====
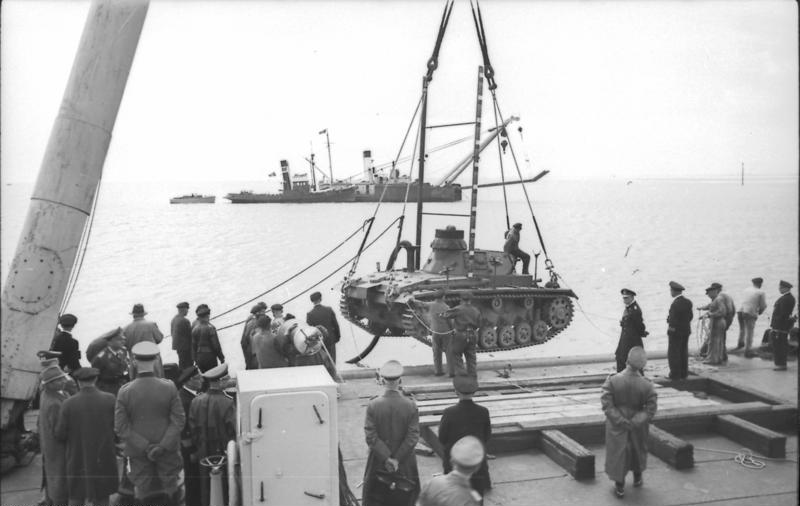
A Panzer III Tauchpanzer under test (1940); the crane ship Viper, which was to support Tauchpanzer operations, is in the background

The Tauchpanzer or deep-wading tank (also referred to as the U-Panzer or Unterwasser Panzer) was a standard Panzer III or Panzer IV medium tank with its hull made completely waterproof by sealing all sighting ports, hatches and air intakes with tape or caulk. The gap between the turret and hull was sealed with an inflatable hose while the main gun mantlet, commander's cupola and radio operator's machine gun were given special rubber coverings. Once the tank reached the shore, all covers and seals could be blown off via explosive cables, enabling normal combat operation.

Fresh air for both the crew and engine was drawn into the tank via an 18 m long rubber hose to which a float was attached to keep one end above the water's surface. A radio antenna was also attached to the float to provide communication between the tank crew and the transport barge. The tank's engine was converted to be cooled with seawater, and the exhaust pipes were fitted with overpressure valves. Any water seeping into the tank's hull could be expelled by an internal bilge pump. Navigation underwater was accomplished using a directional gyrocompass or by following instructions radioed from the transport barge.

Experiments conducted at the end of June and early July at Schilling, near Wilhelmshaven, showed that the submersible tanks functioned best when they were kept moving along the seabed as, if halted for any reason, they tended to sink into the seabed and remain stuck there. Obstacles such as underwater trenches or large rocks tended to stop the tanks in their tracks, and it was decided for this reason that they should be landed at high tide so that any mired tanks could be retrieved at low tide. Submersible tanks could operate in water up to a depth of 15 metres (49 ft).

The Kriegsmarine initially expected to use 50 specially-converted motor coasters to transport the submersible tanks, but testing with the coaster Germania showed this to be impractical. This was due to the ballast needed to offset the weight of the tanks, and the requirement that the coasters be grounded to prevent them from capsizing as the tanks were transferred by crane onto the vessel's wooden side ramps. These difficulties led to development of the Type B barge.

By the end of August the Germans had converted 160 Panzer IIIs, 42 Panzer IVs, and 52 Panzer IIs to amphibious use. This gave them a paper strength of 254 machines, about an equivalent number to those that would otherwise have been allocated to an armoured division. The tanks were divided into four battalions or detachments labelled Panzer-Abteilung A, B, C and D. They were to carry sufficient fuel and ammunition for a combat radius of 200 kilometres (120 mi).

=== Specialised landing equipment ===
As part of a Kriegsmarine competition, prototypes for a prefabricated "heavy landing bridge" or jetty (similar in function to later Allied Mulberry Harbours) were designed and built by Krupp Stahlbau and Dortmunder Union and successfully overwintered in the North Sea in 1941–42. Krupp's design won out, as it only required one day to install, as opposed to twenty-eight days for the Dortmunder Union bridge. The Krupp bridge consisted of a series of 32m-long connecting platforms, each supported on the seabed by four steel columns. The platforms could be raised or lowered by heavy-duty winches in order to accommodate the tide. The German Navy initially ordered eight complete Krupp units composed of six platforms each. This was reduced to six units by the autumn of 1941, and eventually cancelled altogether when it became apparent that Sea Lion would never take place.

In mid-1942, both the Krupp and Dortmunder prototypes were shipped to the Channel Islands and installed together off Alderney, where they were used for unloading materials needed to fortify the island. Referred to as the "German jetty" by local inhabitants, they remained standing for the next thirty-six years until demolition crews finally removed them in 1978–79, a testament to their durability.

The German Army developed a portable landing bridge of its own nicknamed Seeschlange (Sea Snake). This "floating roadway" was formed from a series of joined modules that could be towed into place to act as a temporary jetty. Moored ships could then either unload their cargo directly onto the roadbed or lower it down onto waiting vehicles via their heavy-duty booms. The Seeschlange was successfully tested by the Army Training Unit at Le Havre in France in the autumn of 1941 and later chosen for use in Operation Herkules, the proposed Italo-German invasion of Malta. It was easily transportable by rail.

A specialised vehicle intended for Sea Lion was the Landwasserschlepper (LWS), an amphibious tractor under development since 1935. It was originally intended for use by Army engineers to assist with river crossings. Three of them were assigned to Tank Detachment 100 as part of the invasion; it was intended to use them for pulling ashore unpowered assault barges and towing vehicles across the beaches. They would also have been used to carry supplies directly ashore during the six hours of falling tide when the barges were grounded. This involved towing a Kässbohrer amphibious trailer capable of transporting 10–20 tons of freight behind the LWS. The LWS was demonstrated to General Halder on 2 August 1940 by the Reinhardt Trials Staff on the island of Sylt and, though he was critical of its high silhouette on land, he recognised the overall usefulness of the design. It was proposed to build enough tractors that one or two could be assigned to each invasion barge, but the late date and difficulties in mass-producing the vehicle prevented this.

=== Other equipment to be used for the first time ===
Operation Sea Lion would have been the first ever amphibious invasion by a mechanised army, and the largest amphibious invasion since Gallipoli. The Germans had to invent and improvise much of equipment to be used, also proposing to use some new weapons and use upgrades of their existing equipment for the first time. These included:

1. New antitank guns and ammunition. The standard German antitank gun, the 37 mm Pak 36, was capable of penetrating the armour of all 1940 British tanks except the Matilda and Valentine. Armour-piercing ballistic capped (tungsten-cored) ammunition (Pzgr. 40) for 37 mm Pak 36 had become available in time for the invasion. The 37 mm Pzgr.40 would still have had trouble penetrating the Matilda II's armour so the first echelon units replaced theirs with French or Czechoslovak 47 mm guns (which weren't much better). The Pak 36 began to be replaced by the 50 mm Pak 38 in mid-1940. The Pak 38, which could penetrate a Matilda's armour, would probably have seen action first with Sea Lion as it would have been issued initially to the Waffen-SS and the Heer's elite units, and all those units were in the Sea Lion force. These included the SS Leibstandarte Adolf Hitler regiment, the Großdeutschland regiment, 2 mountain, 2 Jäger, 2 Fallschirmjäger, 4 panzer, and 2 motorised divisions. In addition, the 7th Infantry division was considered one of the best in the Heer, and the 35th almost as good.
2. Captured French armoured tractors. The use of these tractors by the first wave units was intended to reduce their dependence upon horses and probably would have reduced the problems of getting supplies off the beaches. In addition to their proposed use on the beaches, the Germans later used them as tractors for antitank guns and munitions carriers, as self-propelled guns, and as armoured personnel carriers. There were two main types. The Renault UE Chenillette (German name: Infanterie Schlepper UE 630 (f)) was a light tracked armoured carrier and prime mover produced by France between 1932 and 1940. Five to six thousand were built, and about 3,000 were captured and overhauled by the Germans. They had a storage compartment that could carry 350 kg, pull a trailer weighing 775 kg for a total of about 1000 kg, and could climb a 50% slope. The armour was 5–9 mm, enough to stop shell fragments and bullets. There was also the Lorraine 37L, which was larger, of which 360 fell into German hands. In that vehicle a load of 810 kilograms could be carried, plus a 690 kg trailer pulled for a total of 1.5 tonnes. The use of such captured equipment meant that the first wave divisions were largely motorised, with the first wave using 9.3% (4,200) of the 45,000 horses normally required.
3. 48× Stug III Ausf B Assault Guns – 7.5 cm StuK 37 L/24, 50 mm armour and improved suspension. Some were to be landed with the first wave.
4. Panzer III F/G upgraded with more armour on the mantlet and progressively from 3.7 cm KwK 36 L/46.5 to 5 cm KwK 38 L/42.
5. 72 Nebelwerfer, to be landed with the second and third waves.
6. 36× Flammpanzer II flamethrower tanks, 20 to land with the first wave.
7. 4 or more 75 mm Leichtgeschütz 40 recoilless guns, for use by paratroopers. The LG 40 could be split into four parts with each part being dropped on a single parachute.

== Broad versus narrow front ==
The German Army High Command (Oberkommando des Heeres, OKH) originally planned an invasion on a vast scale, envisioning landing over forty divisions from Dorset to Kent. This was far in excess of what the Kriegsmarine could supply, and the final plans were more modest, calling for nine divisions to make an amphibious assault on Sussex and Kent with around 67,000 men in the first echelon and a single airborne division of 3,000 men to support them. The chosen invasion sites ran from Rottingdean in the west to Hythe in the east.

The Kriegsmarine wanted the front to be as short as possible, as it regarded this as more defensible. Admiral Raeder wanted a front stretching from Dover to Eastbourne and stressed that shipping between Cherbourg/Le Havre and Dorset would be exposed to attacks from the Royal Navy based in Portsmouth and Plymouth. General Halder rejected this: "From the army's point of view I regard it as complete suicide, I might just as well put the troops that have landed straight through the sausage machine".

One complication was the tidal flow in the English Channel, where high water moves from west to east, with high water at Lyme Regis occurring around six hours before it reaches Dover. If all the landings were to be made at high water across a broad front, they would have to be made at different times along different parts of the coast, with the landings in Dover being made six hours after any landings in Dorset and thus losing the element of surprise. If the landings were to be made at the same time, methods would have to be devised to disembark men, vehicles and supplies at all states of the tide. That was another reason to favour landing craft.

== German coastal guns ==
With Germany's occupation of the Pas-de-Calais region in northern France, the possibility of closing the Strait of Dover to Royal Navy warships and merchant convoys by the use of land-based heavy artillery became readily apparent, both to the German High Command and to Hitler. Even the Kriegsmarine's Naval Operations Office deemed this a plausible and desirable goal, especially given the relatively short distance, 34 km (21 mi), between the French and English coasts. Orders were therefore issued to assemble and begin emplacing every Army and Navy heavy artillery piece available along the French coast, primarily at Pas-de-Calais. This work was assigned to the Organisation Todt and commenced on 22 July 1940.

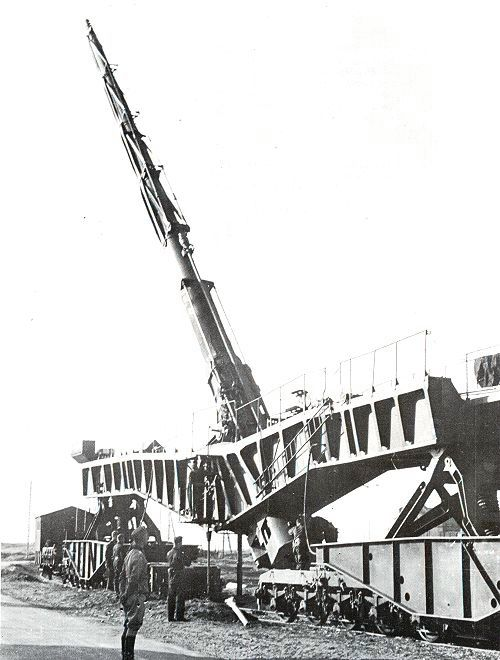
The huge 21 cm K12 railway gun was only suitable for bombarding targets on land.

By early August, four 28 cm (11 in) traversing turrets were fully operational as were all of the Army's railway guns. Seven of these weapons, six 28 cm K5 pieces and a single 21 cm (8.3 in) K12 gun with a range of 115 km (71 mi), could only be used against land targets. The remainder, thirteen 28 cm and five 24 cm (9.4 in) pieces, plus additional motorised batteries comprising twelve 24 cm guns and ten 21 cm weapons, could be fired at shipping but were of limited effectiveness due to their slow traverse speed, long loading time and ammunition types.

Better suited for use against naval targets were the four heavy naval batteries installed by mid-September: Friedrich August with three 30.5 cm (12.0 in) barrels; Prinz Heinrich with two 28 cm guns; Oldenburg with two 24 cm weapons and, largest of all, Siegfried (later renamed Batterie Todt) with a pair of 38 cm (15 in) guns. Fire control for these weapons was provided by both spotter aircraft and by DeTeGerät radar sets installed at Blanc Nez and Cap d'Alprech. These units were capable of detecting targets out to a range of 40 km (25 mi), including small British patrol craft inshore of the English coast. Two additional radar sites were added by mid-September: a DeTeGerät at Cap de la Hague and a FernDeTeGerät long-range radar at Cap d'Antifer near Le Havre.

To strengthen German control of the Channel narrows, the Army planned to quickly establish mobile artillery batteries along the English shoreline once a beachhead had been firmly established. Towards that end, 16th Army's Artillerie Kommando 106 was slated to land with the second wave to provide fire protection for the transport fleet as early as possible. This unit consisted of twenty-four 15 cm (5.9 in) and seventy-two 10 cm (3.9 in) guns. About one third of them were to be deployed on English soil by the end of Sea Lion's first week.

The presence of these batteries was expected to greatly reduce the threat posed by British destroyers and smaller craft along the eastern approaches as the guns would be sited to cover the main transport routes from Dover to Calais and Hastings to Boulogne. They could not entirely protect the western approaches, but a large area of those invasion zones would still be within effective range.

The British military was well aware of the dangers posed by German artillery dominating the Dover Strait and on 4 September 1940 the Chief of Naval Staff issued a memo stating that if the Germans "…could get possession of the Dover defile and capture its gun defences from us, then, holding these points on both sides of the Straits, they would be in a position largely to deny those waters to our naval forces". Should the Dover defile be lost, he concluded, the Royal Navy could do little to interrupt the flow of German supplies and reinforcements across the Channel, at least by day, and he further warned that "…there might really be a chance that they (the Germans) might be able to bring a serious weight of attack to bear on this country". The very next day the Chiefs of Staff, after discussing the importance of the defile, decided to reinforce the Dover coast with more ground troops.

The guns started to fire in the second week of August 1940 and were not silenced until 1944, when the batteries were overrun by Allied ground forces. They caused 3,059 alerts, 216 civilian deaths, and damage to 10,056 premises in the Dover area. However, despite firing on frequent slow moving coastal convoys, often in broad daylight, for almost the whole of that period (there was an interlude in 1943), only one seaman was killed, though others were injured by shell splinters from near misses. Furthermore, 2 transports were sunk by them. Whatever the perceived risk, this lack of ability to hit any moving ship did not support the contention that the German coastal batteries would have been a serious threat to fast destroyers or smaller warships. This made them a threat only to landing forces at close range.

== Indefinite postponement ==
During the summer of 1940, both the British public and the Americans believed that a German invasion was imminent, and they studied the forthcoming high tides of 5–9 August, 2–7 September, 1–6 October, and 30 October – 4 November as likely dates. The British prepared extensive defences, and, in Churchill's view, "the great invasion scare" was "serving a most useful purpose" by "keeping every man and woman tuned to a high pitch of readiness". He did not think the threat credible. On 10 July, he advised the War Cabinet that the possibility of invasion could be ignored, as it "would be a most hazardous and suicidal operation"; and on 13 August that "now that we were so much stronger", he thought "we could spare an armoured brigade from this country". Over-riding General Dill, Churchill initiated Operation Apology by which a series of troop convoys, including three tank regiments and eventually the entire 2nd Armoured Division, were sent around the Cape of Good Hope to reinforce General Wavell in the Middle East in support of operations against Italian colonial forces (Italy had declared war on 10 June). Furthermore, on Churchill's urging, on 5 August the War Cabinet approved Operation Menace, in which a substantial proportion of the Home Fleet – two battleships, an aircraft carrier, five cruisers, and twelve destroyers, together with five out of six battalions of Royal Marines, were dispatched to Dakar on 30 August in an attempt to neutralise the battleship Richelieu and detach French West Africa from Vichy France to the control of the Free French. Overall, these actions demonstrated Churchill's confidence that the immediate danger of a German invasion was now over.

The Germans were confident enough to film a simulation of the intended invasion in advance. A crew turned up at the Belgian port of Antwerp in early September 1940 and, for two days, they filmed tanks and troops landing from barges on a nearby beach under simulated fire. It was explained that, as the invasion would happen at night, Hitler wanted the German people to see all the details.

In early August, the German command had agreed that the invasion should begin on 15 September, but the Navy's revisions to its schedule set the date back to 20 September. At a conference on 14 September, Hitler praised the various preparations, but told his service chiefs that, as air superiority had still not been achieved, he would review whether to proceed with the invasion. At this conference, he gave the Luftwaffe the opportunity to act independently of the other services, with intensified continuous air attacks to overcome British resistance; on 16 September, Göring issued orders for this new phase of the air attack. On 17 September 1940, Hitler held a meeting with Reichsmarschall Hermann Göring and Generalfeldmarschall Gerd von Rundstedt during which he became convinced the operation was not viable. Control of the skies was still lacking, and co-ordination among three branches of the armed forces was out of the question. Later that day, Hitler ordered the postponement of the operation. He ordered the dispersal of the invasion fleet in order to avert further damage by British air and naval attacks.

The postponement coincided with rumours that there had been an attempt to land on British shores on or about 7 September, which had been repulsed with large German casualties. The story was later expanded to include false reports that the British had set the sea on fire using flaming oil. Both versions were widely reported in the American press and in William L. Shirer's Berlin Diary, but both were officially denied by Britain and Germany. Author James Hayward has suggested that the whispering campaign around the "failed invasion" was a successful example of British black propaganda to bolster morale at home and in occupied Europe, and convince America that Britain was not a lost cause.

On 12 October 1940, Hitler issued a directive releasing forces for other fronts. The appearance of preparations for Sea Lion was to be continued to keep political pressure on Britain, and a fresh directive would be issued if it was decided that invasion was to be reconsidered in the spring of 1941. On 12 November 1940, Hitler issued Directive No. 18 demanding further refinement to the invasion plan. On 1 May 1941, fresh invasion orders were issued under the codename Haifische (shark), accompanied by additional landings on the southwest and northeast coasts of England codenamed Harpune Nord and Harpune Süd (harpoon north and south), although commanders of naval stations were informed that these were deception plans. Work continued on the various amphibious warfare developments such as purpose-built landing craft, which were later employed in operations in the Baltic.

While the bombing of Britain intensified during the Blitz, Hitler issued his Directive No. 21 on 18 December 1940 instructing the Wehrmacht to be ready for a quick attack to commence his long planned invasion of the Soviet Union. Seelöwe lapsed, never to be resumed. On 23 September 1941, Hitler ordered all Sea Lion preparations to cease, but it was 1942 before the last of the barges at Antwerp were returned to trade. Hitler's last recorded order with reference to Sea Lion was on 24 January 1944, reusing equipment that was still stockpiled for the invasion and stating that twelve months' notice would be given of its resumption.

== Chances of success ==
Göring, Commander-in-Chief of the Luftwaffe, believed the invasion could not succeed and doubted whether the German air force would be able to win unchallenged control of the skies; nevertheless, he hoped that an early victory in the Battle of Britain would force the UK government to negotiate, without any need for an invasion. As early as July 1939, Schmid, the Luftwaffe's intelligence chief, had concluded that air attack alone could not defeat Britain and a land invasion would be required. Adolf Galland, who became commander of Luftwaffe fighters later in the war, claimed invasion plans were not serious and that there was a palpable sense of relief in the Wehrmacht when it was finally called off. Rundstedt also took this view and thought that Hitler never seriously intended to invade Britain; he was convinced that the whole thing was a bluff to put pressure on the British government to come to terms following the Fall of France. He observed that Napoleon had failed to invade and the difficulties that confounded him did not appear to have been solved by the Sea Lion planners. In fact, in November 1939, the German naval staff produced a study on the possibility of an invasion of Britain and concluded that it required two preconditions, air and naval superiority, neither of which Germany ever had. Dönitz believed air superiority was not enough and admitted, "We possessed neither control of the air or the sea; nor were we in any position to gain it." Raeder thought it would be impossible for Germany to attempt an invasion until the spring of 1941; he instead called for Malta and the Suez Canal to be overrun so German forces could link up with Japanese forces in the Indian Ocean to bring about the collapse of the British Empire in the Far East, and prevent the Americans from being able to use British bases if the United States entered the war.

As early as 14 August 1940, Hitler had told his generals that he would not attempt to invade Britain if the task seemed too dangerous, before adding that there were other ways of defeating the UK than invading.

In his history of World War II, Churchill stated, "Had the Germans possessed in 1940 well trained [and equipped] amphibious forces their task would still have been a forlorn hope in the face of our sea and air power. In fact, they had neither the tools or the training". He added, "There were indeed some who on purely technical grounds, and for the sake of the effect the total defeat of his expedition would have on the general war, were quite content to see him try."

Although Operation Sea Lion was never attempted, there has been much speculation about its hypothetical outcome. The great majority of military historians, including Peter Fleming, Derek Robinson and Stephen Bungay, have expressed the opinion that it had little chance of success and would have most likely resulted in a disaster for the Germans. Fleming states it is doubtful whether history offers any better example of a victor so nearly offering his vanquished foe an opportunity of inflicting on him a resounding defeat. Len Deighton and some other writers have called the German amphibious plans a "Dunkirk in reverse". Robinson argues the massive superiority of the Royal Navy over the Kriegsmarine would have made Sea Lion a disaster. Andrew Gordon, in an article for the Royal United Services Institute Journal agrees with this and is clear in his conclusion the German Navy was never in a position to mount Sealion, regardless of any realistic outcome of the Battle of Britain. In his fictional alternate history Invasion: the German invasion of England, July 1940, Kenneth Macksey proposes that the Germans might have succeeded if they had swiftly and decisively begun preparations even before the Dunkirk evacuations, and the Royal Navy for some reason had held back from large-scale intervention, though in practice the Germans were unprepared for such a speedy commencement of their assault. The German official naval war historian, Vice Admiral Kurt Assmann, wrote in 1958: "Had the German Air Force defeated the Royal Air Force as decisively as it had defeated the French Air Force a few months earlier, I am sure Hitler would have given the order for the invasion to be launched – and the invasion would in all probability have been smashed".

An alternative, and very much a minority, perspective was advanced in 2016 by Robert Forczyk in We march against England. Forczyk claims to apply a much more realistic assessment of the relative strengths and weaknesses of both German and British forces, and challenges the views advanced by previous writers that the Royal Navy might easily have overwhelmed the German naval units protecting the first wave invasion fleet. His assessment concurs with that emerging from the 1974 Sandhurst Sea Lion wargame (see below) that the first wave would likely have crossed the Channel and established a lodgement around the landing beaches in Kent and East Sussex without major loss, and that the defending British forces would have been unlikely to have dislodged them once ashore. He proposes though, that the westernmost German landing at beach 'E' could not have been sustained for long against counterattacking British ground, naval and air forces, and that accordingly these German units would have had to fight their way eastwards, abandoning any aspiration to hold Newhaven. In the absence of access to a major port and with continued losses of German troop transport vessels from submarine attack, Forczyk argues that proposed arrangements for landing the second wave onto the beaches would have been wholly impractical once autumn and winter weather set into the Channel, so the first wave would be stranded in Kent as a 'beached whale' without substantial armour, transport or heavy artillery – unable to break out and threaten London. Nevertheless, Forczyk does not accept that they would necessarily have surrendered, pointing to the determined resistance of surrounded German forces at Stalingrad and Demyansk. He suggests they could possibly have held on into 1941, sustained by a small-ship fast night-time resupply operation into Folkestone (and maybe Dover), holding the possibility of negotiating their withdrawal in Spring 1941 under a truce agreed with the British government.

=== Logistics ===
Four years later, the Allied D-Day landings showed just how much materiel had to be landed continuously to maintain an amphibious invasion. The problem for the Germans was worse, as the German Army, despite the success of the blitzkrieg and German propaganda, was still mostly horse-drawn. One of its prime headaches would have been transporting thousands of horses across the Channel. British intelligence calculated that the first wave of 10 divisions (including the airborne division) would require a daily average of 3,300 tons of supplies. In fact, in Russia in 1941, when engaged in heavy fighting (at the end of a very long supply line), a single German infantry division required up to 1,100 tons of supplies a day, though a more usual figure would be 212–425 tons per day. The smaller figure is more likely due to the very short distances the supplies would have to travel. Rations for two weeks were to be provided to the German troops of the first wave because the armies had been instructed to live off the land as far as possible in order to minimise supply across the Channel during the initial phase of the battle. British intelligence further calculated that Folkestone, the largest harbour falling within the planned German landing zones, could handle 150 tons per day in the first week of the invasion (assuming all dockside equipment was successfully demolished and regular RAF bombing raids reduced capacity by 50%). Within seven days, maximum capacity was expected to rise to 600 tons per day, once German shore parties had made repairs to the quays and cleared the harbour of any blockships and other obstacles. This meant that, at best, the nine German infantry and one airborne division landed in the first wave would receive less than 20% of the 3,300 tons of supplies they required each day through a port and would have to rely heavily on whatever could be brought in directly over the beaches or air-lifted into captured airstrips.

The successful capture of Dover and its harbour facilities might have been expected to add another 800 tons per day, raising to 40% the quantity of supplies brought in through ports. However, this rested on the rather unrealistic assumption of little or no interference from the Royal Navy and RAF with the German supply convoys which would have been made up of underpowered (or unpowered, i.e., towed) inland waterways vessels as they shuttled slowly between the Continent to the invasion beaches and any captured harbours.

=== Weather ===
From 19 to 26 September 1940, sea and wind conditions on and over the Channel where the invasion was to take place were good overall, and a crossing, even using converted river barges, was feasible provided the sea state remained at less than 4, which for the most part it did. Winds for the remainder of the month were rated as "moderate" and would not have prevented the German invasion fleet from successfully depositing the first wave troops ashore during the ten days needed to accomplish this. From the night of 27 September, strong northerly winds prevailed, making passage more hazardous, but calm conditions returned on 11–12 October and again on 16–20 October. After that, light easterly winds prevailed which would have assisted any invasion craft travelling from the Continent towards the invasion beaches. But by the end of October, according to British Air Ministry records, very strong south-west winds (force 8) would have prohibited any non-seagoing craft from risking a Channel crossing.

=== German intelligence ===
At least 20 spies were sent to Britain by boat or parachute to gather information on the British coastal defences under the codename "Operation Lena"; many of the agents spoke limited English. All agents were quickly captured, and many were convinced to defect by MI5's Double-Cross System, providing disinformation to their German superiors. It has been suggested that the "amateurish" espionage efforts were a result of deliberate sabotage by the head of the army intelligence bureau in Hamburg, Herbert Wichmann, in an effort to prevent a disastrous and costly amphibious invasion; Wichmann was critical of the Nazi regime and had close ties to Wilhelm Canaris, the head of the Abwehr, the German military intelligence agency.

While some errors might not have caused problems, others, such as the inclusion of bridges that no longer existed and misunderstanding the usefulness of minor British roads, would have been detrimental to German operations, and would have added to the confusion caused by the layout of Britain's cities (with their maze of narrow roads and alleys) and the removal of road signs.

=== Post-war wargaming of the plan ===
A 1974 wargame was conducted at Royal Military Academy Sandhurst. The controllers of the game assumed that the Luftwaffe had not diverted its daytime operations into bombing London on 7 September 1940, but had continued its assault against RAF airbases in the Southeast. Consequently, the German High Command, relying on grossly overstated claims of RAF fighters shot down, were under the erroneous impression that by 19 September RAF front-line fighter strength had fallen to 140 (as against a true figure of over 700); and hence that effective German air superiority might shortly be achieved. In the Game, the Germans were able to land almost all their first echelon forces on 22 September 1940, and established a beachhead in south-east England, capturing Folkestone, and Newhaven, even though the British had demolished the facilities of both ports. The British army forces, delayed in moving units from East Anglia to the Southeast by bomb damage to the rail network south of London, were nevertheless able to hold onto positions in and around Newhaven and Dover, sufficient to deny their use by German forces. Both the RAF and the Luftwaffe lost nearly a quarter of their available forces on the first day, after which it finally became apparent to the German command that British airpower was not, after all, on the point of collapse. On the night of 23/24 September a Royal Navy force of cruisers and destroyers was able to reach the Channel from Rosyth, in time to intercept and destroy most of the barges carrying the second and third echelon of German amphibious landings with the crucial tanks and heavy artillery (for the game, these follow-up echelons had been held back from crossing the Channel on S minus one with the first echelon, instead sailing across on the night of S plus one). Without the second and third echelons, the forces ashore were cut off from reserves of artillery, vehicles, fuel and ammunition supplies; and blocked from further reinforcements. Isolated and facing fresh regular troops with armour and artillery, the invasion force was forced to surrender after six days.

== Planned occupation of Britain ==
=== Future role of Britain ===
One of the primary German foreign policy aims throughout the 1930s had been to establish a military alliance with the United Kingdom, and despite anti-British policies having been adopted as this proved impossible, hope remained that the UK would in time yet become a reliable German ally. Hitler professed an admiration for the British Empire and preferred to see it preserved as a world power, mostly because its break-up would benefit other countries far more than it would Germany, particularly the United States and Japan. Britain's situation was likened to the historical situation of the Austrian Empire after its defeat by the Kingdom of Prussia in 1866, after which Austria was formally excluded from German affairs but would prove to become a loyal ally of the German Empire in the pre-World War I power alignments in Europe. It was hoped that a defeated Britain would fulfil a similar role, being excluded from continental affairs, but maintaining its Empire and becoming an allied seafaring partner of the Germans.

The continued military actions against the UK after the fall of France had the strategic goal of making Britain 'see the light' and conduct an armistice with the Axis powers, with 1 July 1940 being named the "probable date" for the cessation of hostilities. On 21 May 1940, after a consultation with Hitler on the war aims regarding Britain, Halder wrote in his diary: "We are seeking contact with Britain on the basis of partitioning the world". Even as the war went on Hitler hoped in August 1941 for the eventual day when "England and Germany [march] together against America", and in January 1942 he still daydreamed that it was "not impossible" for Britain to quit the war and join the Axis side. Nazi ideologist Alfred Rosenberg hoped that after the victorious conclusion of the war against the USSR, Englishmen would be among the Germanic nationalities who would join the Germanic settlers in colonising the conquered eastern territories.

Other officials called for harsher treatment of the British population. According to captured German documents, the commander-in-chief of the German Army, Walter von Brauchitsch, directed that "The able-bodied male population between the ages of 17 and 45 will, unless the local situation calls for an exceptional ruling, be interned and dispatched to the Continent". The remaining population would have been terrorised, including civilian hostages being taken and the death penalty immediately imposed for even the most trivial acts of resistance, with the UK being plundered for anything of financial, military, industrial or cultural value. After the war, Otto Bräutigam of the Reich Ministry for the Occupied Eastern Territories wrote in his book that he had encountered a personal report by General Eduard Wagner regarding a discussion with Heinrich Himmler from February 1943, in which Himmler had expressed the intention for Einsatzgruppen to kill about 80% of the populations of France and England after the German victory. At another point, Hitler had on one occasion described the English lower classes as "racially inferior".

=== Administration ===
According to the most detailed plans created for the immediate post-invasion administration, Great Britain and Ireland were to be divided into six military-economic commands, with headquarters in London, Birmingham, Newcastle, Liverpool, Glasgow and Dublin. Hitler decreed that Blenheim Palace, the ancestral home of Winston Churchill, was to serve as the overall headquarters of the German occupation military government. The OKW, RSHA, and Foreign Ministry compiled lists of those they thought could be trusted to form a new German-friendly government along the lines of the one in occupied Norway. The list was headed by British fascist leader Oswald Mosley. The RSHA also felt that Harold Nicolson might prove useful in this role. It appears, based on the German police plans, that the occupation was to be only temporary, as detailed provisions for the post-occupation period are mentioned.

Some sources indicated that the Germans only intended to occupy Southern England, and that draft documents existed on the regulation of the passage of British civilians back and forth between the occupied and unoccupied territories. Others state that Nazi planners envisaged the institution of a nationalities policy in Western Europe to secure German hegemony there, which entailed the granting of independence to various regions. This involved detaching Scotland from the United Kingdom, the creation of a United Ireland, and an autonomous status for Western England.

After the war rumours also emerged about the selection of either Joachim von Ribbentrop or Ernst Wilhelm Bohle, for the "viceregal" office of Reichskommissar für Großbritannien ("Imperial Commissioner for Great Britain"). However, no establishment by this name was ever approved by either Hitler or the Nazi government during the war, and was also denied by Bohle when he was interrogated by the victorious Allies (von Ribbentrop not having been questioned on the matter). After the Second Armistice at Compiègne with France, when he expected an imminent British capitulation, Hitler did however assure Bohle that he would be the next German ambassador to the Court of St. James's "if the British behave[d] sensibly".

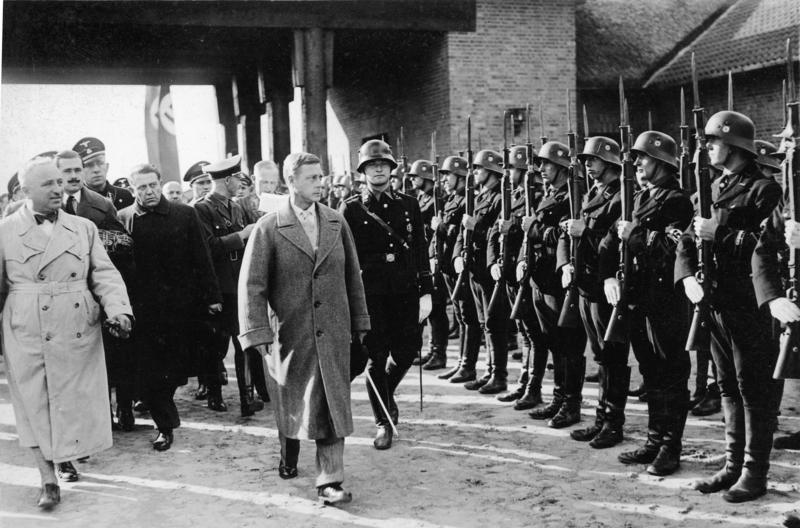
Edward, Duke of Windsor reviewing SS guards with Robert Ley, 1937

The German Government used 90% of James Vincent Murphy's rough draft translation of Mein Kampf to form the body of an edition to be distributed in the UK once Operation Sea Lion was completed. This 'Operation Sea Lion Edition' was finalised and printed in the summer of 1940. Once the invasion was called off by Adolf Hitler most copies were distributed to English speaking POW camps. Original copies are very rare and highly sought after by serious book collectors interested in military history.

=== Duke of Windsor ===
A Channel 5 documentary broadcast on 16 July 2009 repeated the claim that the Germans intended to restore Edward VIII to the throne in the event of a German occupation. Many senior German officials believed the Duke of Windsor to be highly sympathetic to the Nazi government, a feeling that was reinforced by his and Wallis Simpson's 1937 visit to Germany. However, the Foreign Office maintains that despite German approaches; "The Duke never wavered in his loyalty to Great Britain during the war".

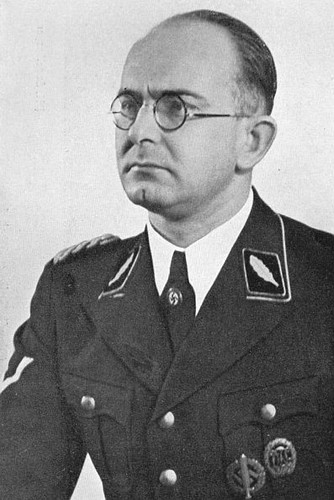
Franz Six in 1940. He was later convicted of war crimes in the Nuremberg trials.

=== The Black Book ===
Had Operation Sea Lion succeeded, Franz Six was intended to become the Sicherheitsdienst (SD) Commander in the country, with his headquarters to be located in London, and with regional task forces in Birmingham, Liverpool, Manchester, and Edinburgh. His immediate mission would have been to hunt down and arrest the 2,820 people on the Sonderfahndungsliste G.B. ("Special Search List Great Britain"). This document, which post-war became known as "The Black Book", was a secret list compiled by Walter Schellenberg containing the names of prominent British residents to be arrested immediately after a successful invasion. Six would also have been responsible for handling the large population of British Jews, over 300,000 at that time.

Six had also been entrusted with the task of securing "aero-technological research result and important equipment" as well as "Germanic works of art". There is also a suggestion that he toyed with the idea of moving Nelson's Column to Berlin. The RSHA planned to take over the Ministry of Information, to close the major news agencies and to take control of all of the newspapers. Anti-German newspapers were to be closed down.

== In popular culture ==
There is a large corpus of works set in an alternative history where the German invasion of Great Britain is attempted or successfully carried out.

== See also ==
- Auxiliary Units, the planned British resistance movement had a German invasion been successful
- British anti-invasion preparations of World War II
- Cross-Channel guns in the Second World War
- Junkers Ju 322 Mammut and Messerschmitt Me 321 Gigant, competing Grossraumlastensegler heavy cargo glider designs for an invasion of the UK
- German occupation of the Channel Islands

== Bibliography ==
- Ansel, Walter (1960). Hitler Confronts England. Duke University Press.
- Bishop, Patrick (2009). Battle of Britain: A Day-by-Day Chronicle 10 July 1940 to 31 October 1940. London: Quercus History. ISBN 978-1-84724-984-5.
- Bungay, Stephen (2000). The Most Dangerous Enemy : A History of the Battle of Britain. London: Aurum Press. ISBN 1-85410-721-6. (hardcover), 2002, ISBN 1-85410-801-8 (paperback).
- Burdick, Charles and Jacobsen, Hans-Adolf. (1988). The Halder War Diary 1939–1942. Novato Press, California. ISBN 1-85367-022-7
- Collier, Basil (1962). The Defence of the United Kingdom (official history). Naval and Miliatary Press.
- Corum, James (1997) The Luftwaffe: Creating the Operational Air War, 1918–1940. Kansas University Press ISBN 978-0-7006-0836-2
- Cox, Richard (1977). Operation Sea Lion. Presidio Press. ISBN 0-89141-015-5
- Deighton, Len (1996). Fighter: The True Story of the Battle of Britain. London: Pimlico. ISBN 0-7126-7423-3. (Originally published: London: Jonathan Cape, 1977.) ISBN 0-7126-7423-3.
- Dönitz, Karl (1997) Ten years and Twenty Days. New York: Da Capo Press. ISBN 0-306-80764-5.
- Evans, Martin Marix (2004). Invasion! Operation Sealion 1940. Pearson Education. ISBN 0-582-77294-X.
- Evans, Martin Marix; Mcgeoch, Angus (2014). Invasion!: Operation Sea Lion, 1940. Taylor & Francis. ISBN 978-1-317-86827-9.
- Fest, Joachim C. (1973). Hitler. Verlagg Ulstein. ISBN 0-15-602754-2.
- Fleming, Peter (1957). Operation Sea Lion. Simon & Schuster. ISBN 0-330-24211-3.
- Forczyk, Robert (2016). We March Against England: Operation Sea Lion 1940–41. Osprey. ISBN 978-1-4728-1485-2.
- Greiner, H. (1979) 'Operation Seelowe and Intensified Air Warfare Against England up to 30 October 1940', in Detweiler, D. World War II German Military Studies, Volume 7 of 24. New York.
- Haining, Peter (2004). Where the Eagle Landed: The Mystery of the German Invasion of Britain, 1940. Robson. ISBN 1-86105-750-4.
- Hewitt, Geoff (2008). Hitler's Armada: The Royal Navy and the Defence of Great Britain, April–October 1940. Pen & Sword Maritime. ISBN 978-1844157853.
- Hewitt, Nick (2008). Coastal Convoys 1939–1945: The Indestructible Highway. Pen & Sword Maritime. ISBN 978-1-84415-861-4.
- Hildebrand, Klaus (1973). The Foreign Policy of the Third Reich. University of California Press. ISBN 978-0-520-02528-8.
- Hooton, E. R. (2010) The Luftwaffe: A Study in Air Power, 1933–1945. Classic Publications, London. ISBN 978-1-906537-18-0
- Kieser, Egbert (1987). Cassell Military Classics: Operation Sea Lion: The German Plan To Invade Britain, 1940. Sterling. ISBN 978-0-304-35208-1.
- Kugler, Randolf (1989). Das Landungswesen in Deutschland seit 1900. Buchzentrum, Empfingen. ISBN 978-3-86755-000-0.
- Larew, Karl. The Royal Navy in the Battle of Britain. The Historian 54:2 (1992: Winter), pp. 243–254
- McKinstry, Leo (2014). Operation Sealion; How Britain crushed the German War Machine's dreams of invasion in 1940. John Murray. ISBN 978-1-84854-704-9.
- Macksey, Kenneth (1980). Invasion: The German Invasion of England, July 1940. MacMillan Publishing Co. ISBN 978-0025780309.
- Murray, Williamson (2002). Strategy for Defeat the Luftwaffe 1933–1945. University Press of the Pacific. ISBN 978-0-89875-797-2.
- Rich, Norman (1974). Hitler's War Aims: The Establishment of the New Order. W.W. Norton & Company. ISBN 978-0-393-33290-2.
- Nicosia, Francis R. (2000). The Third Reich and the Palestine Question. Transaction Publishers. ISBN 978-0-7658-0624-6.
- Overy, Richard (2010). The Battle of Britain : Myth and Reality. London: Penguin. ISBN 978-1-84614-356-4.
- Overy, Richard J. (2013). The Bombing War : Europe 1939–1945. London & New York: Allen Lane. ISBN 978-0-7139-9561-9.
- Parkinson, Roger (1977). Summer, 1940: The Battle of Britain. David McKay Co. ISBN 0-679-50756-6.
- Pinkus, Oscar (2005). The War Aims and Strategies of Adolf Hitler. McFarland. ISBN 0-7864-2054-5.
- Raeder, Erich (2001) Erich Rader, Grand Admiral: The Personal Memoir of the Commander in Chief of the German Navy From 1935 Until His Final Break With Hitler in 1943. New York: Da Capo Press. United States Naval Institute. ISBN 0-306-80962-1.
- Schenk, Peter (1990). Invasion of England 1940: The Planning of Operation Sealion. Conway Maritime Press. ISBN 0-85177-548-9.
- Shirer, William L. (1960). The Rise and Fall of the Third Reich. Simon and Schuster, New York.
- Strobl, Gerwin (2000). The Germanic Isle: Nazi Perceptions of Britain. Cambridge University Press. ISBN 0-521-78265-1 – via Google Books.
- Taylor, Telford (1967). The Breaking Wave: The Second World War in the Summer of 1940. Simon and Schuster.
- Von der Porten, Edward P. (1976). Pictorial History of the German Navy in World War II. Thomas Y. Crowell Co.
