= Krupp K5 =

WW2 German heavy railway gun

Coordinates: 50°48′50″N 1°45′17″E

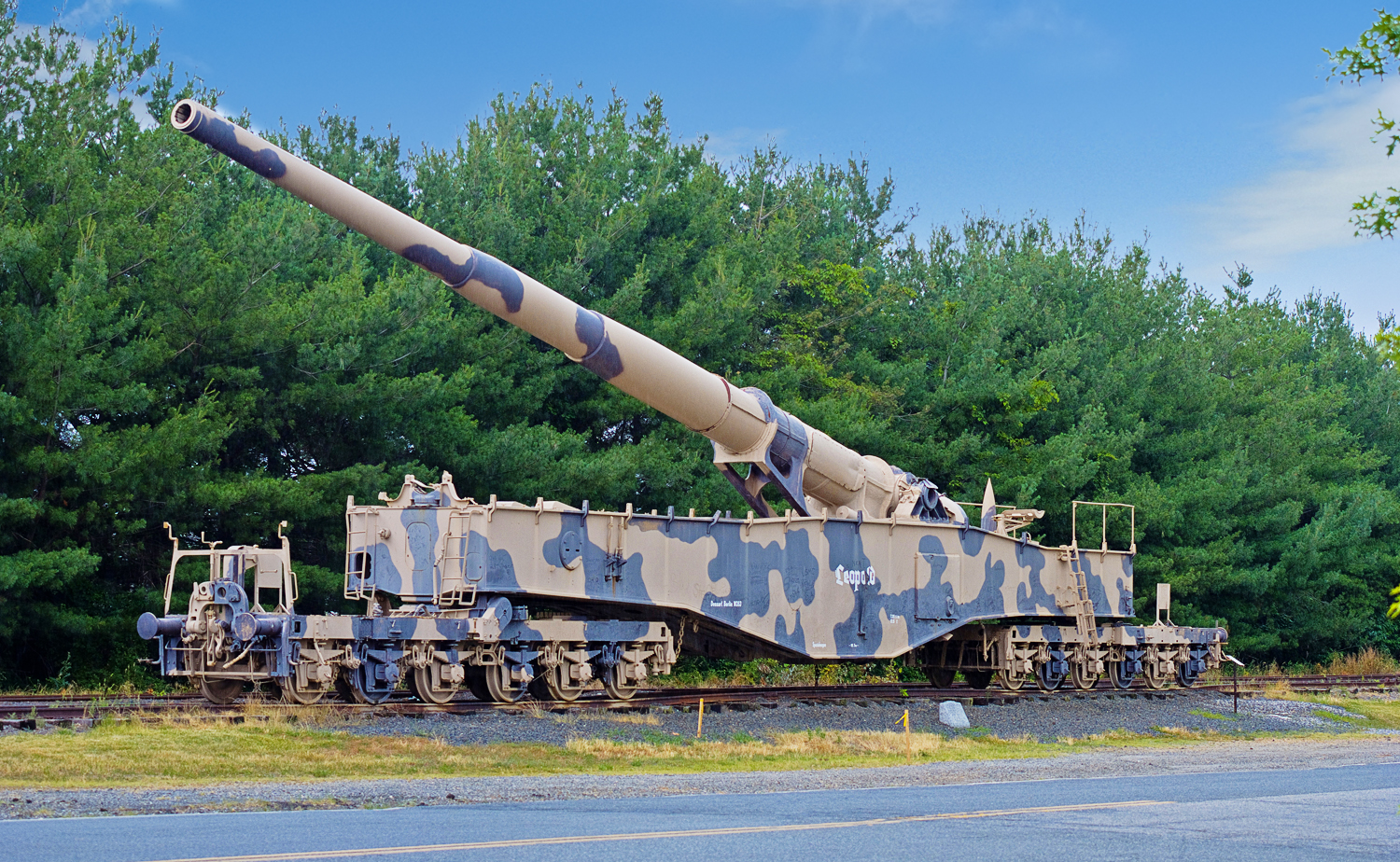
- Krupp K5 "Leopold" in the United States Army Ordnance Museum
- Type: Railway Gun
- Place of origin: Nazi Germany

Service history
- In service: 1940 - 1945
- Used by: Nazi Germany
- Wars: World War II

Production history
- Manufacturer: Krupp
- No. built: 25

Specifications
- Mass: 218 t (215 long tons; 240 short tons); Cannon: 95 t (93 long tons; 105 short tons)
- Length: Travel: 27 m (89 ft); Combat: 26 m (85 ft)
- Barrel length: 25.539 m (83 ft 9 in) L/76.1
- Shell weight: 243 kg (536 lb)
- Caliber: 283 mm (11.1 in)
- Elevation: +50°
- Traverse: 1°
- Rate of fire: 15 rounds per hour
- Muzzle velocity: 1,120 m/s (3,675 ft/s)
- Effective firing range: 64 km (40 mi)
- Maximum firing range: 151 km (94 mi) (Arrow shell)

The Krupp K5 was a heavy railway gun used by Nazi Germany throughout World War II.

== Description ==
Krupp's K5 series were consistent in mounting a 21.5-metre-long (71 ft) gun barrel in a fixed mounting with only adjustable vertical elevation of the weapon. This gondola was then mounted on a pair of 12-wheel bogies designed to be operated on commercial and military rails built to German standards. This mounting permitted only two degrees of horizontal traverse. The carriage had to be aligned on the rails first, with only minimal fine leveling capable once halted. Hence the gun could only fire at targets tangential to an existing railway track.

To track targets needing greater traverse either a curved length of railway was used with the gun shunted backwards or forwards to aim; a cross-track was laid with the front bogie turned perpendicular to the rest of the gun and moved up and down the cross-track to train the weapon; or for 360 degree traverse, the "Vögele Turntable" could be constructed, consisting of a raised rail section (the "firing bed") carrying the gun, running on a circular track with a central jack to raise the gun during traverse and to take some of the enormous weight.

The main barrel of the K5 is 283 mm (11.1 in) in calibre, and is rifled with twelve 7 mm (0.28 in) grooves. These were originally 10 mm (0.39 in) deep, but were made shallower to rectify cracking problems.

== History ==
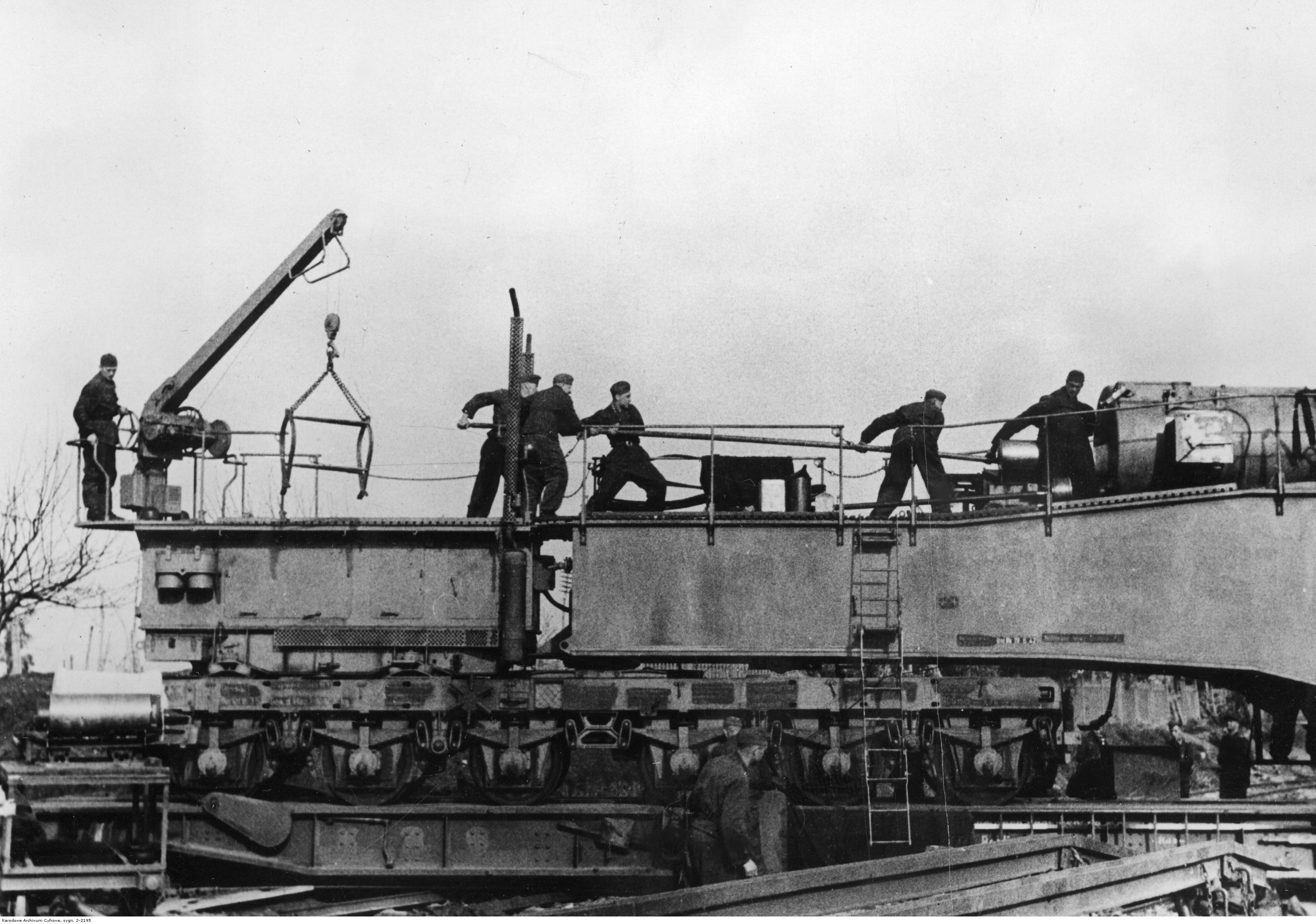
One of the K5 guns at Anzio being loaded by its crew, May 1944.

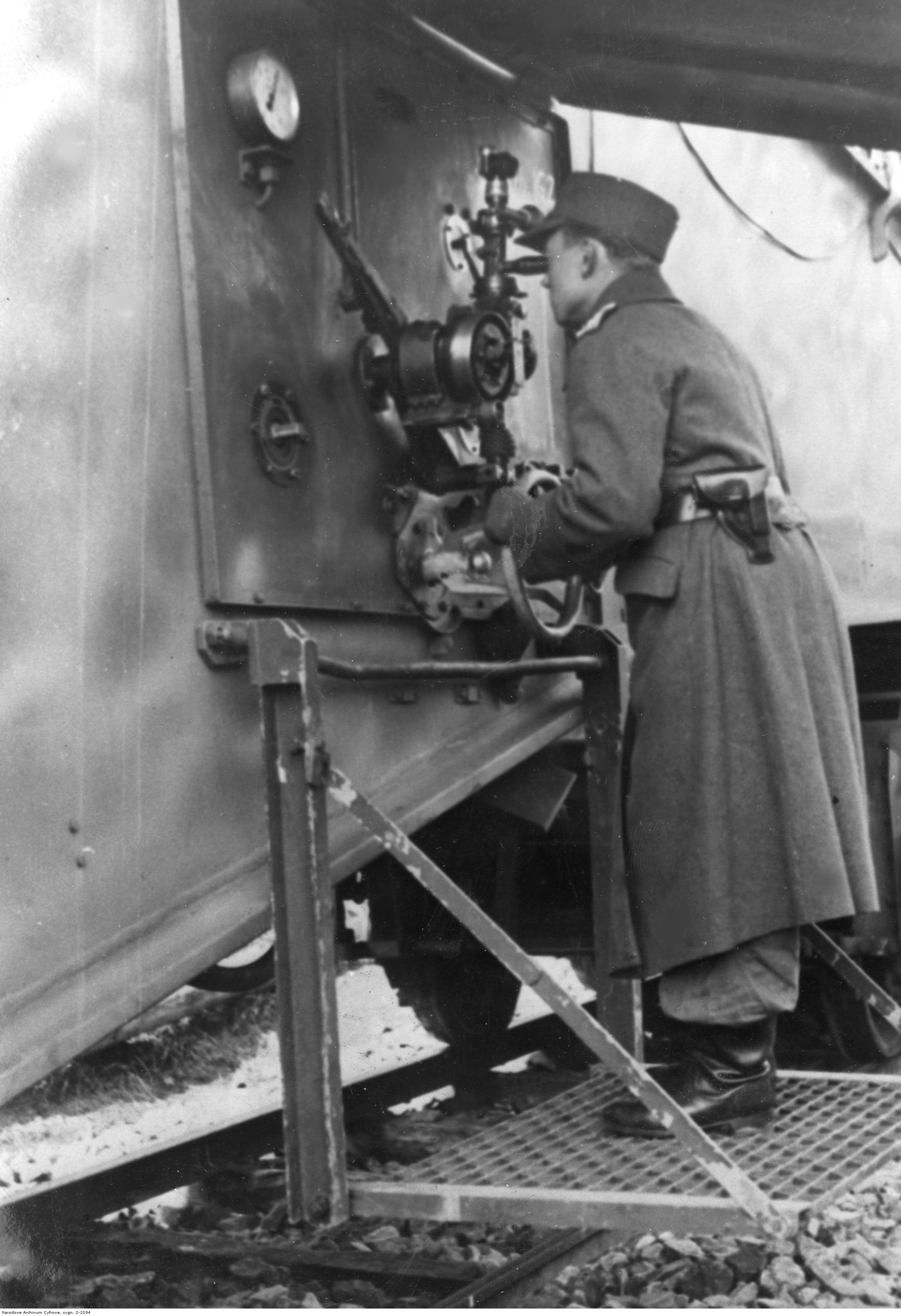
An artilleryman aims one of the K5 guns at Anzio, May 1944.

K5 development began in 1934 with first testing following in 1936 at Darlowo (German: Schießplatz Rügenwalde-Bad) in the former Farther Pomerania at the South coast of the Baltic Sea. Initial tests were done with a 150 mm barrel under the designation K5M.

Production led to eight guns being in service for the Invasion of France, although problems were encountered with barrel splitting and rectified with changes to the rifling. The guns were then reliable until the end of the war, under the designation K5 Tiefzug 7 mm. Three were installed on the English Channel coast and were intended to target British shipping in the Channel, but proved unsuccessful.

Two K5 guns, named Robert and Leopold by German crews, were shipped to Italy to help counter the Allied landing at the town of Anzio in February 1944. The Allied soldiers stuck on the beach nicknamed the two German guns "Anzio Annie" and "Anzio Express" due to the express train-like sound the shells generated. On 18 May 1944 the guns fired off their remaining ammunition and then escaped along the coastal railroad into the rail yard in Civitavecchia, in preparation for evacuation. This proved impossible and the guns were destroyed by their crews.

Towards the end of the war, longer-range rocket-assisted projectiles were successfully fired from the K5Vz.

A final experiment was to bore out two of the weapons to 310 mm (12.2 in) smoothbore to allow firing of the Peenemünder Pfeilgeschosse arrow shells. These were designated K5 Glatt. It is not clear if they were ever used in combat.

Other proposals to modify or create new models of the K5 never saw production, including one that could leave the railway with modified Tiger II tank chassis replacing the two railroad bogies. This project ended with the defeat of Nazi Germany.

== Projectiles ==
Two types of high-explosive projectile were used with the K5. The 28cm G35 weighed 255 kilograms (562 lb) and contained a charge of 30.5 kilograms (67 lb) of TNT. The 28cm Gr.39 m. Hbgr. Z. was slightly heavier, weighing 265 kilograms (584 lb) and containing around 44.5 kilograms (98 lb) of TNT. These projectiles were pre-rifled with angled splines along their midsection which were aligned with the guns rifling before firing.

The rocket-assisted projectile was known as the 28cm R. GR.4351. This carried 14 kilograms (31 lb) of explosive and was boosted by around 20 kilograms (40 lb) of double-base powder rocket propellant. The total weight was 248 kilograms (547 lb). 19 seconds after firing the rocket motor was ignited and the projectile was accelerated through the stratosphere. When the rocket burnt out, the center section containing the rocket motor fell away and the projectile continued on its course. The maximum range for this projectile was 86 km (53 mi), but, due to the weight of the rocket motor, the projectile carried less explosives.

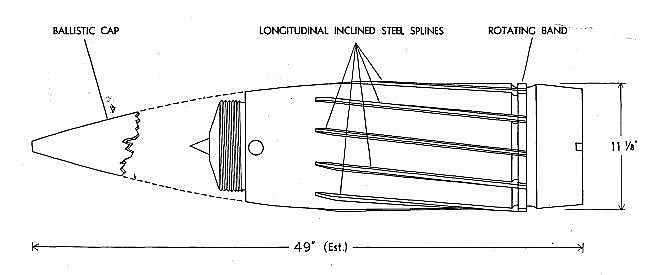
The pre-rifled 28 cm projectile

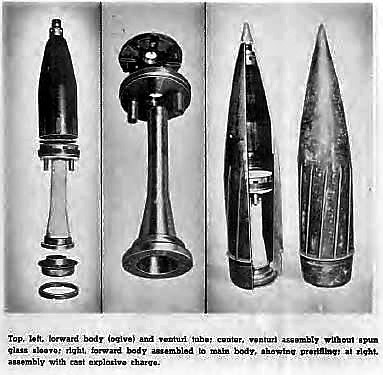
A diagram of the major components of the rocket-assisted projectile (left) and pre-rifled projectile (right)

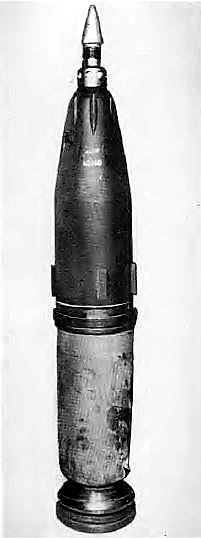
A complete 28 cm rocket-assisted projectile

== Surviving guns ==
The guns were discovered on a railroad siding in the town of Civitavecchia, on 7 June 1944, shortly after the allies had liberated Rome. Robert had been partially destroyed by the gun crew before they surrendered and Leopold was also damaged, but not as badly.

Today, K5(E) is preserved at the United States Army Ordnance Museum in Fort Lee (Petersburg, Virginia). Leopold was shipped to the United States Aberdeen Proving Ground, (Aberdeen, Maryland) where it underwent tests and evaluations. In early 2011 it was moved to Fort Lee, Virginia as a result of the 2005 Base Relocation and Closure (BRAC) Act.

A second surviving gun can be seen at the Batterie Todt museum, near Audinghen in northern France.

== See also ==
- Big Bertha (howitzer)
- M65 Atomic Annie gun
- Paris Gun
- Schwerer Gustav
- List of the largest cannons by caliber

== Notes and references ==
Notes

References

- Wildenboer, Louis (June 2005). "Anzio Annie the story of a gun". Military History Journal. 13 (3). South African Military History Society.
- Engelmann, Joachim (1976). Armor in Action - German Railroad Guns. Squadron/Signal Publications. ISBN 0-89747-048-6.
- Ulrich Ziervogel: Der Schießplatz in Rügenwalde-Bad, in: Der Kreis Schlawe - Ein pommersches Heimatbuch (M. Vollack, ed.), Vol. I: Der Kreis als Ganzes, Husum 1986, ISBN 3-88042-239-7, pp. 284–296.
- O'Rourke, R.J. (1995). Anzio Annie : she was no lady (1st ed.). Fort Washington, Md. ISBN 978-0-9645084-0-8.
