= Cap Gris-Nez =

Cape in Northern France

Coordinates: 50°52′15″N 1°35′01″E

Aerial view of Cap Gris-Nez

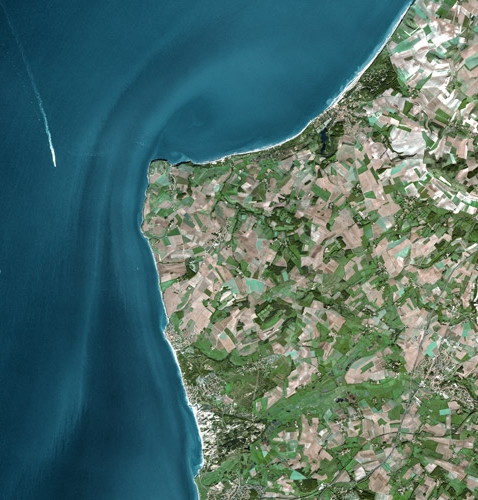
Cap Gris-Nez seen from Spot Satellite

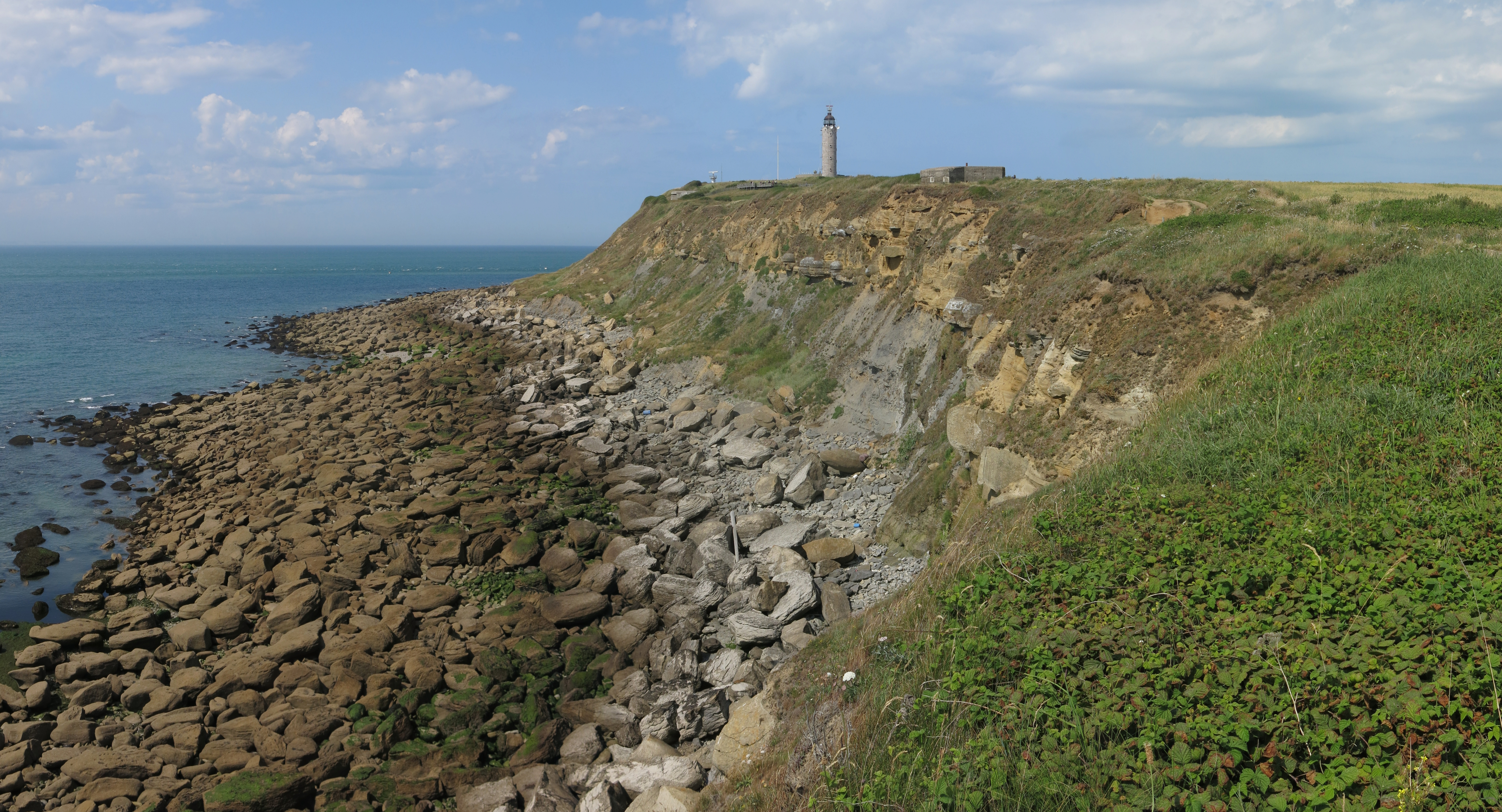
Cap Gris-Nez

Cap Gris-Nez is a cape located in Audinghen, a commune in the Pas-de-Calais département of northern France. Part of the Côte d'Opale, it is classified as a protected natural area. Its cliffs mark the closest point of France to Great Britain, separated by just 34 km (21 mi).

== Etymology ==
The name "Gris-Nez" translates to "grey nose" in French referencing the grey-coloured cliffs of the cape. The Dutch name, "Swartenesse" ("black cape"), distinguished it from "Blankenesse" ("white cape"), now known as Cap Blanc-Nez to the northeast. The suffix "-nesse" or "-nez" is cognate with the English "-ness," signifying a headland, as seen in Dungeness and Sheerness.

== Geology ==
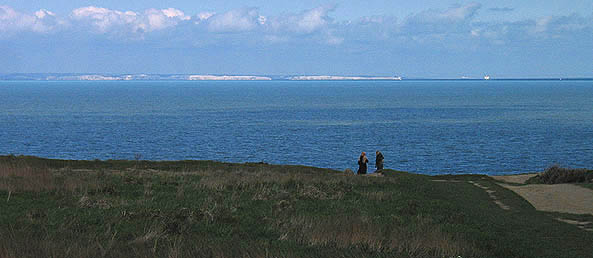
View of the English coast from Cap Gris-Nez

The cliffs of Cap Gris-Nez are composed of sandstone, clay, and chalk, primarily grey in colour. The area is a site for fossil hunting, with most fossils originating from the Jurassic period. These include bivalves, gastropods, and fossilised wood. Rare finds, such as large ammonites, as well as fish and reptile teeth, are occasionally uncovered in the sandstone layers containing small pebbles.

The cape is a migration bottleneck, providing a vantage point for observing birds migrating across the English Channel or along the coastline.

== History ==
The proximity of the cape to England resulted in the frequent destruction of the nearby village of Audinghen in wars between England and France. On the top of the cliff are the ruins of an English fortress, built by Henry VIII at the beginning of the 16th century. The English called the fort 'Blackness', a translation of the Dutch name Swartenisse.

=== Napoleonic Wars ===
On July 1, 1803, Napoleon stopped at Cape Gris-Nez whilst inspecting the coast around Boulogne-sur-Mer with his invasion troops. He envisioned establishing a cross-channel optical telegraph system, with a semaphore positioned on the cape. The first semaphore of this line was installed in 1805, even before the planned French invasion of England took place.

On July 18, 1805, the Battle of Blanc-Nez and Gris-Nez occurred, in which a numerically superior British flotilla pursued Dutch ships that were attempting to reach the harbour at Ambleteuse by following the coast. Anticipating an attack of this nature, Napoleon had stationed a battery of 300 guns on the cape. The barrage from this force forced the British vessels to withdraw.

=== World War II ===
Gabriel Auguste Ferdinand Ducuing and his men died on May 25, 1940, whilst defending the semaphore. A commemorative stele was later placed on the cape to honour their sacrifice. Later, the Germans built a blockhouse inside the Tudor ruins. The locality has a cluster of World War II bunkers, part of the Atlantic Wall intended to rebuff the anticipated Allied invasion. There are two heavy artillery sites: Grosser Kurfürst Battery, formerly with three 170 mm guns, and Todt Battery, with four 380 mm guns. These batteries covered the approaches to both Calais and Boulogne, and they were protected by large concrete blockhouses as well as other lesser defensive sites. One of the Todt Battery blockhouses now houses the Atlantic Wall Museum.

Units of the 3rd Canadian Infantry Division liberated the area in September 1944.

=== Recent History ===
The current cylindrical concrete lighthouse at Cap Gris-Nez, built in 1958, replaced a previous structure that was destroyed during the war. Standing 31 meters (102 feet) in height, the lighthouse and its accompanying radar station provide guidance to over 500 ships passing the cape every day.

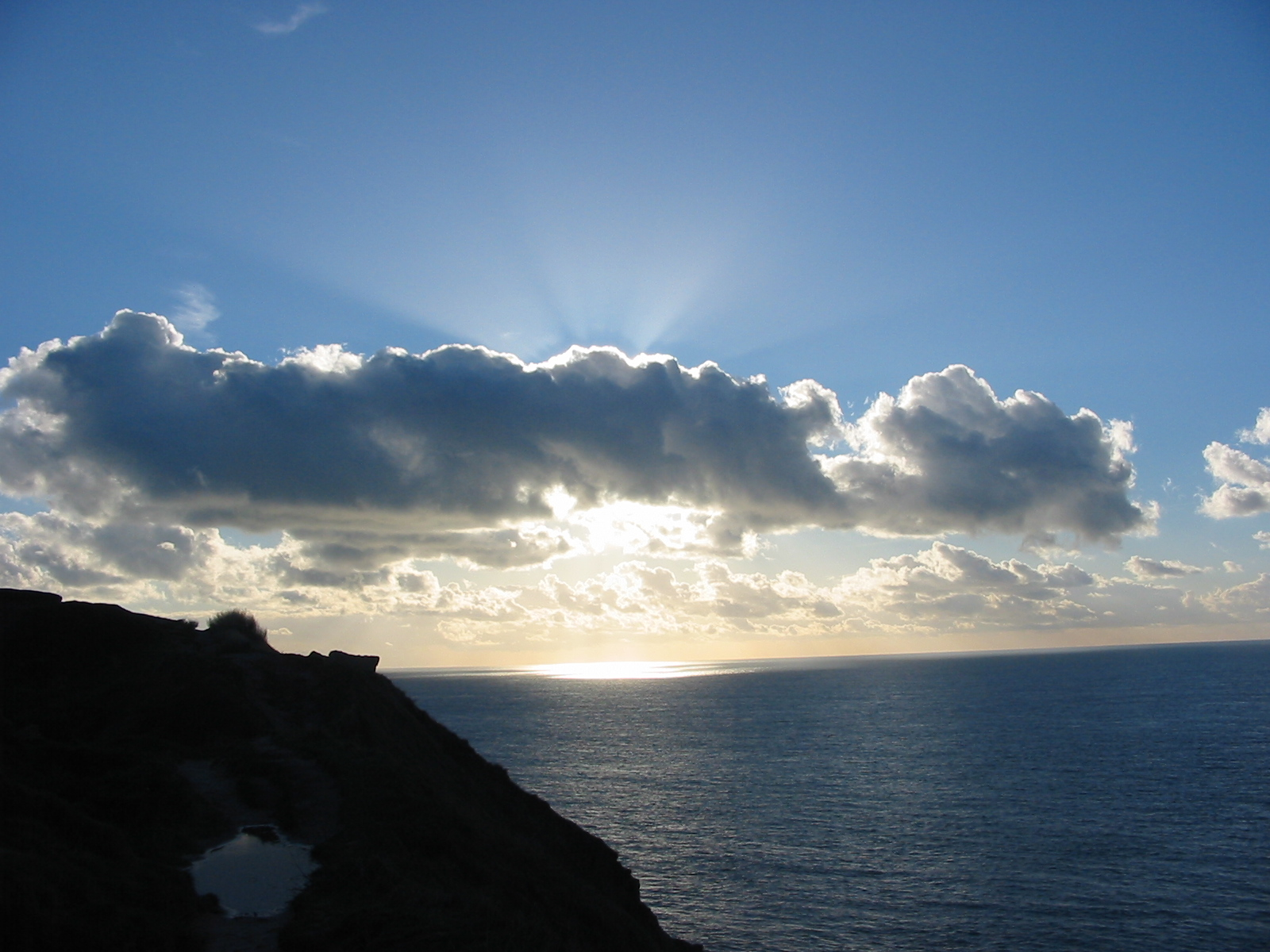
Sunset at Cape Gris-Nez

== See also ==
- Itius Portus
- Dover Strait coastal guns
