= Battery Oldenburg =

- Part of Atlantic Wall
- Calais, Pas de Calais, France
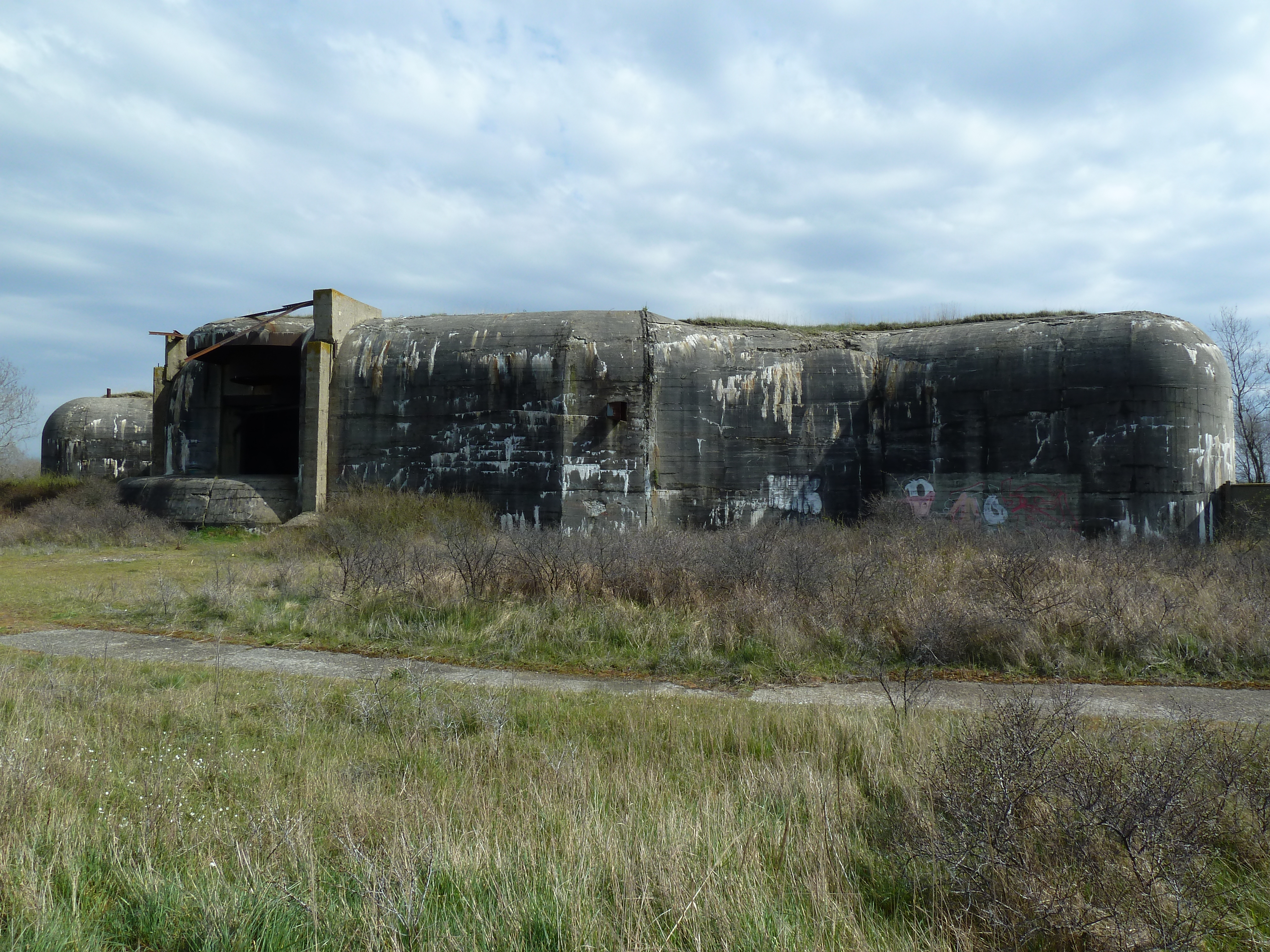
- Battery Oldenburg 2013, Calais France

- Kriegsmarine Ensign

Site information
- Open to the public: Both casemates are open to public
- Condition: Two casemates, in varied conditions with supporting bunkers

Location
- Coordinates: 50°58′33.47″N 1°54′17.38″E

Site history
- Built: 1941-1942
- Built by: Organisation Todt
- In use: 1940-44
- Materials: Concrete and steel

Garrison information
- Garrison: Kriegsmarine

Battery Oldenburg is a German artillery battery, built during World War II as part of the Atlantic Wall, and situated east of Calais. The battery began in 1940 with artillery guns in an open emplacement. The Organisation Todt built casemates around two 240mm guns during the war.

Both casemates or Turms (towers) are 35 meters long and 15 meters high, positioned in a slight offset from each other to gain a broader range with both guns. Turm East and Turm West housed guns of Russian origin that were captured by the German army during World War I and re-chambered by Krupp from 255mm to 240mm.

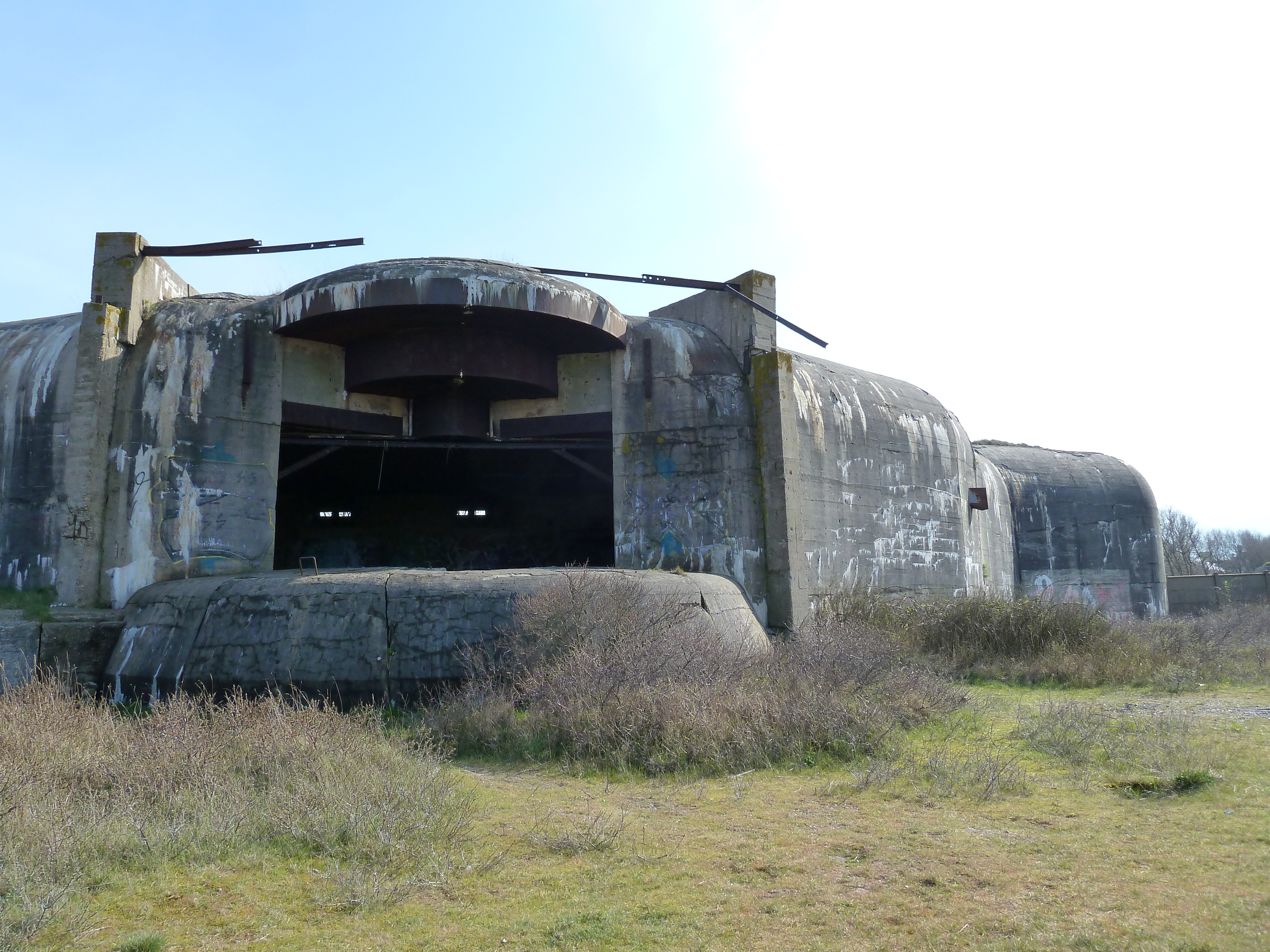
Battery Oldenburg Front

Both casemates are 35 meters long and 15 meters high above ground level. The western of the two casemates, Turm West is two storeys deep, while the eastern casemate, Turm East, is three storeys deep.

Besides the two casemates, battery Oldenburg has a combined fire control and hospital bunker, which still has a beautiful fresco and other paintings, ammunition bunkers and personnel bunkers. Behind the two casemates and fire control bunker is the barrack site used by Organisation Todt.

The battery was under the command of the Kriegsmarine section 2./MAA 244 from 1941 onwards. Battery Oldenburg was part of the coastal defence of the Strait of Dover and situated in the Hellfire Corner. Battery Oldenburg is also known as "le Moulin Rouge".

Battery Oldenburg surrendered to Canadian forces in 1944.

== See also ==
- Todt Battery
