= Audinghen =

Audinghen Oudinghen
- Commune
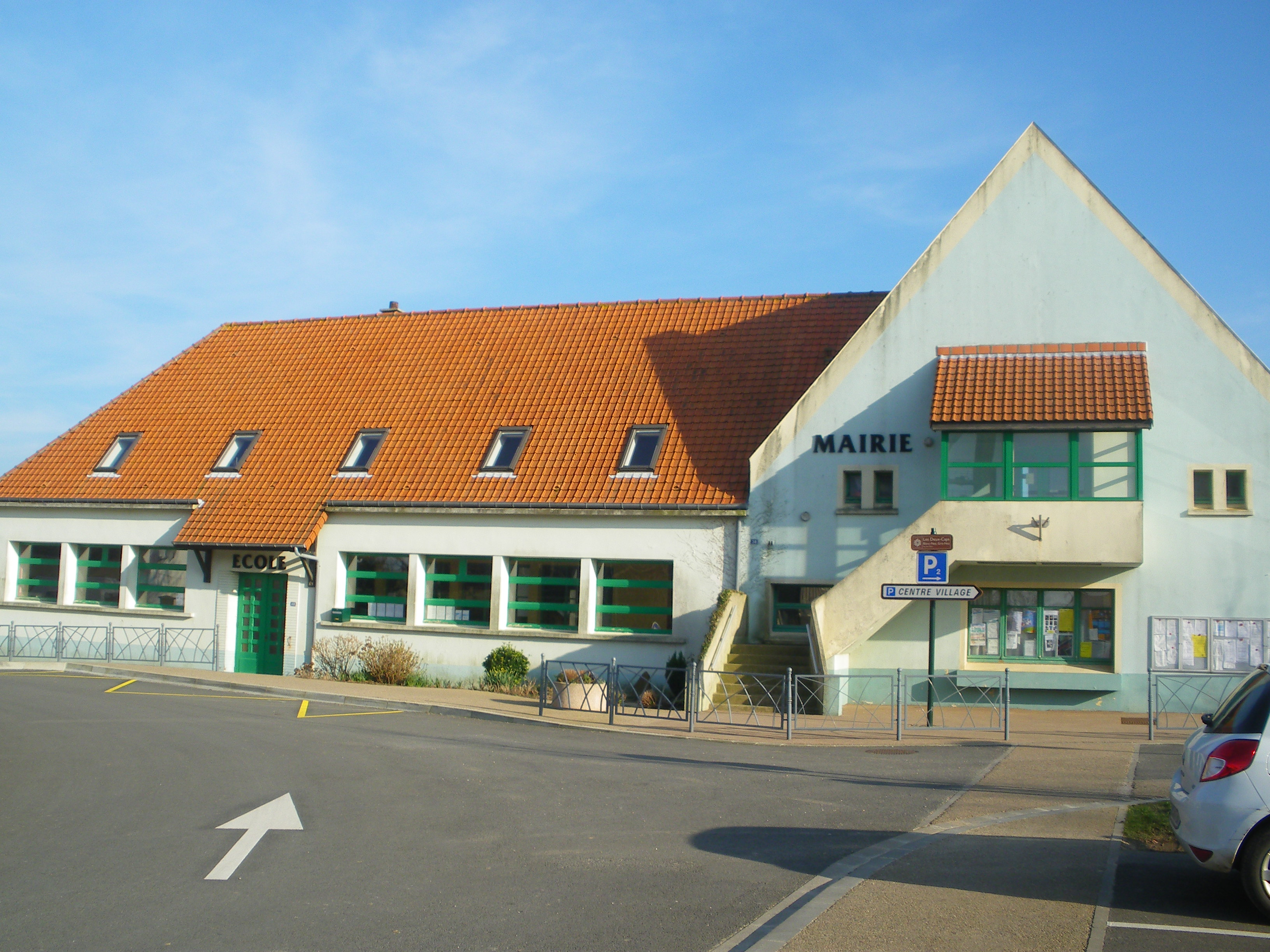
- The town hall and school of Audinghen

- Coat of arms
- Location of Audinghen
- Location within France Location within Hauts-de-France
- Coordinates: 50°51′09″N 1°36′50″E
- Country: France
- Region: Hauts-de-France
- Department: Pas-de-Calais
- Arrondissement: Boulogne-sur-Mer
- Canton: Desvres
- Intercommunality: CC Terre des Deux Caps

Government
  - Mayor (2020–2026): Marc Sarpaux
- Area^{1}: 13.09 km^{2} (5.05 sq mi)
- Elevation: 68 m (223 ft)
- Highest elevation: 123 m (404 ft)
- Lowest elevation: 0 m (0 ft)
- Population (2023): 617
  - Density: 47.1/km^{2} (122/sq mi)
- Time zone: UTC+01:00 (CET)
  - Summer (DST): UTC+02:00 (CEST)
- INSEE/Postal code: 62054 /62179
- ^{1} French Land Register data, which excludes lakes, ponds, glaciers > 1 km^{2} (0.386 sq mi or 247 acres) and river estuaries.

Audinghen (French pronunciation: [odɛ̃ɡɑ̃]; Dutch: Oudinghen) is a commune in the Pas-de-Calais department in the Hauts-de-France region of France.

== Geography ==
A farming commune, comprising several hamlets, some 14 miles (23 km) north of Boulogne-sur-Mer, at the junction of the D940 and the D191 roads. Cap Gris-Nez, the nearest part of France to the English coast, forms the western boundary of the commune.

== History ==
The town was originally named Odingehem, 'home of Odin', by the Vikings who built a temple here dedicated to the Germanic god Odin. Audinghen has been rebuilt several times after being completely destroyed, including:

- In 1643 or 1644, according to the interpretations, by a party of soldiers of the King of England, who burned the village population inside the church;
- Three centuries later, in November 1943, by the British, who bombed and totally destroyed the village (then occupied by the German army) and a centre for Organisation Todt.

== Population ==
Historical population
Year	Pop.	±% p.a.
1968	457	—
1975	461	+0.12%
1982	468	+0.22%
1990	503	+0.91%
1999	548	+0.96%
2007	580	+0.71%
2012	585	+0.17%
2017	582	−0.10%
2023	617	+0.98%
Source: INSEE

== Sights ==
- The church of St. Pierre, dating from the twentieth century.
- The ruins of the lighthouse at Cap Gris Nez.
- World War II German defences, part of the Atlantic wall.

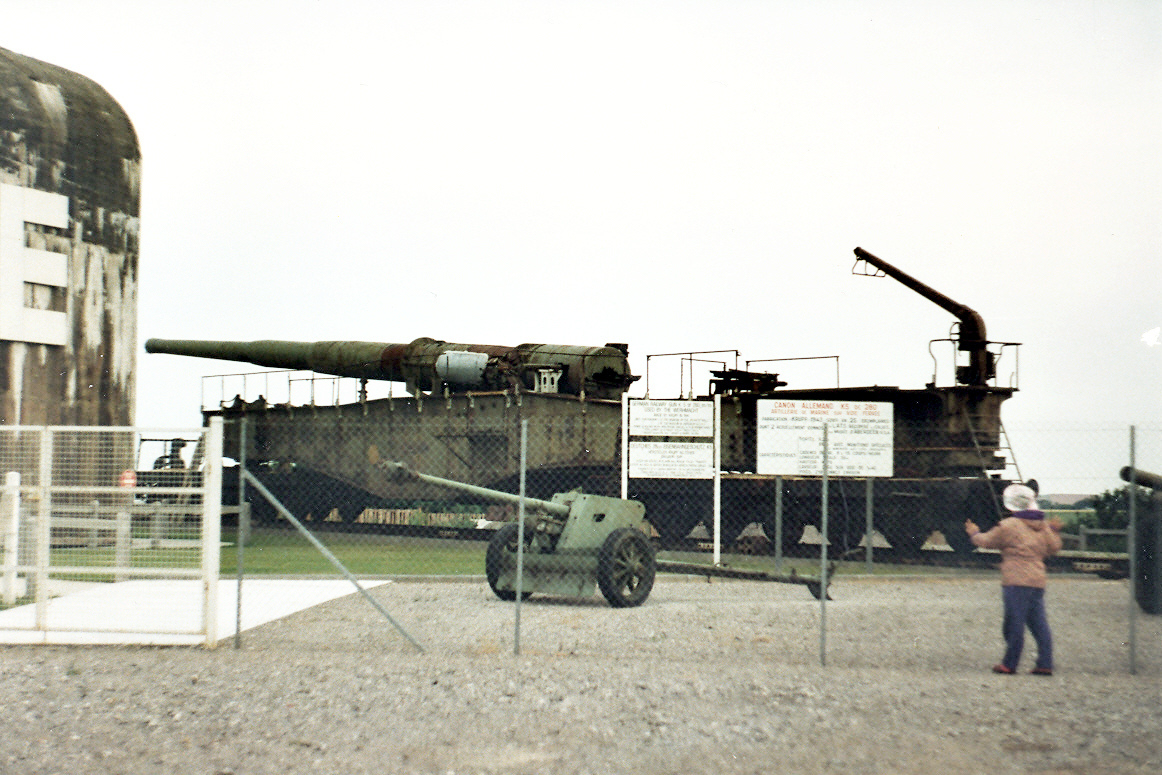
Part of the German defences, at the Todt Battery

== Personalities ==
- Gabriel Auguste Ferdinand Ducuing, soldier who died here in 1940.
- Raoul de Godewaersvelde, composer, died here in 1977.

== See also ==
- Communes of the Pas-de-Calais department
