= Hanstholm Fortress =

WWII Nazi German coastal fort in Denmark

Coordinates: 57°7′15″N 8°36′59″E

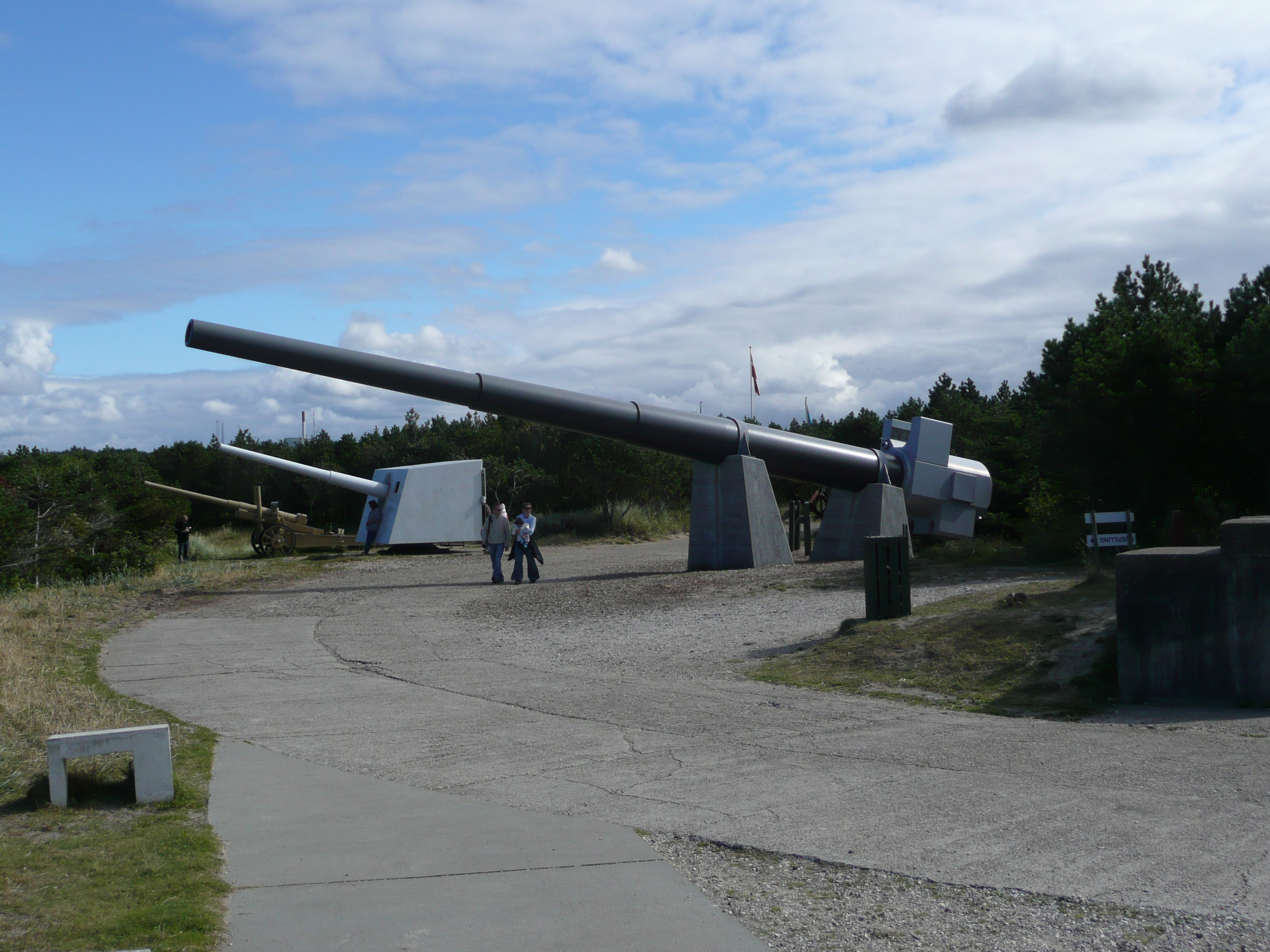
Hanstholm Fortress

Hanstholm fortress (German: Festung Hanstholm; Danish: Hanstholm batteri) was a large coastal fortification, built by Nazi Germany at Hanstholm in north-western Denmark during World War II. The remains of the fortress is now a World War II museum situated in Thy National Park.

== History ==
Hanstholm Fortress was part of the "Atlantic Wall" and its main purpose was to seal off the entrance to Skagerrak together with the Vara fortress in Kristiansand, southern Norway, and extensive minefields in Skagerrak. The fortress had a wide range of artillery, from medium-sized 17 cm SK L/40 guns up to four 38 cm S.K.C/34 guns, weighing 110 tons each (the whole gun position weighing 650 tonnes). The guns were protected by 3.5 metres (11 ft) of reinforced concrete and many anti-aircraft guns. The 38 cm guns were similar to the ones fitted to the Bismarck-class battleships and had been intended for the battleships Scharnhorst and Gneisenau. However, after Gneisenau was damaged in a bomb raid, a decision was made not to fit the guns to the ship, but to use them instead in fortresses. The guns could fire a 495-kilogram (1,091 lb) projectile 55 kilometres (34 mi), or an 800 kg (1,800 lb) shell 42 km (26 mi). The rate of fire was 1 shot per 1.5 minutes. The fortress was defended by German Naval Artillery Battalion 118.

== Post war ==
The 38 cm guns were scrapped in 1951–52. Today, the remains of the fortress is a museum.

== German units at Hanstholm fortress ==
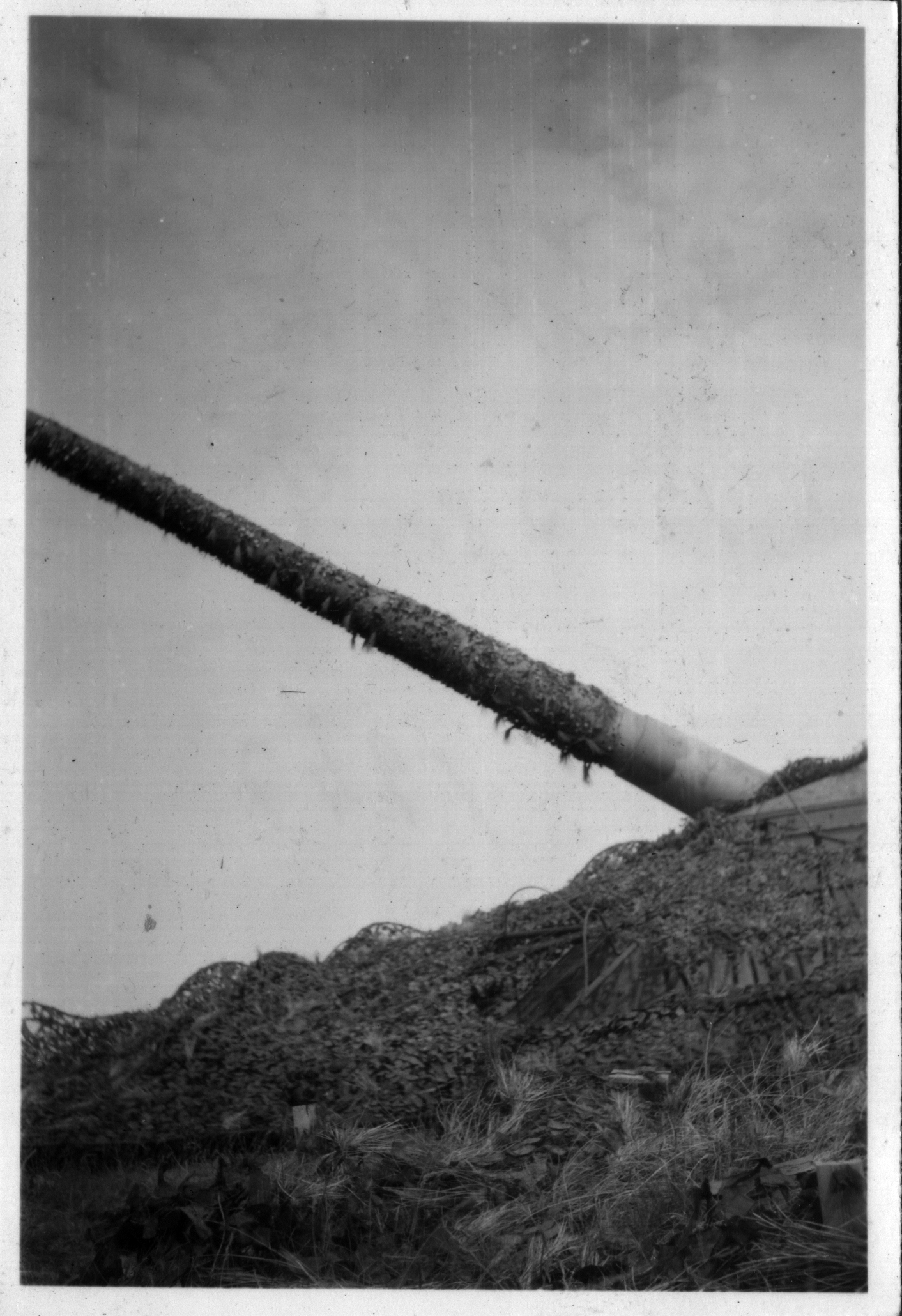
Gun with camouflage netting in 1947

Unit	Equipment
1./M.A.A. 118	4x 17 cm 2x 2 cm FlaK; 2x 110 cm searchlights 2x 90 cm searchlights (Danish); 2x 7.5 cm field guns (Polish); 6x 2.5 cm FlaK Hotchkiss
2./M.A.A. 118	4x 38 cm 6x 7.5 cm field guns 2x 4.7 cm fortress anti-tank guns 5x medium flamethrowers 6x light flamethrowers 3x heavy mortars
1. M.Fl.A. 814	4x 10.5 cm FlaK; 4x 3.7 cm FlaK; 7x 2 cm FlaK
2. M.Fl.A. 814	4x 7.5 cm FlaK Vickers
3. M.Fl.A. 814	4x 7.5 cm FlaK Vickers
4. M.Fl.A. 814	4x 7.5 cm FlaK Vickers
7. M.Fl.A. 814	11x 150 cm searchlights 4x 60 cm searchlights

== Gallery ==
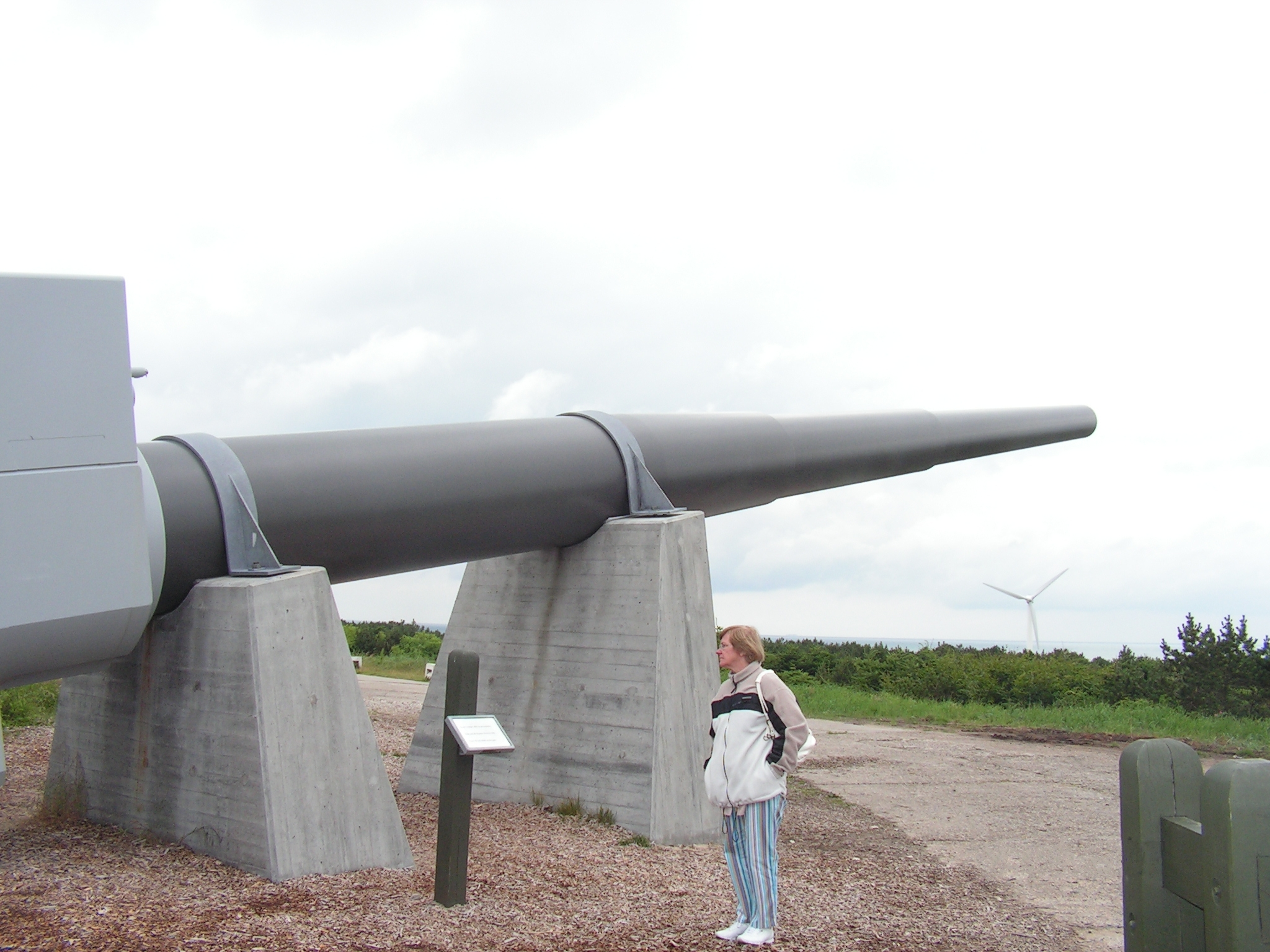
38 cm S.K.C/34 gun barrel. This particular gun barrel was never actually mounted.

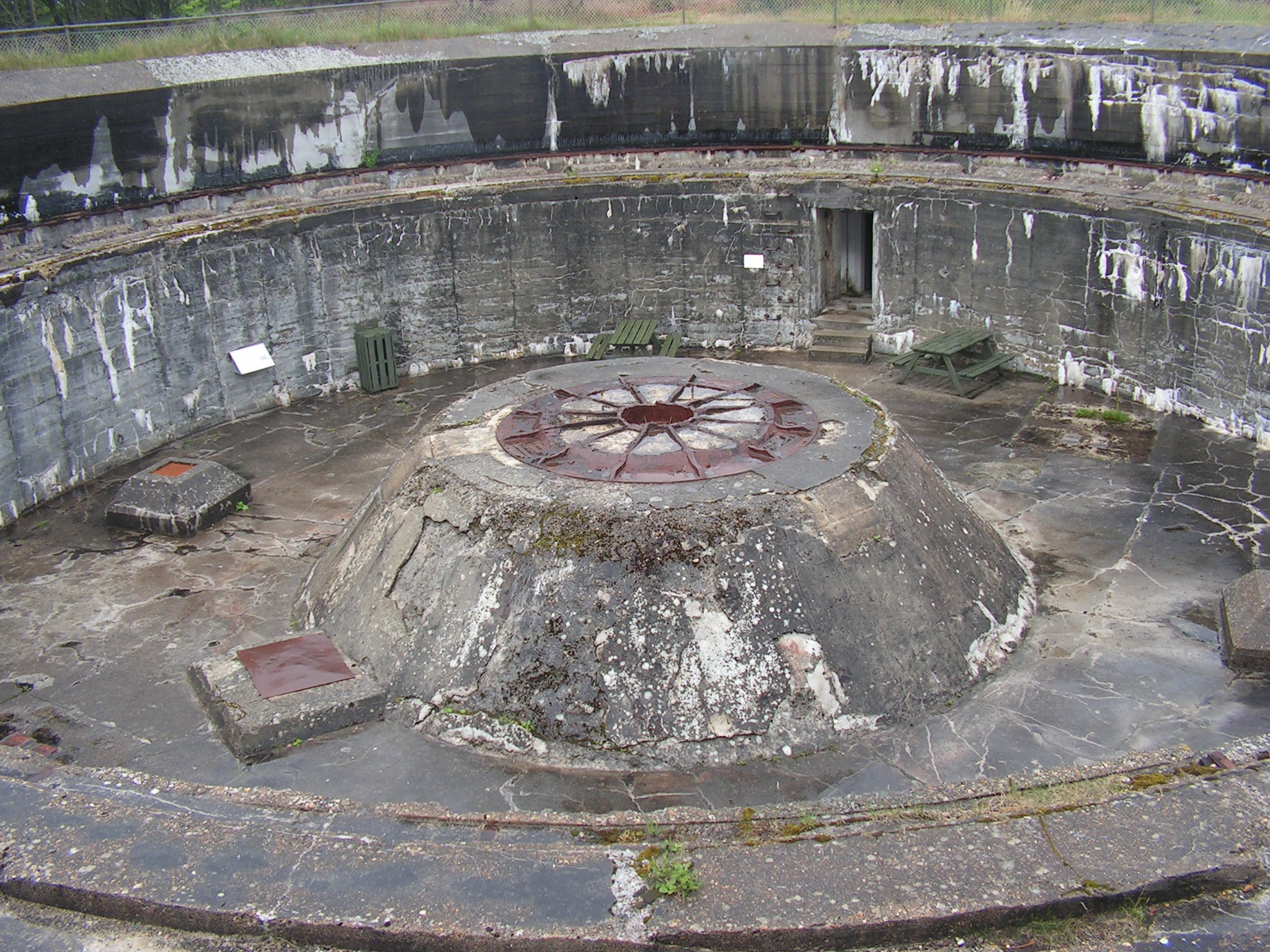
Remains of a gun pit.

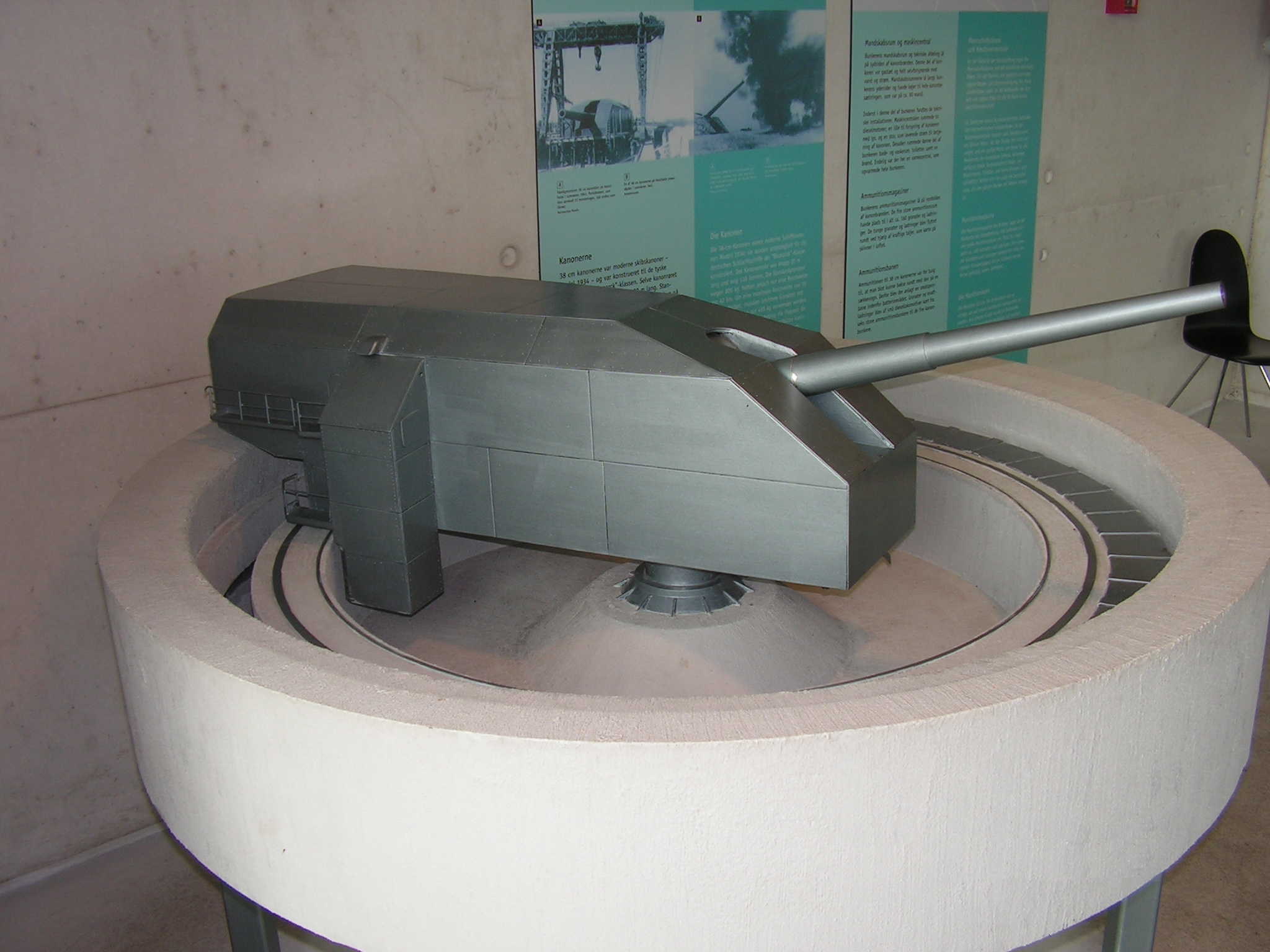
Model of the original 38 cm guns.

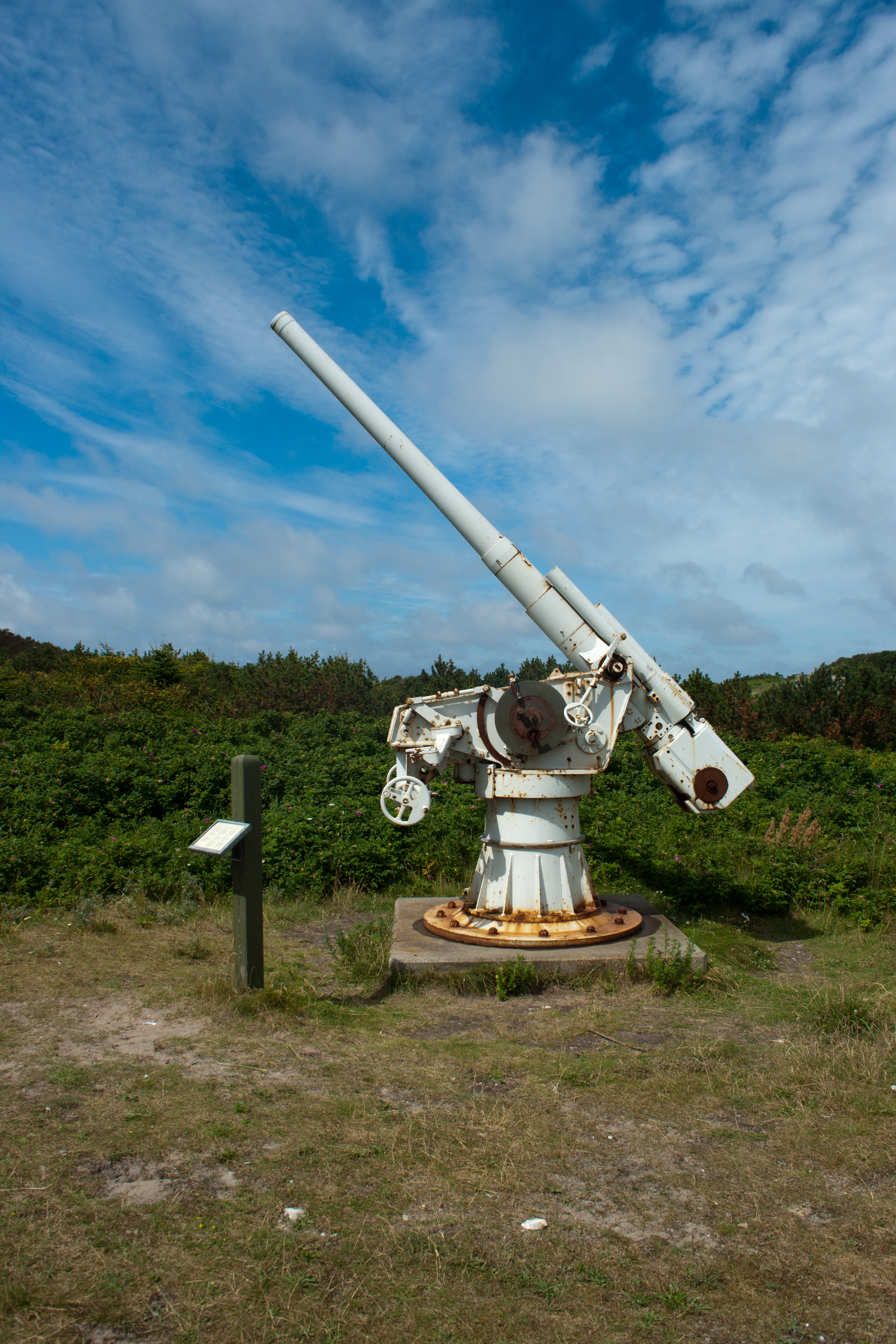
Anti aircraft gun.

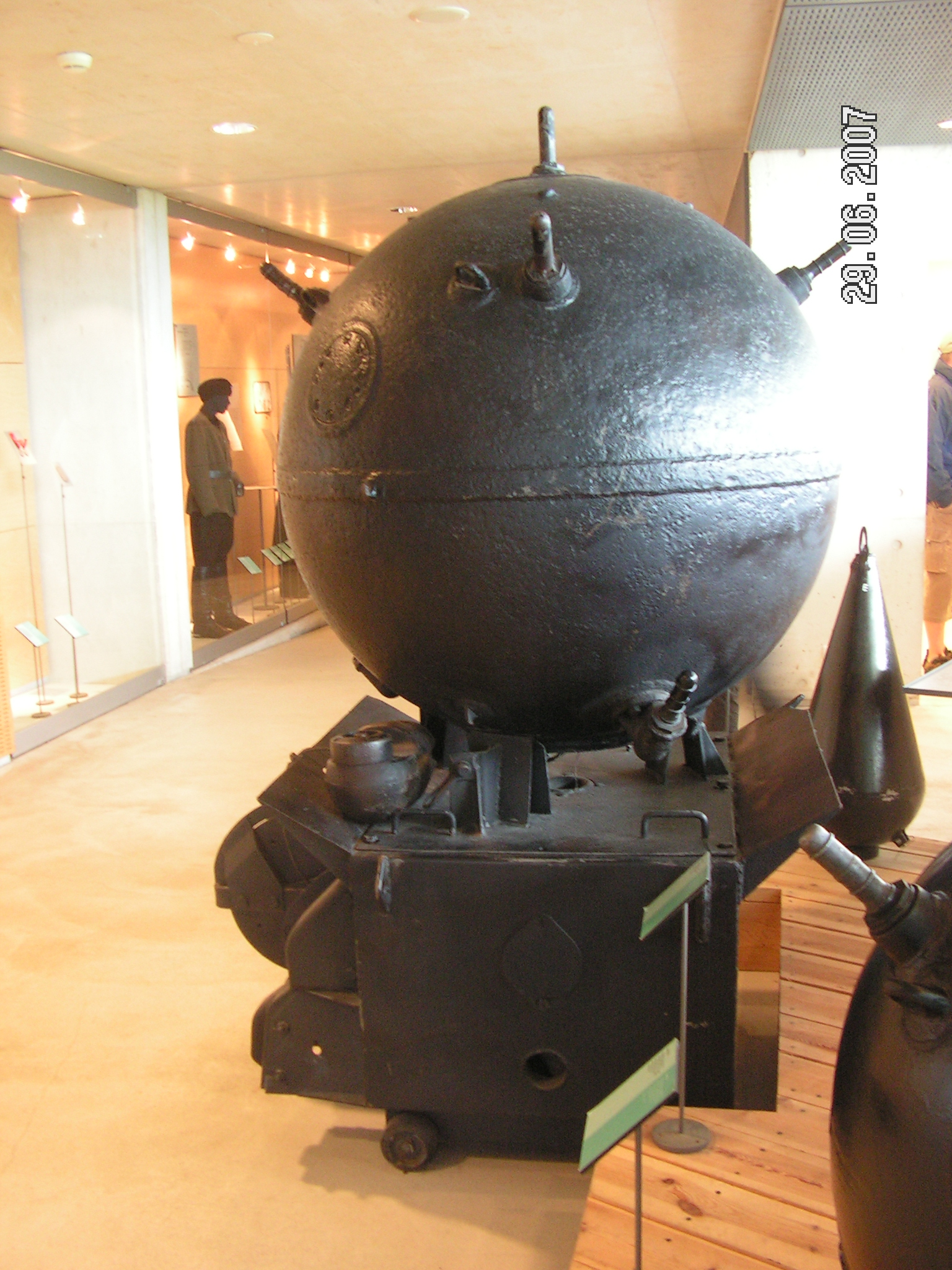
German anchor-mine.

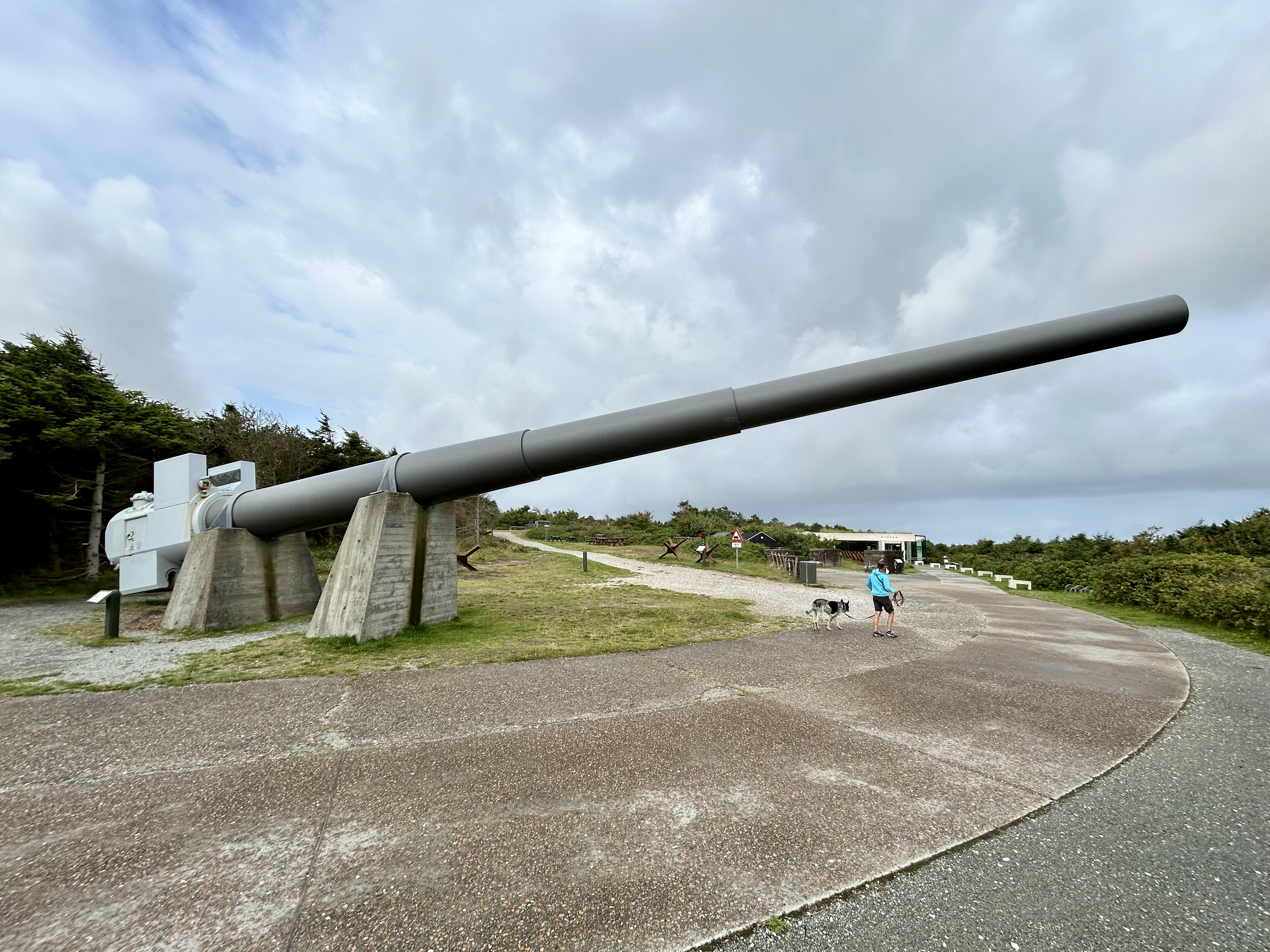

Geschutz 3 (G3) gun emplacement

Bunker

Inner railway tracks

Inner railway tunnel

Bunker

== See also ==
- Battery Todt
- Kristiansand Cannon Museum
