= Tirpitz Museum (Denmark) =

Museum in Blåvand, Denmark

- Tirpitz Museet

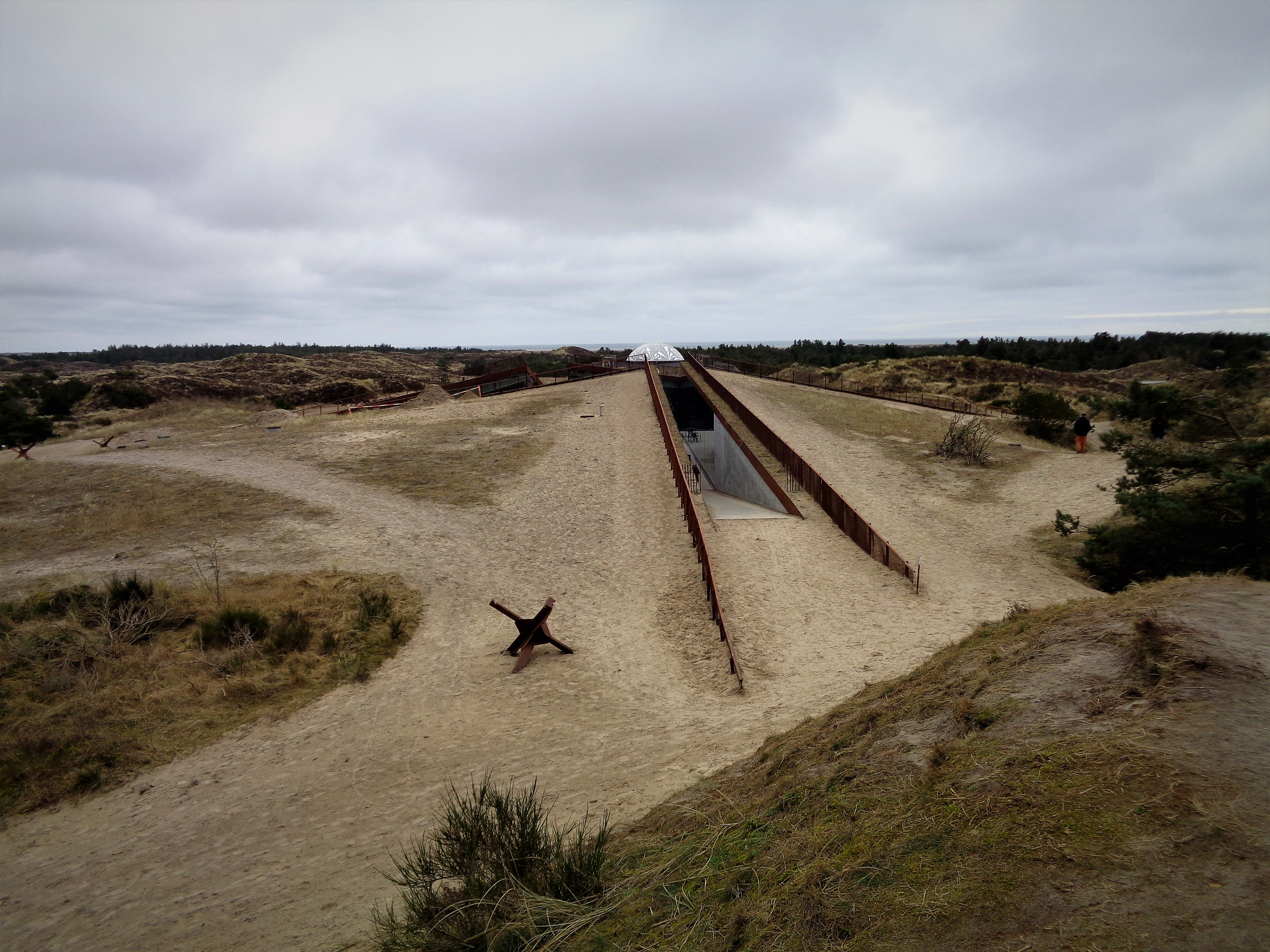
- Entrance
- Location: Tirpitzvej 1; 6857 Blåvand, Denmark
- Coordinates: 55.5504°N 8.1722°E
- Visitors: 100,000 exp.
- Director: Claus Kjeld Jensen
- Website: Official Website

Tirpitz Museum (Danish: Tirpitz Museet), also called Blåvand Bunker Museum, is a museum in Blåvand, on the coast of Jutland. It is built in an old bunker from which it got its name, and features exhibitions on the Atlantic Wall, the west coast of Denmark, and an amber collection.

== History ==
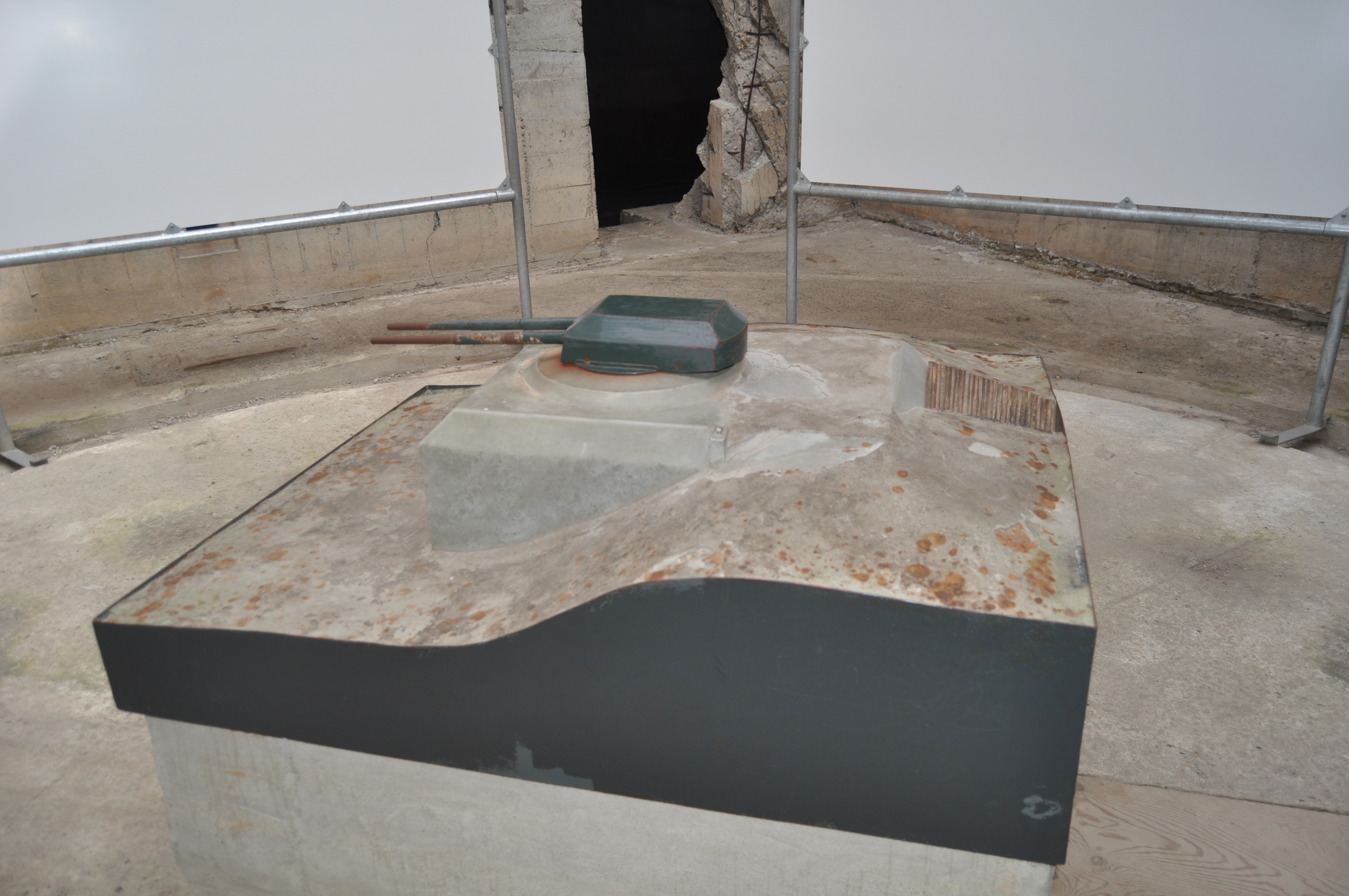
Model of one of turrets.

The Tirpitz Bunker started construction in 1944, and was built as part of the defense around the city of Esbjerg. Following the surrender of the German forces, construction was halted, and the bunker was therefore never completed. The bunker was designed to house 2 turrets with 2 38 cm SK C/34 naval guns each. After the war, the bunker was abandoned and later turned into a small museum.

In 2012, it was decided to expand and completely redesign the museum, with Bjarke Ingels Group being chosen as architect of the new museum. The new museum features open spaces and is built into the dunes. The permanent exhibitions were designed by Dutch experience design agency Tinker Imagineers.

On 29 June 2017, an opening ceremony was held, with the Crown Prince and Minister of Culture attending.

== Exhibitions ==
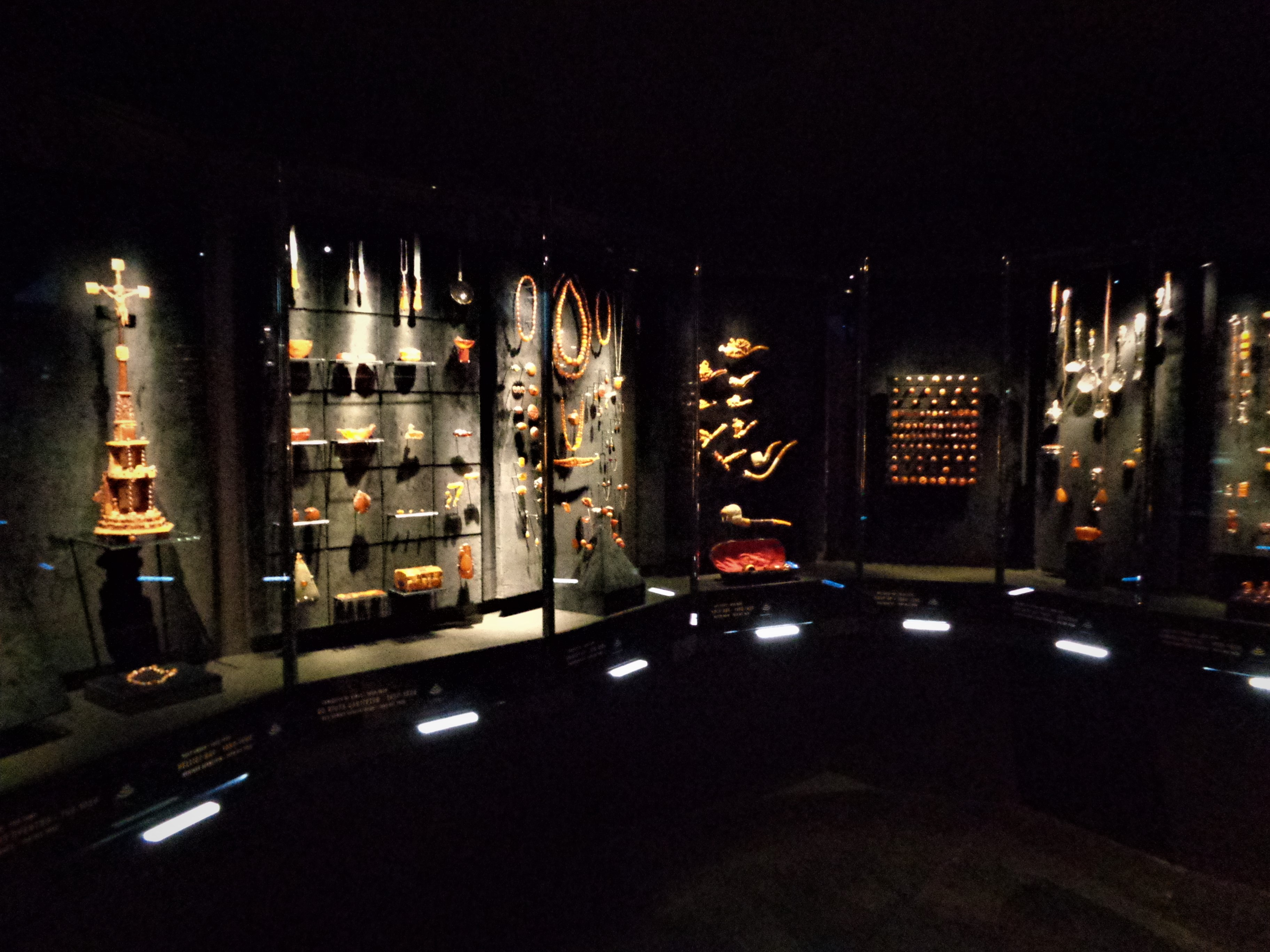
Gold of the Sea exhibition

The Museum features 4 exhibition areas, 3 of which are permanent exhibitions. Furthermore, it is possible to enter the old bunker and gun turret with a glass reconstruction of the artillery guns.

An Army of Concrete

Tells about Atlantic Wall and personal stories from the surrounding areas.

West Coast Stories

Tells the story of the 20,000 year old history of the Danish West Coast.

Gold of the Sea

Features the largest collection of amber in Denmark.

Temporary exhibition

"After the War" is a temporary exhibition held during 2025 and 2026. The exhibition focuses on everyday life in Denmark during the war, as well as the early post-war years, when society slowly had to be rebuilt.

Temporary exhibitions of earlier years include mine clearance, which features props and sets from the movie Land of Mine.

== See also ==
- Atlantic Wall
