= 38 cm Siegfried K (E) =

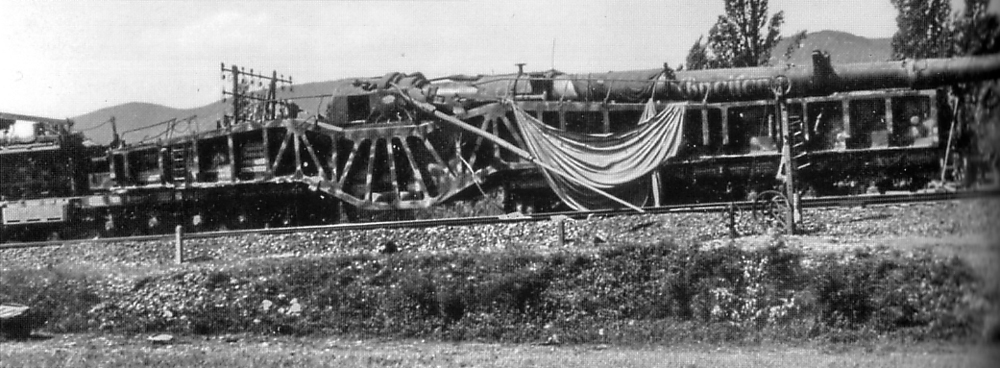
- A Siegfried K (E) destroyed by American aircraft in the Rhône Valley, 1944
- Type: Railway gun
- Place of origin: Nazi Germany

Service history
- In service: 1941–1945
- Used by: Nazi Germany
- Wars: World War II

Production history
- Designer: Krupp
- Designed: 1939 - 1941
- Manufacturer: Krupp
- No. built: 4

Specifications
- Mass: 286 tonnes (281 long tons; 315 short tons)
- Length: 31.32 metres (102 ft 9 in)
- Barrel length: 18.405 metres (60 ft 5 in) L/48.4
- Shell: separate-loading, cased charge
- Calibre: 381 millimetres (15 in)
- Breech: horizontal sliding-block
- Recoil: hydro-pneumatic
- Carriage: 2 x 8-axle bogies
- Elevation: 0° to 52.3°
- Traverse: none (on mount); 360° (on turntable)
- Muzzle velocity: 820–1,050 m/s (2,700–3,400 ft/s)
- Maximum firing range: 55,700 metres (60,900 yd)

The 38 cm Siegfried K (E) was a German World War II railway gun based on the 38 cm SK C/34 naval gun that served as the main armament of the Bismarck-class battleships. Only four were produced. K stands for Kanone (cannon), E for Eisenbahnlafette (on railroad mounting).

== Design ==
Like the 38 cm SK C/34 naval guns deployed as coastal defense, the 38 cm Siegfried K guns were modified with a larger chamber to handle the increased amount of propellant used for the special long-range Siegfried shells.

The gun had no ability to traverse on its mount, relying instead on moving along a curving section of track or on a Vögele turntable to aim. The turntable (Drehscheibe) consisted of a circular track with a pivot mount in the center for a platform on which the railroad gun itself was secured. A ramp was used to raise the railway gun to the level of the platform. The platform had rollers at each end which rested on the circular rail for 360° traverse. It had a capacity of 300 tonnes (300 long tons; 330 short tons), enough for most of the railroad guns in the German inventory. The gun could only be loaded at 0° elevation and so had to be re-aimed for each shot.

== Ammunition ==
The gun used the standard German naval system of ammunition where the base charge was held in a metallic cartridge case and supplemented by another charge in a silk bag which was rammed first.

Four types of shells were used by the 38 cm Siegfried K (E), including the special long-range Siegfried shell (Siegfried—Granate) developed by the army. Almost 40 per-cent lighter, it could be fired with a reduced charge at 920 metres per second (3,000 ft/s) to 40,000 metres (44,000 yd). With a full charge it reached 1,050 metres per second (3,400 ft/s) and could travel 55,700 metres (60,900 yd)–equivalent to over 34.5 miles.

Shell name	Weight	Filling Weight	Muzzle velocity	Range
nose-fused HE shell with ballistic cap (Sprenggranate L/4.6 m KZ m Hb)	800 kg (1,800 lb)	Unknown	820 m/s (2,700 ft/s)	42,000 m (46,000 yd)
base-fused HE shell with ballistic cap (Sprenggranate L/4.4 m BdZ m Hb))	800 kg (1,800 lb)	Unknown	820 m/s (2,700 ft/s)	42,000 m (46,000 yd)
base-fused AP shell with ballistic cap (Panzer- Sprenggranate L/4.4 m BdZ m Hb))	800 kg (1,800 lb)	Unknown	820 m/s (2,700 ft/s)	42,000 m (46,000 yd)
nose- and base-fused HE shell with ballistic cap (Si-Gr L/4.5 Bdz u. Kz (m.Hb)) (light load)	495 kg (1,091 lb)	69 kg (152 lb) TNT	920 m/s (3,000 ft/s)	40,000 m (44,000 yd)
nose- and base-fused HE shell with ballistic cap (Si-Gr L/4.5 Bdz u. Kz (m.Hb)) (full load)	495 kg (1,091 lb)	69 kg (152 lb) TNT	1,050 m/s (3,400 ft/s)	55,700 m (60,900 yd)
