= 38 cm SK C/34 naval gun =

1930s German naval gun

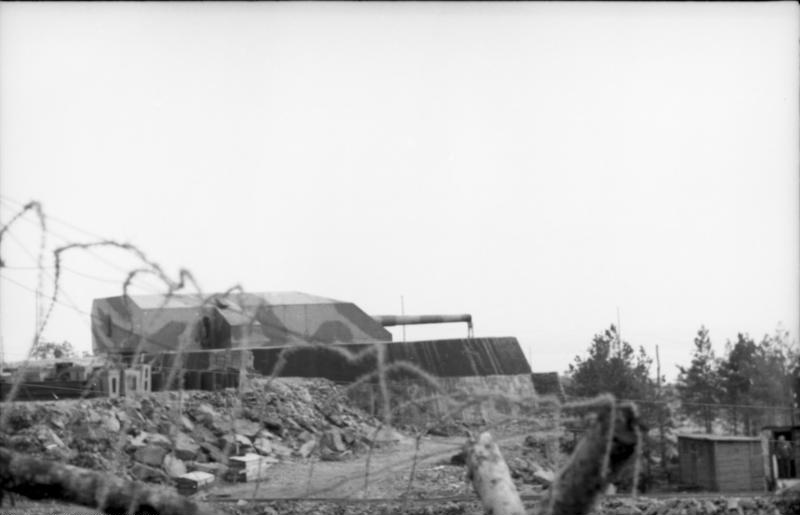
- 38 cm turret of Batterie Vara, Kristiansand, Norway
- Type: Naval gun, Railroad gun and Coastal defense
- Place of origin: Germany

Service history
- In service: 1940–45
- Used by: Nazi Germany
- Wars: World War II

Production history
- Designer: Krupp
- Designed: 1936–39
- Manufacturer: Krupp

Specifications
- Mass: 111 tonnes (109 long tons; 122 short tons)
- Length: 19.63 m (64 ft 5 in)
- Barrel length: 18.405 m (60 ft 4.6 in) L/52 (51.66 calibers)
- Shell: separate-loading, cased charge AP 800 kg
- Caliber: 380 millimetres (15 in)
- Breech: horizontal sliding-block
- Recoil: Hydro-pneumatic
- Elevation: -5.5° to +30°
- Traverse: up to 360°
- Rate of fire: 2.5 rounds per minute
- Muzzle velocity: 820 m/s (2,700 ft/s)
- Maximum firing range: 35.5 km (22.1 mi) with 800 kg (1,800 lb) shell at 30° elev.

The 38 cm SK C/34 (Note: SK – Schiffskanone (ship's gun) - Post 1920; C – Construktionsjahr (year of design)) naval gun was developed by Germany in the late 1930s. It armed the Bismarck-class battleships and was planned as the armament of the O-class battlecruisers and the re-armed Scharnhorst-class battleships. Six twin-gun mountings were also sold to the Soviet Union and it was planned to use them on the Kronshtadt-class battlecruisers, however, they were never delivered. Spare guns were used as coastal artillery in Denmark, Norway and France. One gun and one barrel is currently on display at Møvik Fortress outside Kristiansand, Norway and Hanstholm Fortress, Denmark respectively.

== Ammunition ==
It used the standard German naval system of ammunition where the base charge was held in a metallic cartridge case and supplemented by another charge in a silk bag. Both cartridges were rammed together.

Propellant charge

Main charge: 38 cm HuelsKart34 – GefLdG – 108 kg (238 lb) RP C/38 (16/7)

Fore charge: 38 cm VorKart34 – GefLdG – 104 kg (229 lb) RP C/38 (16/7)

=== Shell ===
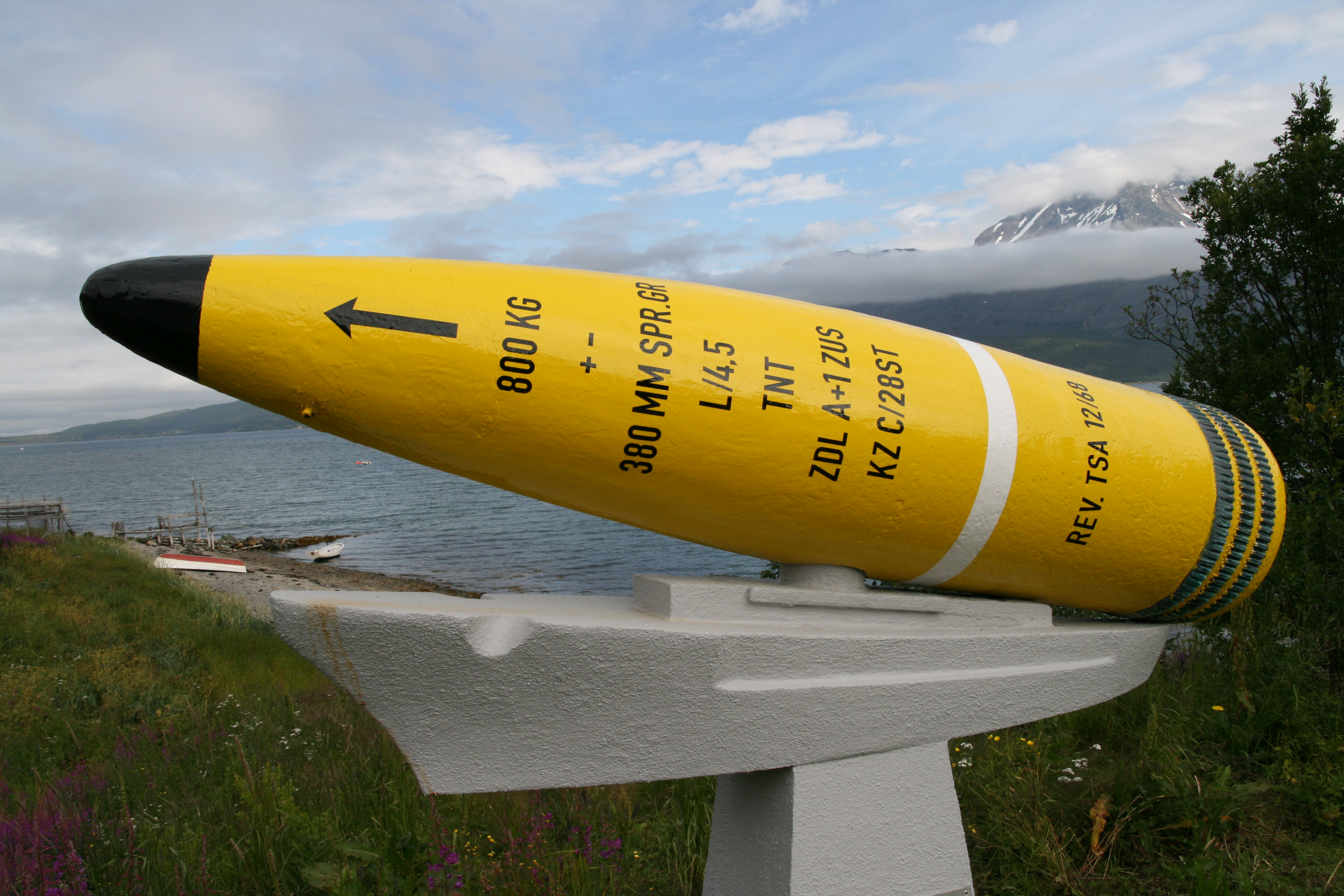
38 cm shell from Tirpitz found in the Ullsfjorden in Norway

Four types of shells were used by the 38 cm SK C/34, although the Siegfried-Granate could only be used by the coastal defense versions. Almost 40 percent lighter, this shell could be fired with a reduced charge at 920 metres per second (3,000 ft/s) out to 40 kilometres (44,000 yd). With a full charge it reached 1,050 metres per second (3,400 ft/s) and could travel 55.7 kilometres (60,900 yd) – over 34 miles.

Shell name type	Weight	Filling weight	Muzzle velocity	Range
38 cm Spreng grenate. L/4.6 m Kz (m.Hb) nose-fused HE shell with ballistic cap	800 kg (1,800 lb)	approximately 62.8kg TNT	820 m/s (2,700 ft/s)	35.6 km (22.1 mi) at 30°
38 cm Spgr L4.5 Bdz (m.Hb) base-fused HE shell with ballistic cap	800 kg (1,800 lb)	approximately 35kg TNT	820 m/s (2,700 ft/s)	35.6 km (22.1 mi) at 30°
Psgr L/4.4 Bdz (m.Hb) base-fused AP shell with a ballistic cap	800 kg (1,800 lb)	approximately 20.3kg TNT	820 m/s (2,700 ft/s)	35.6 km (22.1 mi) at 30°
nose- and base-fused HE shell with ballistic cap (Si.Gr L/4.5 Bdz u. Kz (m.Hb)) (light charge)	495 kg (1,091 lb)	69 kg (152 lb) TNT	920 m/s (3,000 ft/s)	40.0 km (24.9 mi)
nose- and base-fused HE shell with ballistic cap (Si.Gr L/4.5 Bdz u. Kz (m.Hb)) (full charge)	495 kg (1,091 lb)	69 kg (152 lb) TNT	1,050 m/s (3,400 ft/s)	55.7 km (34.6 mi)

== Naval gun ==
The data given is according to Krupp datasheet 38 cm S.K.C/34 e WA52-453(e). This gun was mounted in pairs in the C/34e turret which allowed elevation from -5° 30' to +30°. Each gun had an individual cradle, spaced 3.5 metres (11 ft) apart, but they were normally coupled together. In general the turret was hydraulically powered, but the training gear, auxiliary elevation, auxiliary hoists and some loading gear was electrically powered. The turrets weighed 1,048 tonnes (1,031 long tons; 1,155 short tons) to 1,056 tonnes (1,039 long tons; 1,164 short tons), rested on ball bearings on a 8.75 metres (28.7 ft) diameter track, could elevate 6° per second and traverse 5.4° per second. The guns were loaded at +2.5° and used a telescoping chain-operated rammer. According to German manuals the required permanent capacity for the loading equipment for ammunition was 2.5 shells per minute. During testing period at the Baltic Sea the AVKS Report states an output of the ammunition delivery system up to 3.125 shells per minute. Under battle conditions Bismarck averaged roughly one round per minute in her battle with HMS Hood and Prince of Wales.

=== Turret armor ===
location	thickness	location	thickness
face	36 cm (14.2 in)	front and rear sloping roof	18 cm (7.1 in)
sides	22 cm (8.7 in)	side sloping roof	15 cm (5.9 in)
rear	32 cm (12.6 in)	flat roof	13 cm (5.1 in)

=== Numbers ===
Sixteen guns were used for Bismarck and Tirpitz and six were ordered for Gneisenau when she was to be re-armed in 1942. Six were intended for each of the O-class battlecruisers, but it is uncertain how many of these last were actually delivered. Six mountings with twelve guns were sold to the Soviet Union who planned to use them on two Kronshtadt-class battlecruisers, but these were never delivered. Surplus guns were used as coast defense guns.

=== Anti-aircraft ===
During repairs after Operation Tungsten, the 38 cm SK C/34 naval guns of the Bismarck-class battleship Tirpitz were modified to allow their use against aircraft, being supplied with specially-fuzed 38 cm shells for barrage anti aircraft fire, in a manner similar to the Japanese San Shiki "Beehive" shells fired by the Yamato-class and other battleships. Tirpitz fired her main battery against Royal Navy Fleet Air Arm aircraft in Operations Planet, Brawn, Tiger Claw, Mascot and Goodwood. In Operations Paravane, Obviate, and Catechism, Tirpitz's 38 cm fragmentation shells proved ineffective in countering the Royal Air Force's high-level bombers.

== Coast defense gun ==
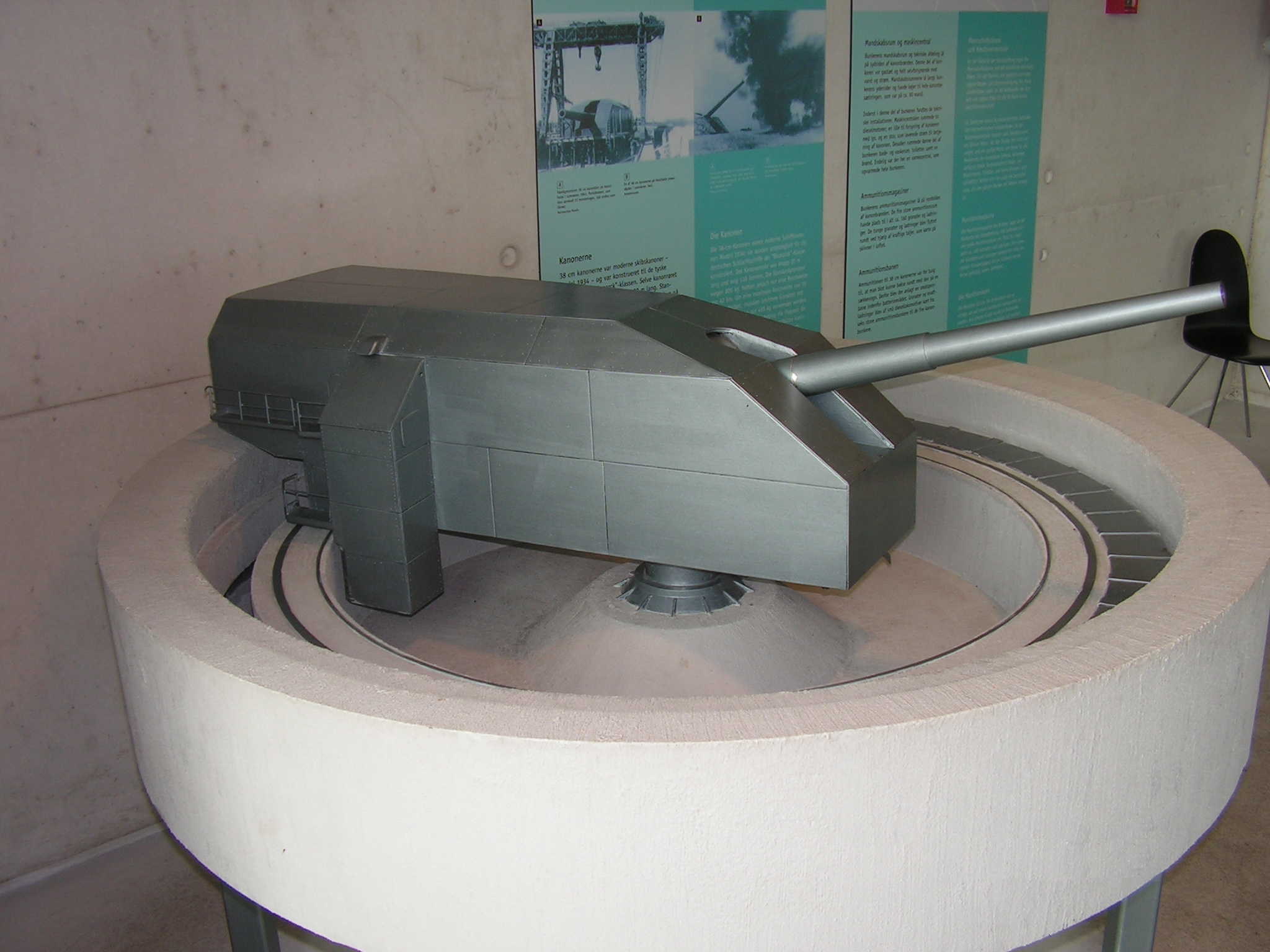
Model of the 38 cm SK C/34 emplacement at Hanstholm

These guns were modified with a larger chamber for coast defense duties to handle the increased amount of propellant used for the special long-range Siegfried shells. Gander and Chamberlain quote a weight of 105.3 tonnes (103.6 long tons; 116.1 short tons) for these guns, presumably accounting for the extra volume of the enlarged chamber. An armored single mount, the Bettungsschiessgerüst ("Firing platform") C/39 was used by these guns. It had a maximum elevation of 60° and could traverse up to 360°, depending on the emplacement. The C/39 mount had two compartments; the upper housed the guns and their loading equipment, while the lower contained the ammunition hoists, their motors, and the elevation and traverse motors. The mount was fully powered and had an underground magazine. Normally these were placed in open concrete barbettes, relying on their armor, but Hitler thought that there was not enough protection for the guns of Battery Todt emplaced on Cap-Gris-Nez in the Pas de Calais near Wimereux and ordered a concrete casemate 3.5 m (11 ft) thick built over and around the mounts. This had the effect of limiting their traverse to 120°. Other C/39 mounts were installed at the Hanstholm fortress in Denmark, and the Vara fortress in Kristiansand, Norway.

Four Drh LC/34 turrets, three of which were originally intended to re-arm the Gneisenau and one completed to the Soviet order, modified for land service, were planned to be emplaced at Paimpol, Brittany and on the Cap de la Hague on the Cotentin Peninsula, but construction never actually began. Construction for two of those turrets was well underway at Blaavand-Oksby, Denmark when the war ended.

== Railroad gun ==
Some guns also saw service as 38 cm Siegfried K (E) railroad guns, one of these being captured by American forces during the Rhône Valley campaign in 1944.

== History ==
The first time these guns were used in combat was when the German battleship Bismarck sailed out to hunt convoys alongside the heavy cruiser Prinz Eugen in May 1941. Enroute was countered by the British heavy cruisers Norfolk and Suffolk, where the 38-cm guns were fired in anger for the first time in the war, warding off the two heavy cruisers (although the blast from them disabled the ship's own radar). Soon afterwards, the British battleships HMS Hood and Prince of Wales engaged Bismarck, and her guns were fired in anger again, sinking Hood with a single hit. With Hood sunk, Bismarck turned her attention to Prince of Wales, hitting her three times and, alongside Prinz Eugen, sent her running off. They would be fired again when Bismarck was attacked by Fairey Swordfish torpedo bombers, where they were fired into the water to create massive splashes in order to blow away the British bombers. After Bismarck sustained a rudder jam, she was attacked by the British battleships King George V and Rodney. They would be fired but would claim no hits as they were all destroyed by 14-inch (356 mm) and 16-inch (406 mm) gunfire.

A few years later, on September 7, 1943, the German battleship Tirpitz used her 38-cm guns to bombard the island Spitzbergen. Fifty-two 38-cm shells were fired, and several shore installments were destroyed, and 74 soldiers were killed.

=== Weapons of comparable role, performance and era ===
- 380 mm/45 Modèle 1935 gun : French equivalent
- 381mm / 50 Model 1934 naval gun : Italian equivalent
- BL 15-inch Mk I naval gun
