= Kristiansand Cannon Museum =

Military museum in Norway

Coordinates: 58°05′31″N 7°58′06″E

Kristiansand Cannon Museum is a museum in Kristiansand Municipality in Agder county, Norway. The museum is located in Møvik, about 8 kilometres (5.0 mi) west of the centre of the city of Kristiansand. The museum has collected authentic equipment from a former military installation.

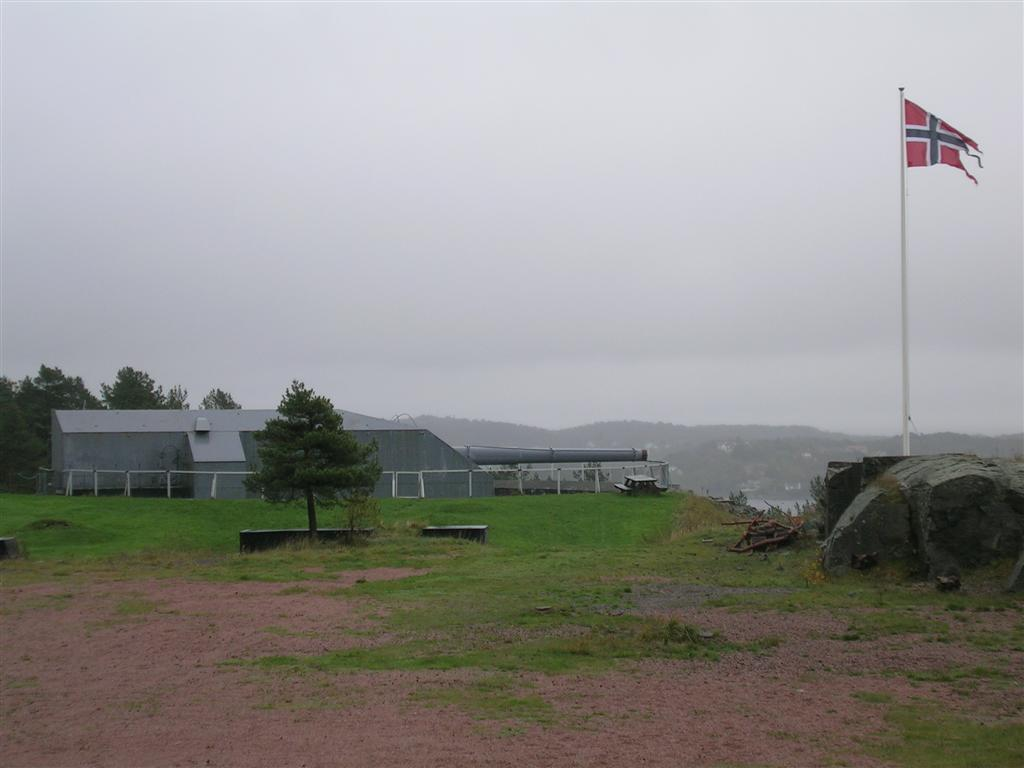
The Cannon, a 38 cm SK C/34 naval gun. on Batterie Vara

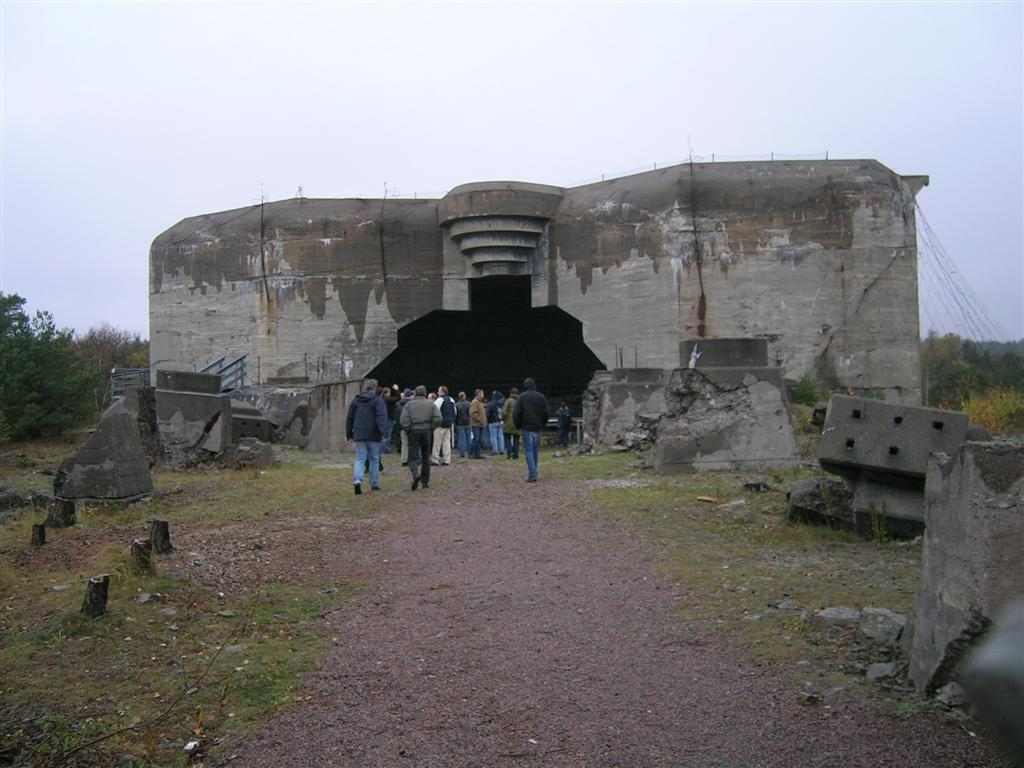
Casemate on Batterie Vara. The largest cannon that was to be here, did not arrive as the cargo ship was sunk in the Kattegat in February 1945

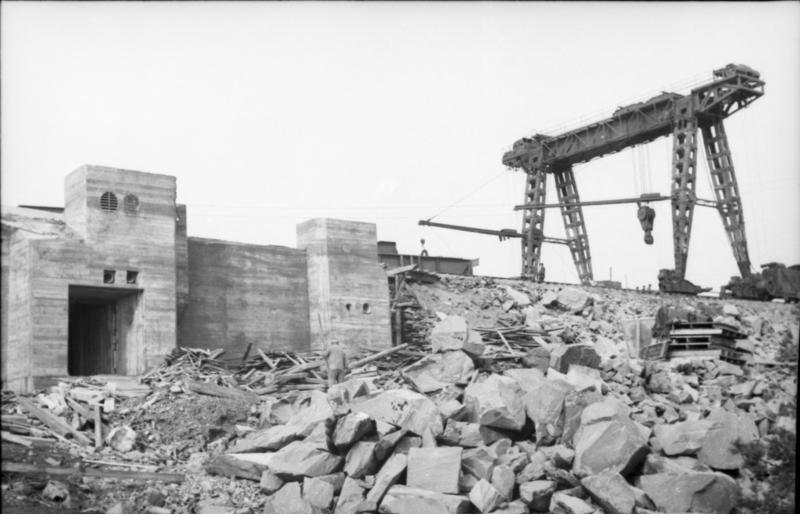
Møvik Fort during the construction by Organization Todt in 1943

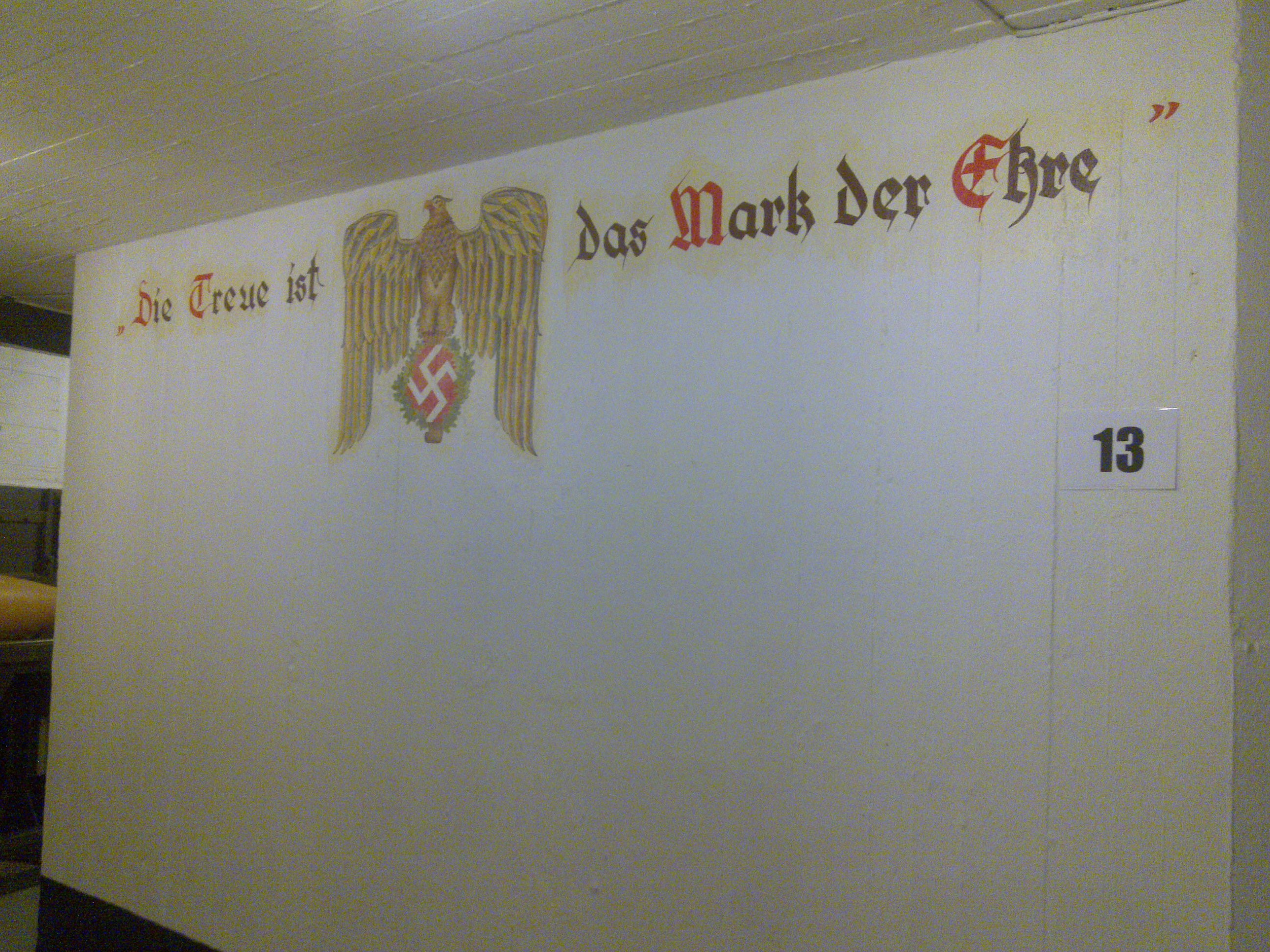
Restored wallpainting: "Fidelity is the sign of honor"

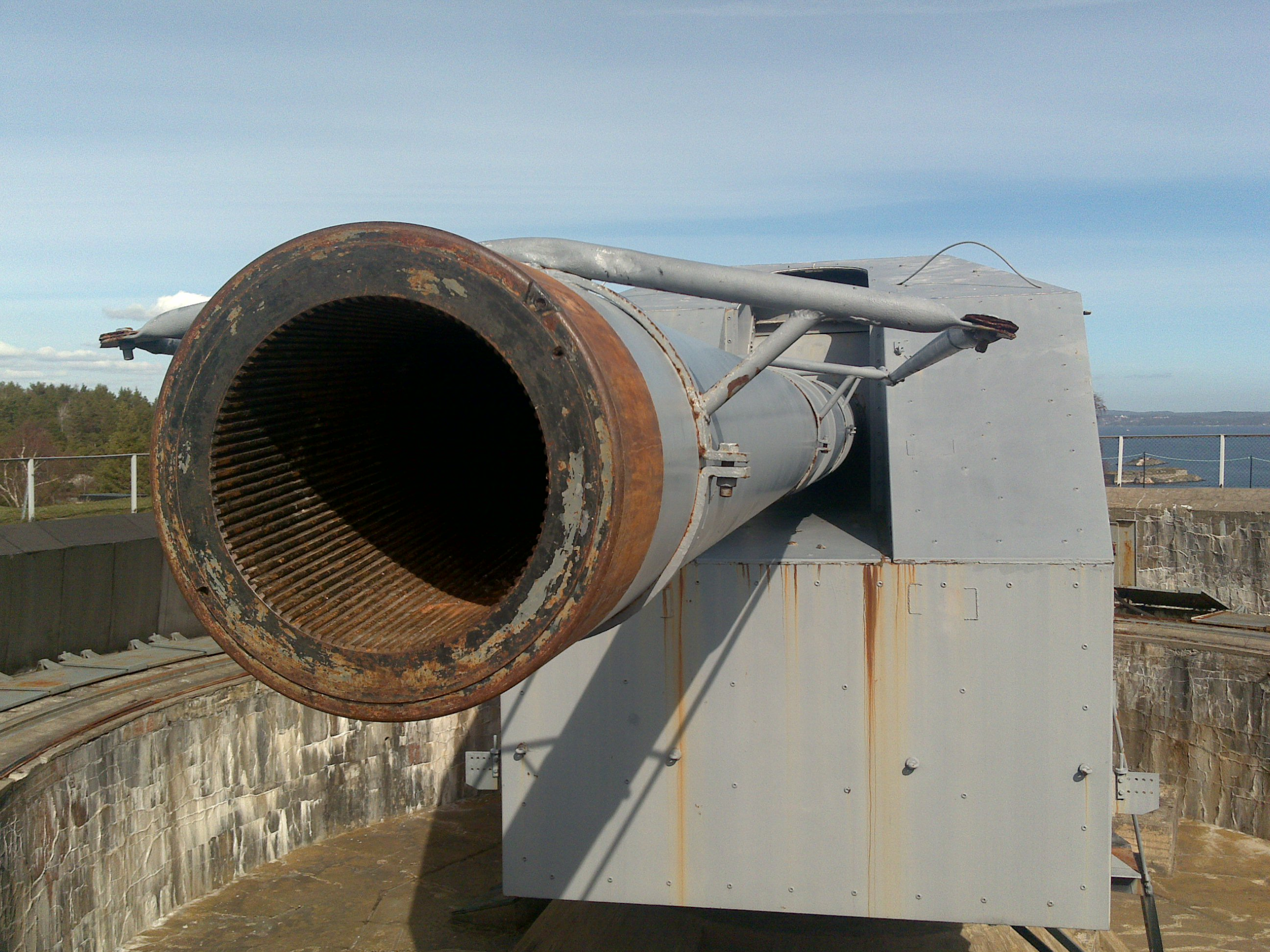
38 cm SK C/34 naval cannon

== Name ==
The coastal artillery fortress was named Batterie Vara (MAB 6./502 Vara) by the Germans, when it was built by the German Wehrmacht during World War II. It was named after Major General Felix Vara, who was killed off Alderney in the English Channel on 3 November 1941. After the war, the Norwegian Armed Forces named it Møvik Fort.

== History ==
The fort was constructed between 1941 and 1944 by the German navy. Together with four other coastal batteries, it formed a part of the Kristiansand Artillery Group. Together with its sister battery at Hanstholm in Denmark, Møvik Fort was built to obstruct Allied naval forces by blocking the Skagerrak strait and the seaways to Eastern Norway, the Kattegatt Bay, the Baltic Sea and the Baltic region for the allied naval forces. Only a field, ten nautical miles wide, in the Skagerrak could not be covered by the guns of these facilities. This field was therefore mined.

Adolf Hitler worked personally for the barrier strategy and the decision about the fortress in Hanstholm was made in May 1940. In May 1941, two of the guns in Hanstholm were in place and on the Norwegian side preparatory work started.

For a few years after the war, Møvik fort was an operating Norwegian fortress. In 1953 it became part of Kristiansand fortress. On 20 April 1959 the fort was closed and two of the guns and the foundations of the fourth were scrapped.

== The museum ==
Plans for a museum began in 1984. After extensive renovation work in the late 1980s and early 1990s by local armed forces and the Foundation Kristiansand Cannon Museum Møvik, a foundation was laid in 1991, and a part of the fort was opened to the public in 1993. Efforts to restore the 600-millimetre (24 in) narrow gauge funicular railway who once transported the heavy shells are well underway.

The fortress had four gun positions, of which one of the guns is still intact. There are empty gun emplacements and an empty casemate. The 38 cm calibre gun is one of the largest in the world; the barrel alone weighs 110 tonnes (110 long tons; 120 short tons), measures almost 20 metres (66 ft) in length and has a range of up to 55 kilometres (34 mi). In the museum, this historic site can be experienced, by following the Fortress Trail - a walk to places and buildings which tell of everyday life in a fortress and national, military events.

The Kristiansand Cannon Museum is run today by the Foundation Kristiansand Cannon Museum Møvik (Stiftelsen Kristiansand Kannonmuseum Møvik) and administered by the Nasjonale Festningsverk (National Fortresses). The gun at the fort is one of the largest remaining land-based guns in the World.

== See also ==
- Todt Battery
